= Golden Globe Award for Best Motion Picture – Non-English Language =

Award

Golden Globe for Best Motion Picture – Non-English Language
- Awarded for: Best Motion Picture in a Foreign Language
- Location: United States
- Presented by: Dick Clark Productions
- Currently held by: The Secret Agent (2025)
- Website: goldenglobes.com

The Golden Globe Award for Best Motion Picture – Non-English Language is a Golden Globe Award presented by Dick Clark Productions to reward theatrically-released feature film not in the English language.

It was first introduced at the 7th Golden Globe Awards for the 1949 film year as Best Foreign-Language Foreign Film, and would return to be awarded yearly from the 1957 film year onwards; from 1948 to 1972, it existed alongside the Best English-Language Foreign Film category, which was intended for English-language films made outside the United States. The two categories were fused into Best Foreign Film in 1973, now rewarding any non-American films regardless of language; this was reversed in 1986 when it was renamed to Best Foreign Language Film, although this last change also made American films in non-English language eligible, such as winners Letters from Iwo Jima and Minari. In 2022, the category was renamed Best Motion Picture – Non-English Language.

The award was originally an equivalent to the pre-existent Best English-Language Foreign Film, for English-language film made outside the United States.

Since the 1987 change in the criteria for this award, its eligibility criteria have been considerably broader than those for the Academy Award for Best International Feature Film; films are notably not submitted by their country, and there is no limit of one-eligible film per country as in the Academy Awards. Before 1974, the award was given only infrequently, and with several films being jointly honoured per year.

The most honored country in this category is the United Kingdom, with seven films honored, followed by Spain and France.

== Eligibility criteria ==
Like the Academy Award for Best International Feature Film, this award does not require that an eligible film be released in the United States. The official rules for the award state that submitted films must be at least 70 minutes in length and have at least 51% of their dialogue in a language other than English, and that they be "first released in their country of origin during the 14-months period from November 1 to December 31, prior to the Awards". Films that were not released in their country of origin due to censorship qualify with a one-week release in the U.S. during the specified period.

Dick Clark Productions (through its Golden Globes, LLC subsidiary), which took over the presentation of the Golden Globes from the Hollywood Foreign Press Association (HFPA) in 2024, continues the HFPA's practice of not limiting the number of submitted films from a given country. This differs from the practice of the Academy Awards' presenter, the Academy of Motion Picture Arts and Sciences (AMPAS), which limits each country to one submission per year.

== Winners and nominations ==
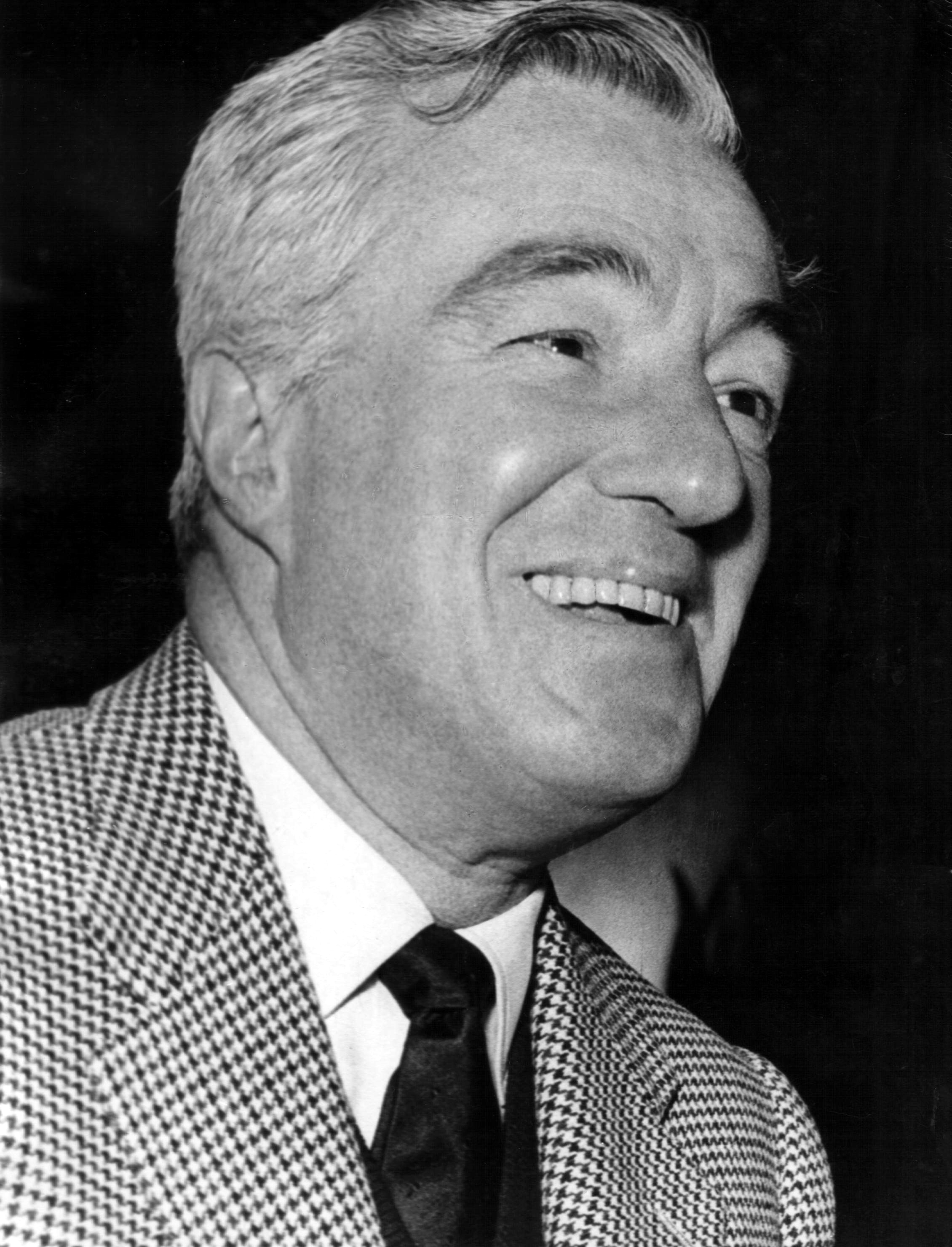
Vittorio De Sica won thrice for Bicycle Thieves (1949), Two Women (1961), and Marriage Italian Style (1964).

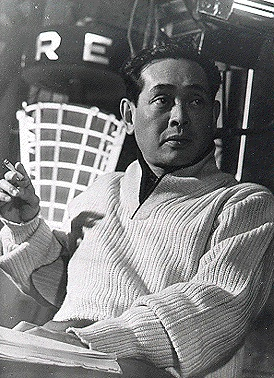
Keisuke Kinoshita won for Twenty-Four Eyes (1954).

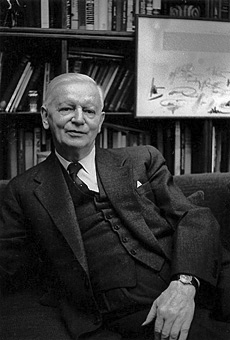
Carl Theodor Dreyer won for Ordet (1955).

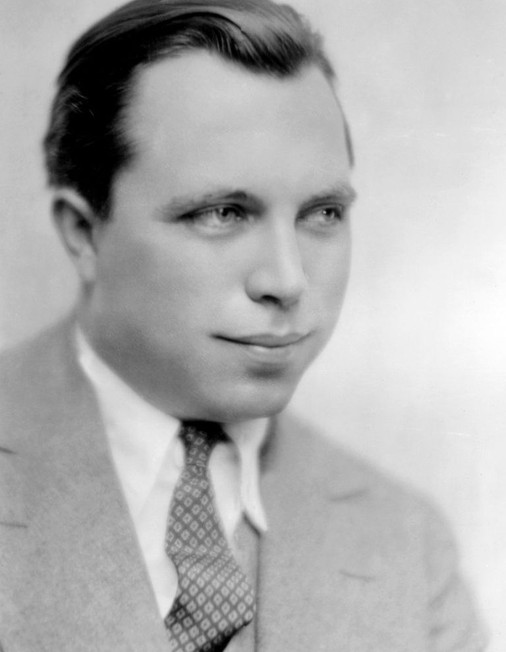
King Vidor won for War and Peace (1956).

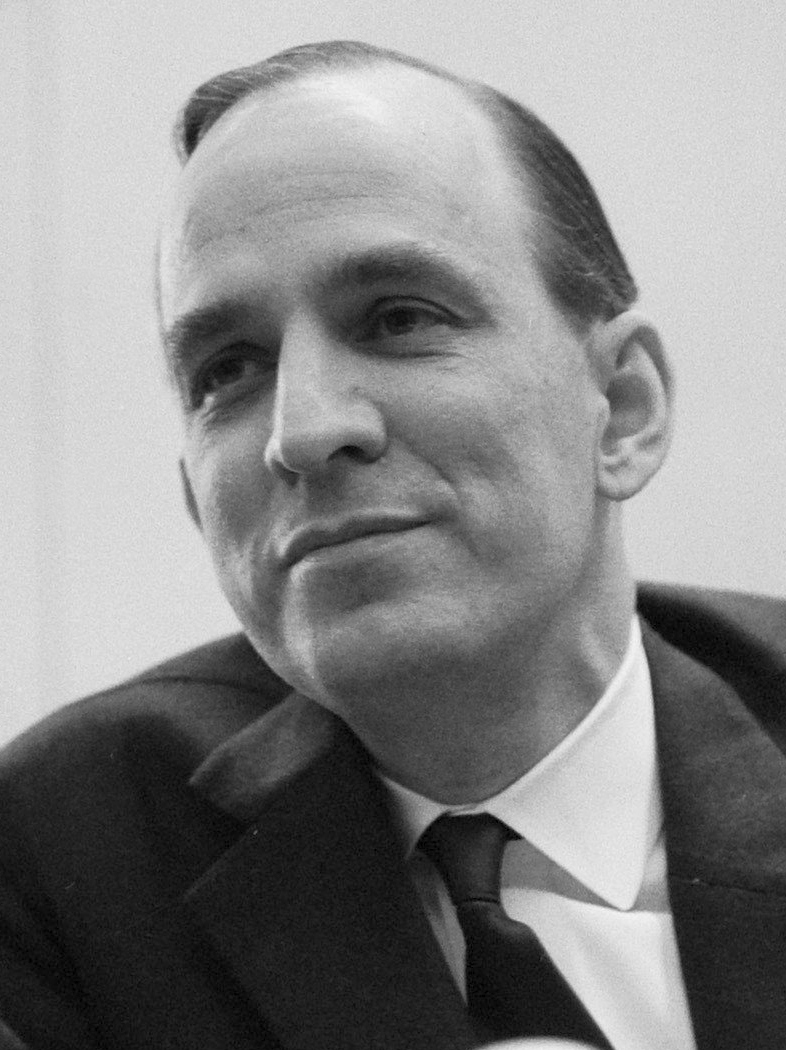
Ingmar Bergman has won the most times in this category, a total of six for Wild Strawberries (1959), The Virgin Spring (1960), Scenes from a Marriage (1975), Face to Face (1976), Autumn Sonata (1978), and Fanny and Alexander (1983).

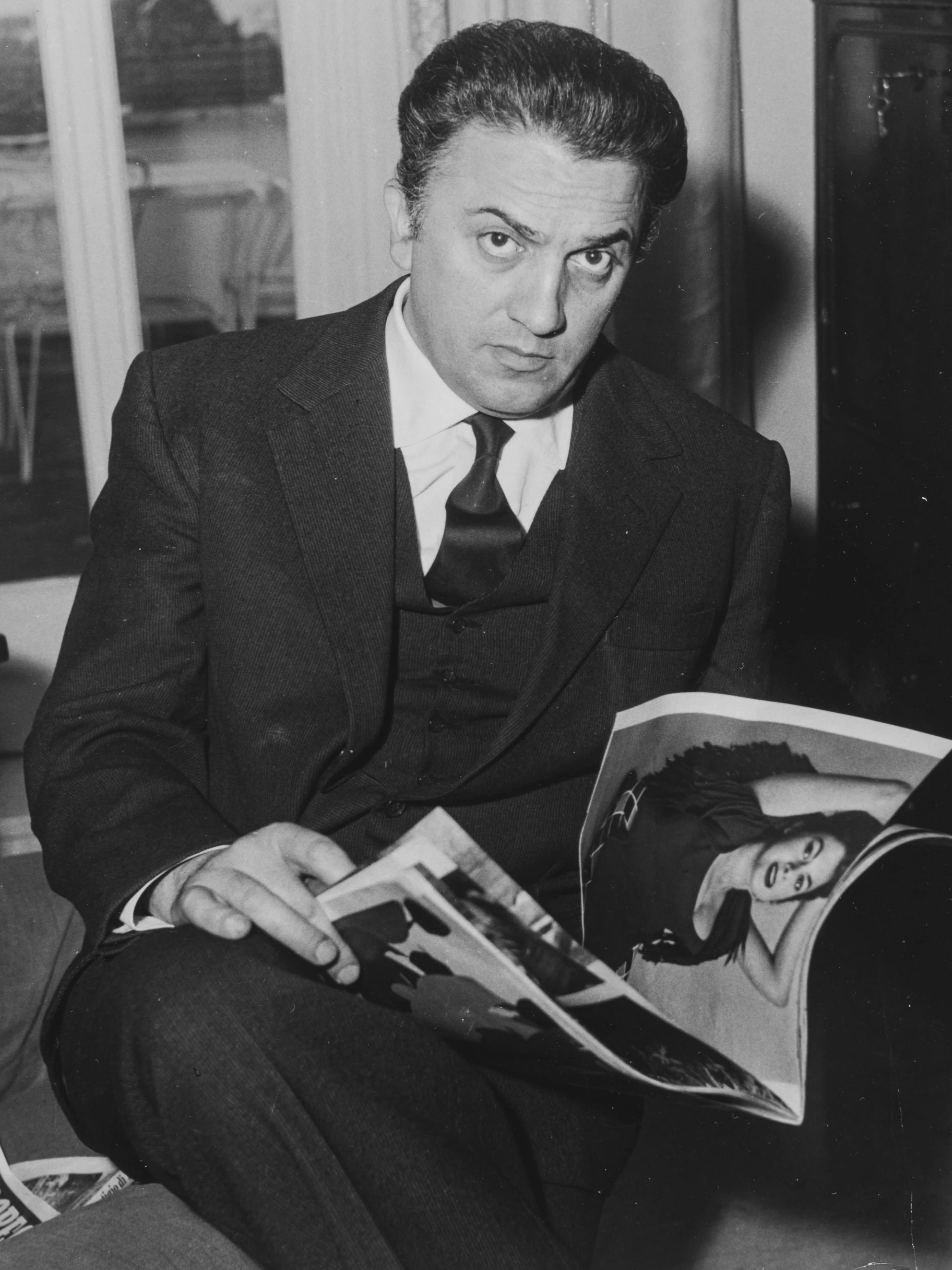
Federico Fellini won for Juliet of the Spirits (1965).

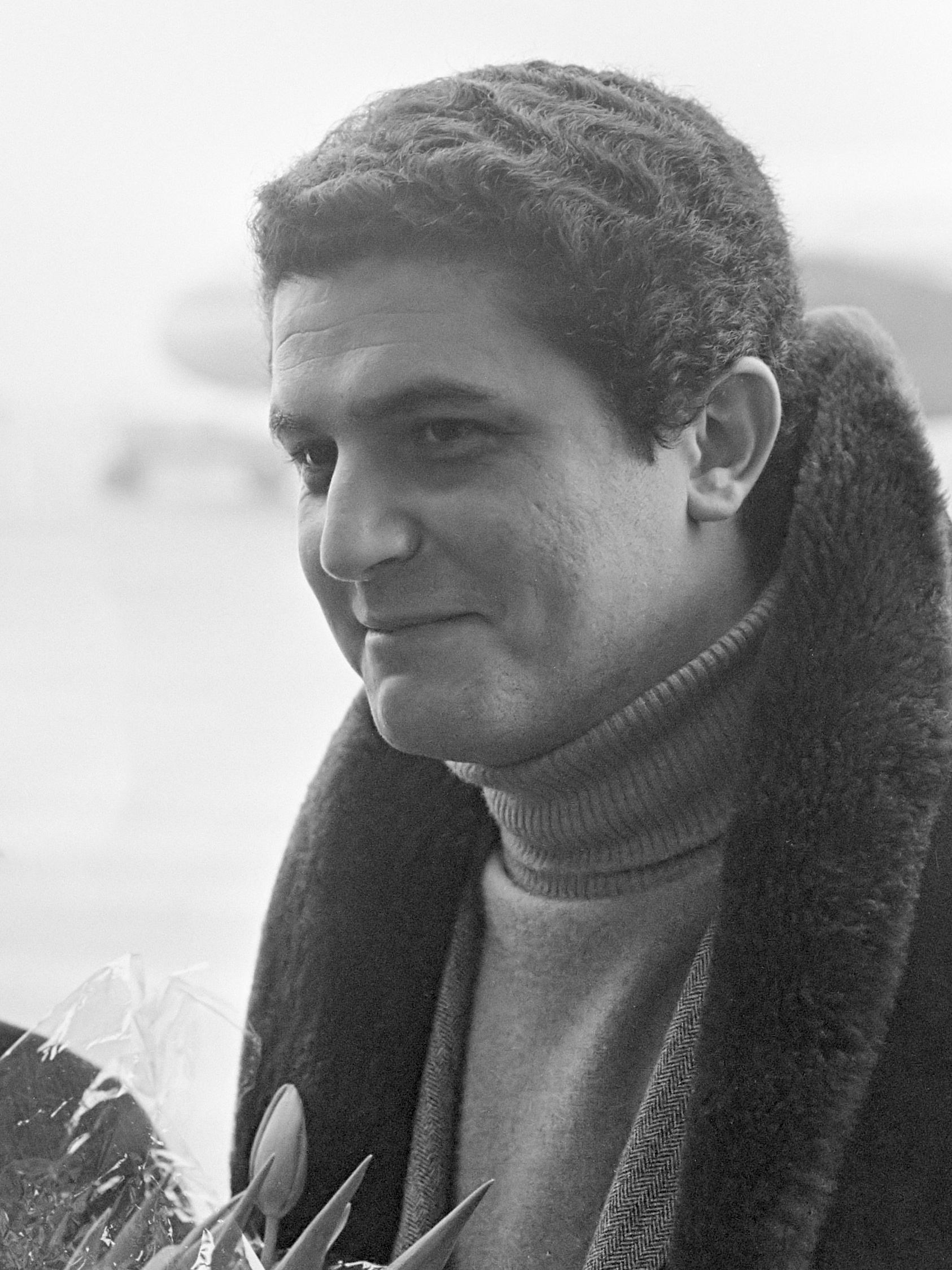
Claude Lelouch won thrice for A Man and a Woman (1966), Live for Life (1967), and Les Misérables (1995).

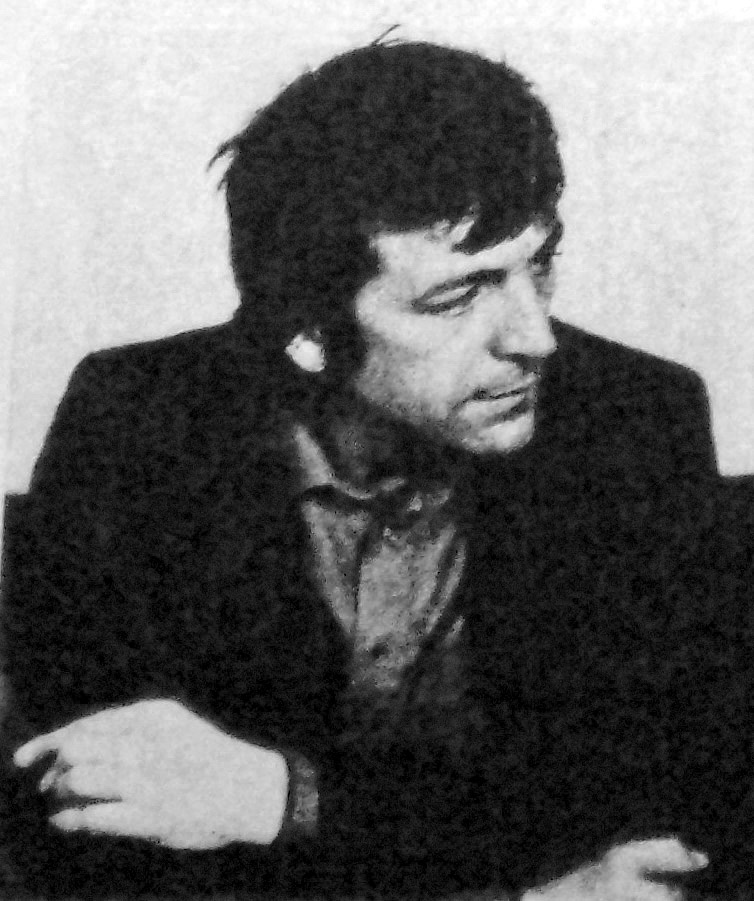
Costa-Gavras won for Z (1969).

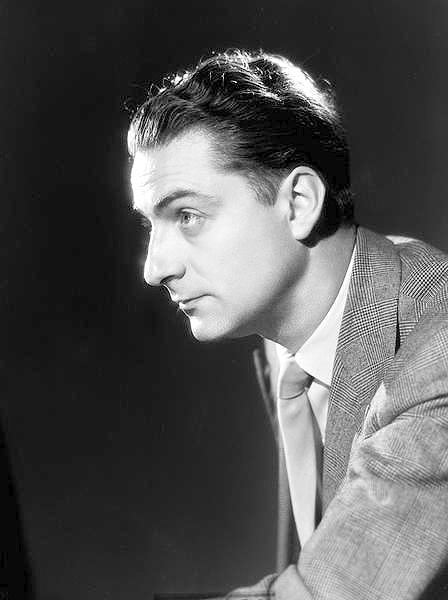
René Clément won for Rider on the Rain (1970).

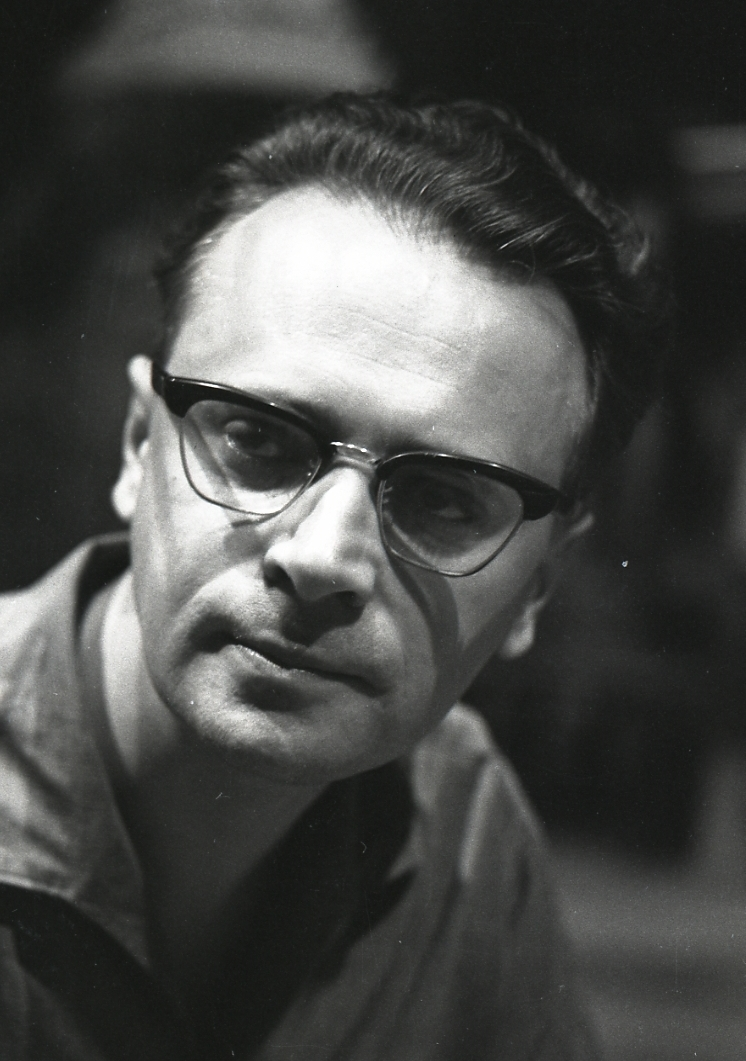
Ephraim Kishon won for The Policeman (1971).

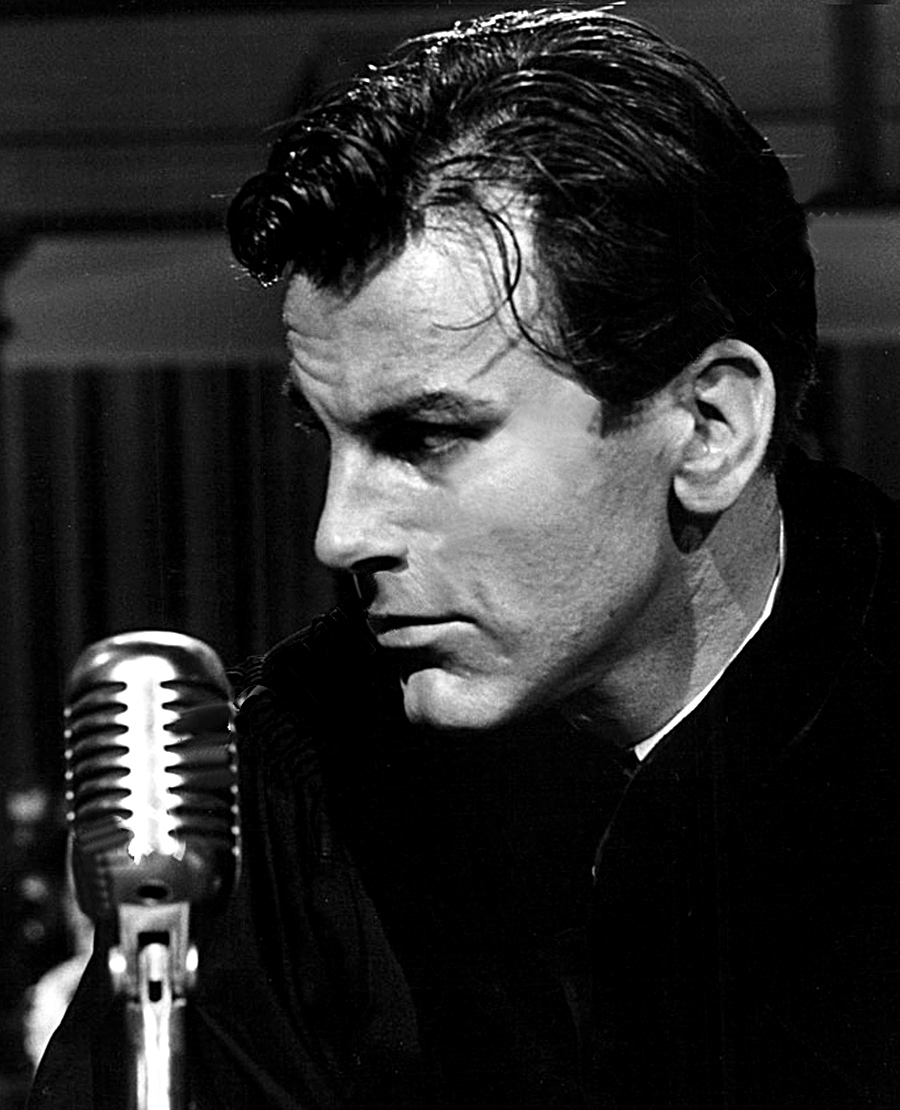
Maximilian Schell won for The Pedestrian (1973).

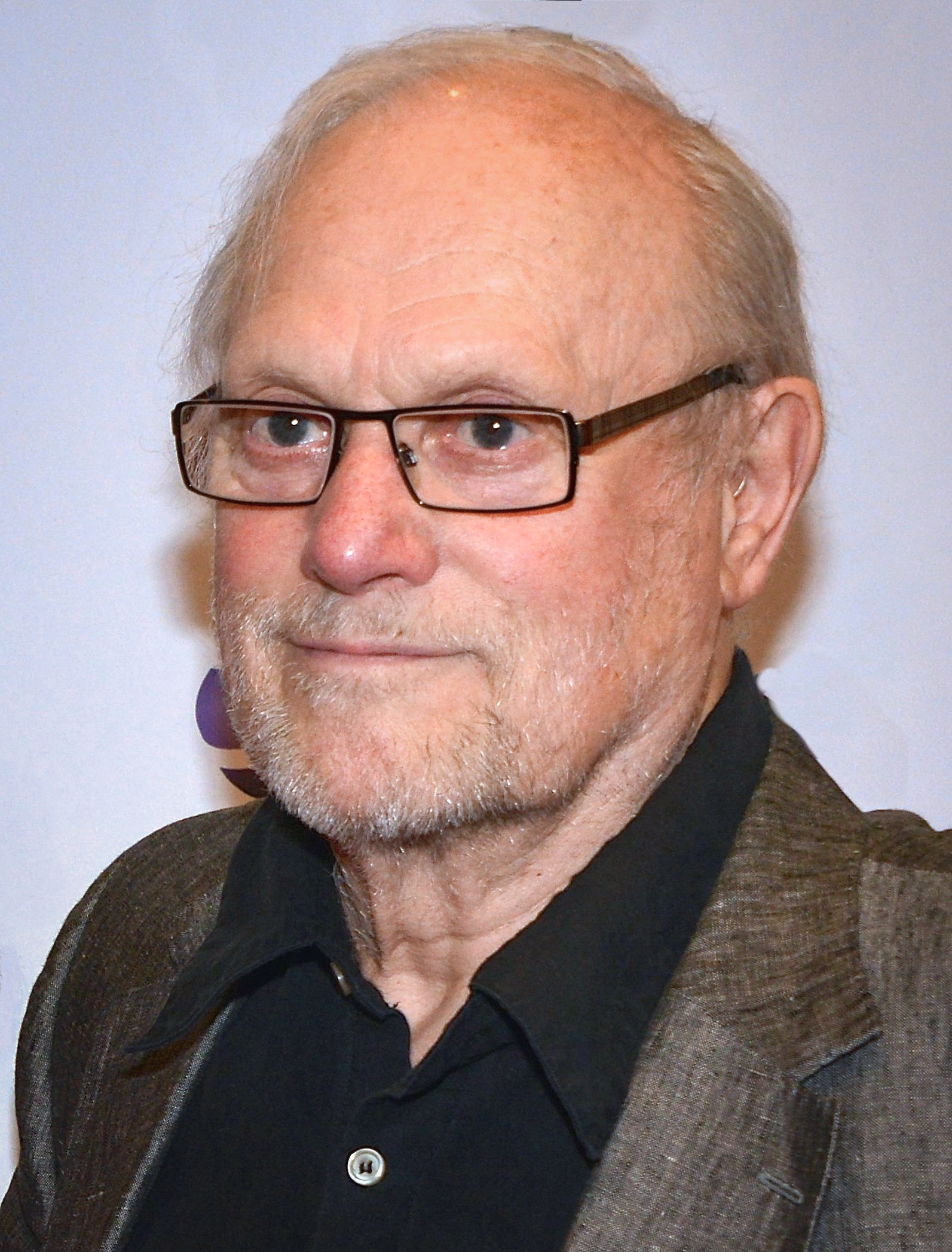
Jan Troell won twice for The Emigrants and The New Land (both 1972).

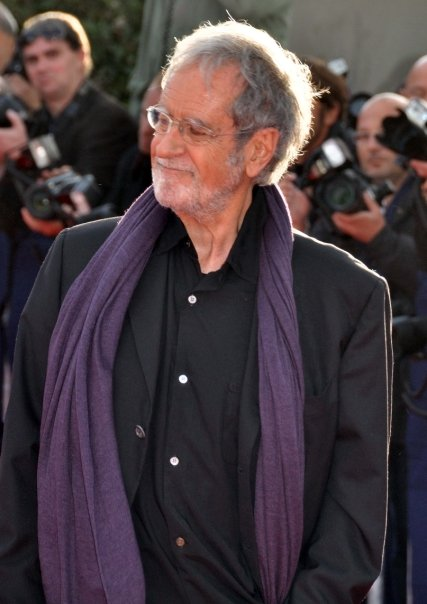
Édouard Molinaro won for La Cage aux Folles (1979).

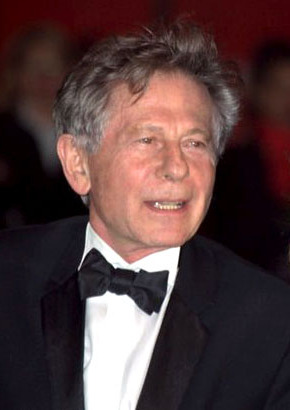
Roman Polanski won for Tess (1980)

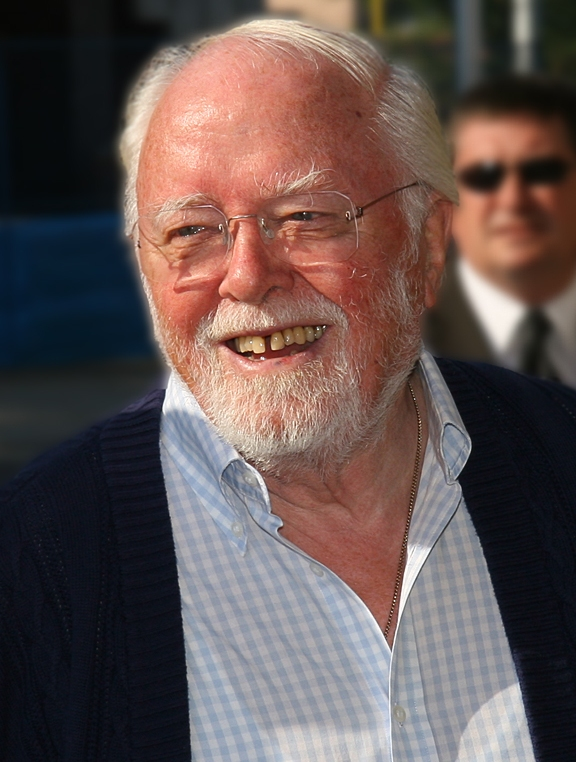
Richard Attenborough won for Gandhi (1982).

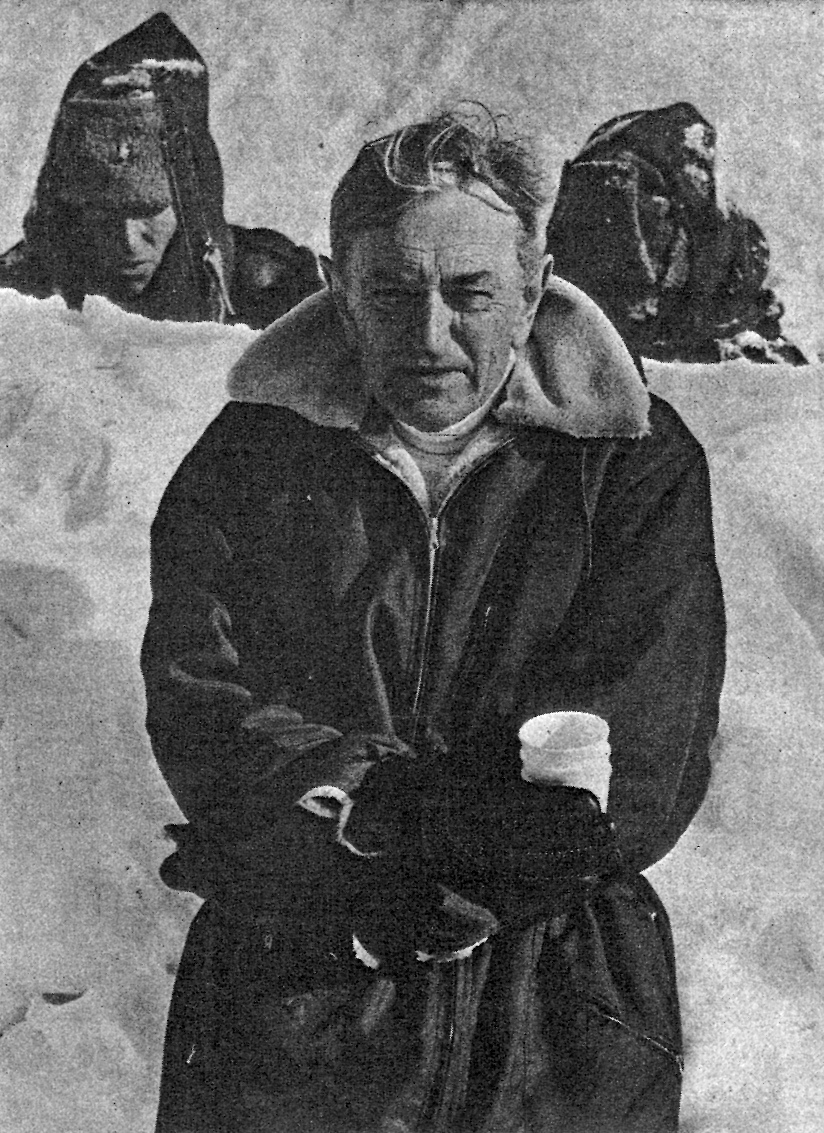
David Lean won for A Passage to India (1984).

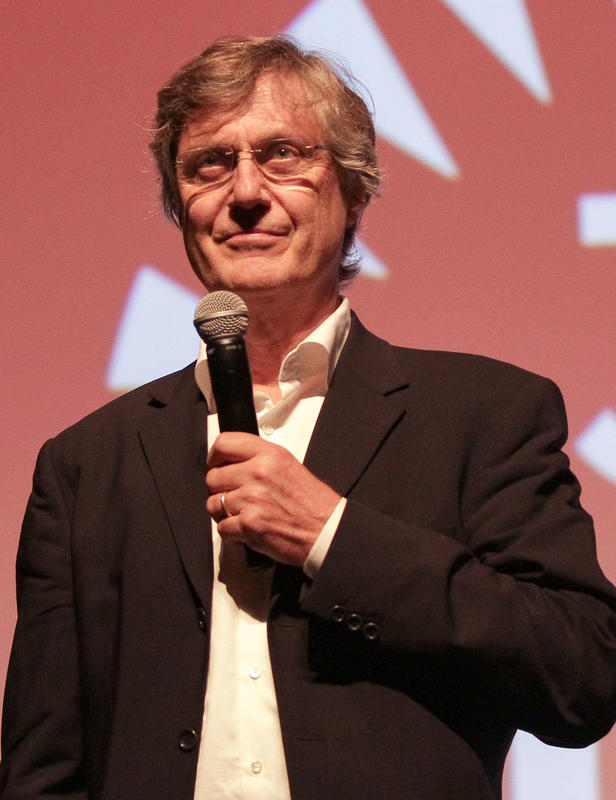
Lasse Hallström won for My Life as a Dog (1987).

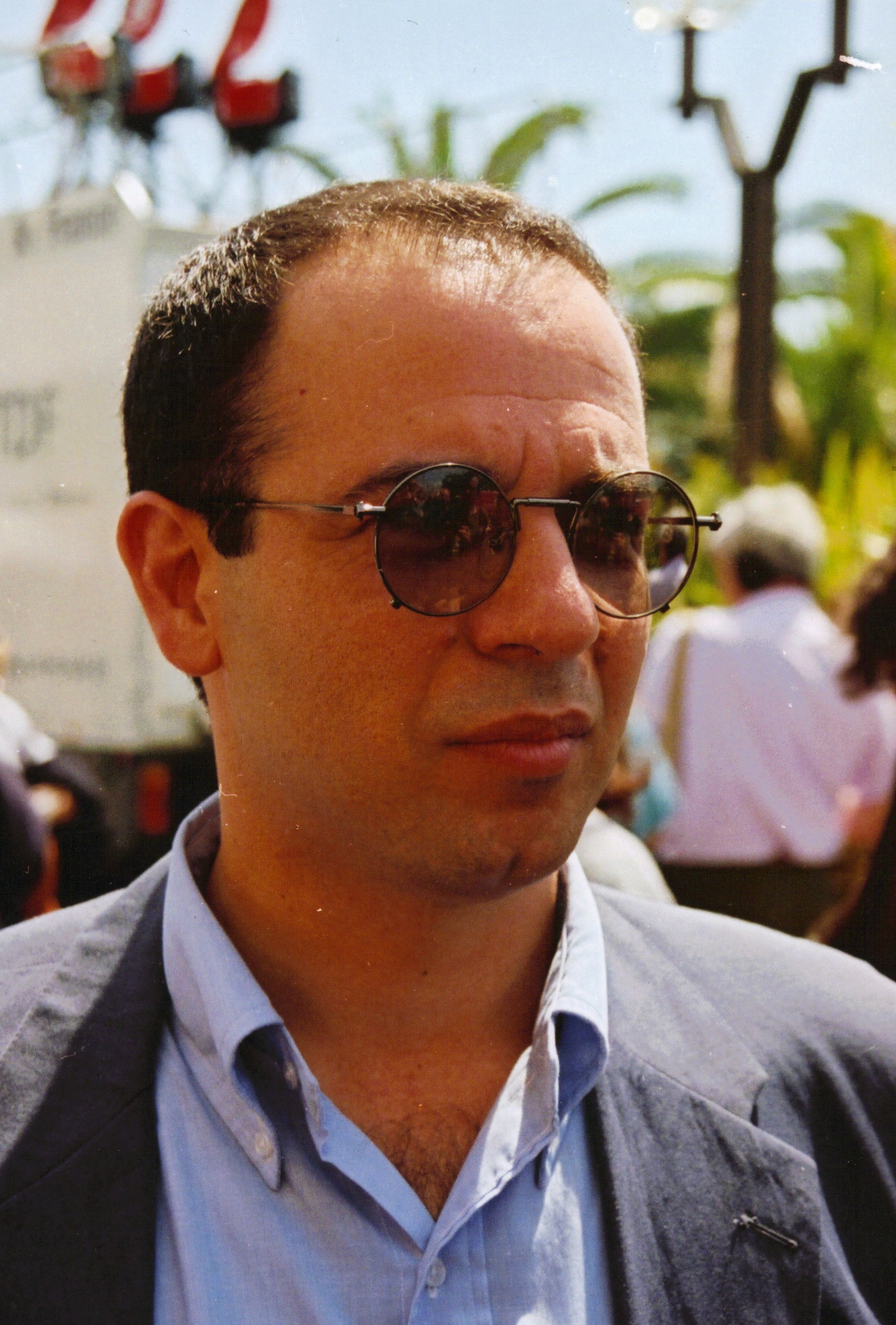
Giuseppe Tornatore won for Cinema Paradiso (1989).

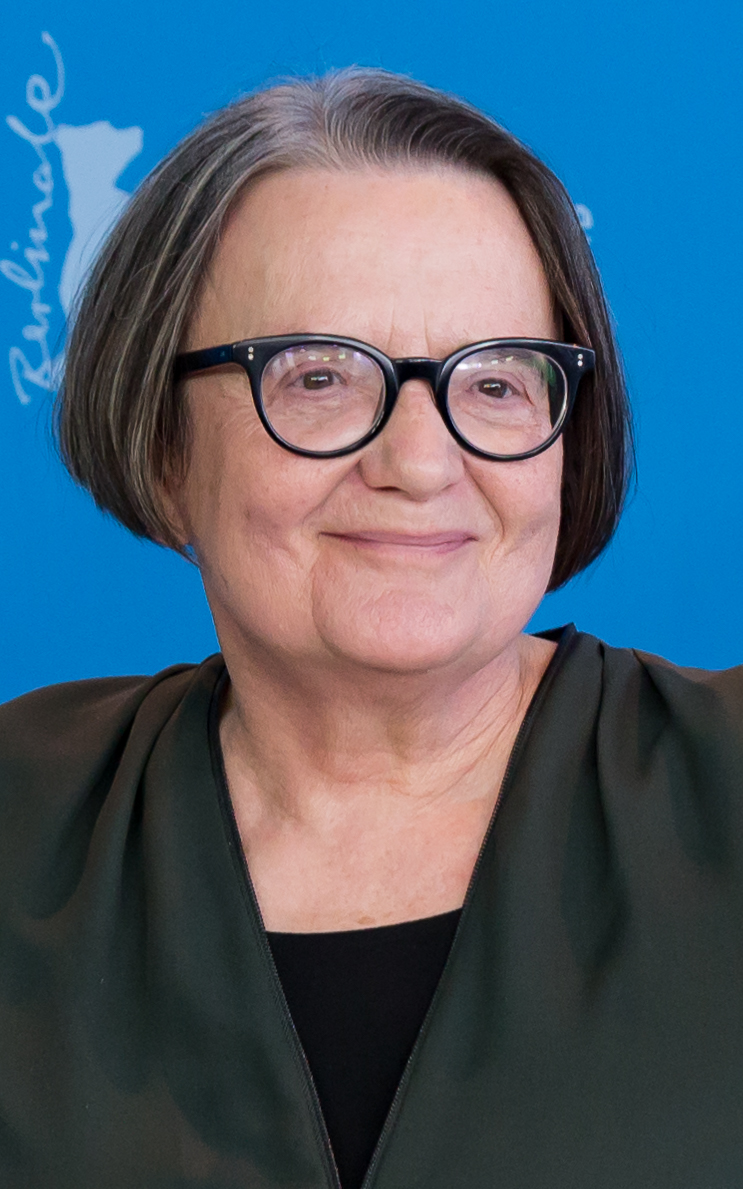
Agnieszka Holland won Europa Europa (1990).

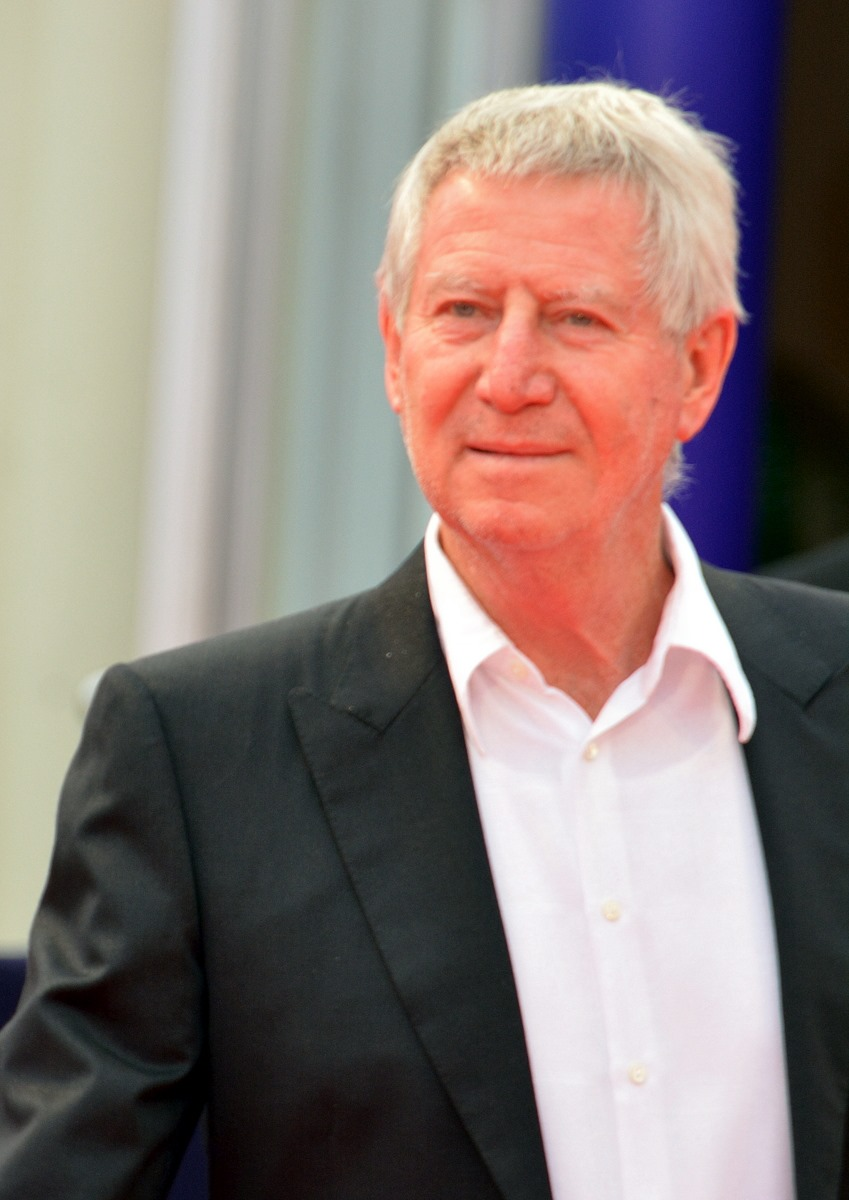
Régis Wargnier won for Indochine (1992).

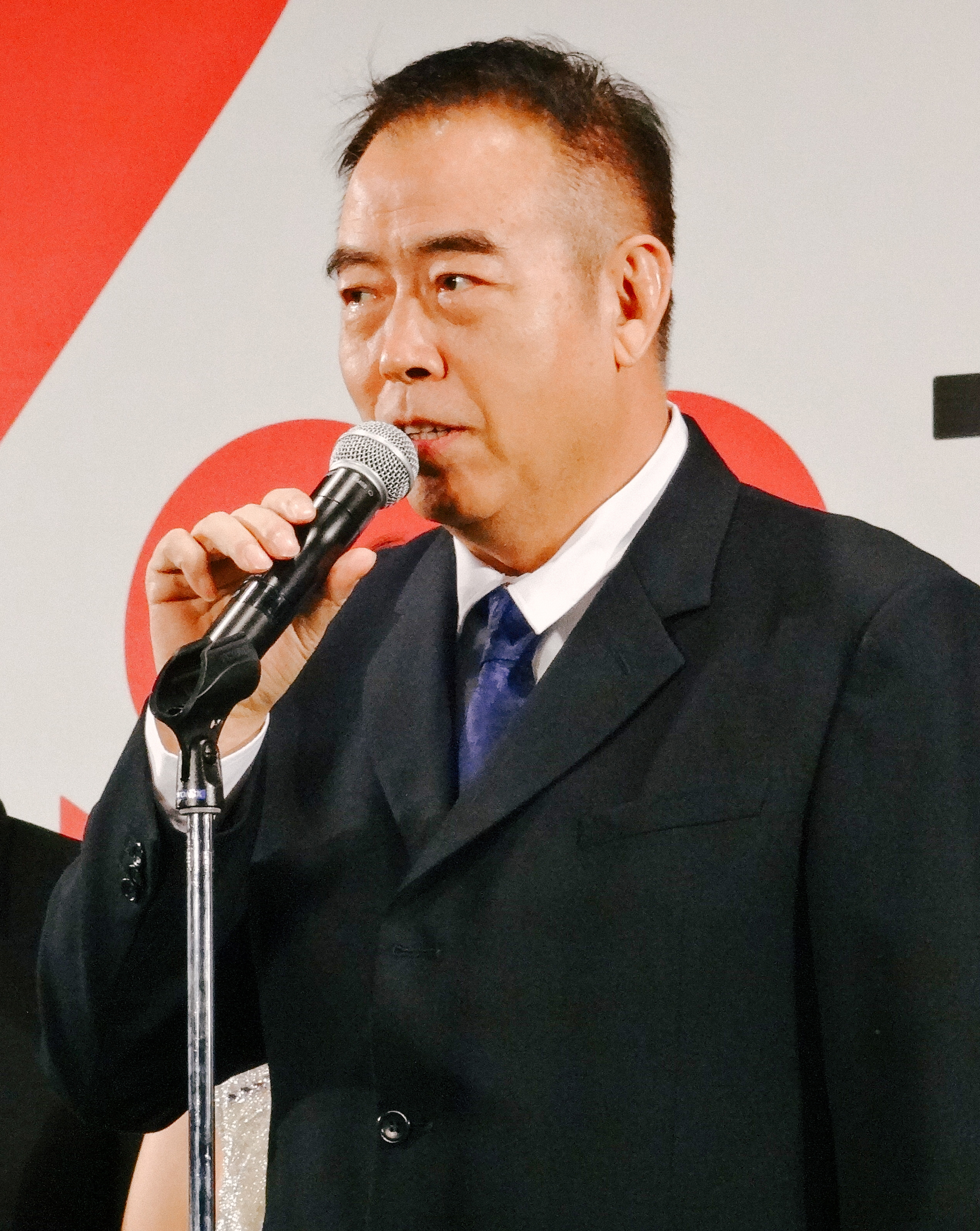
Chen Kaige won for Farewell My Concubine (1993).

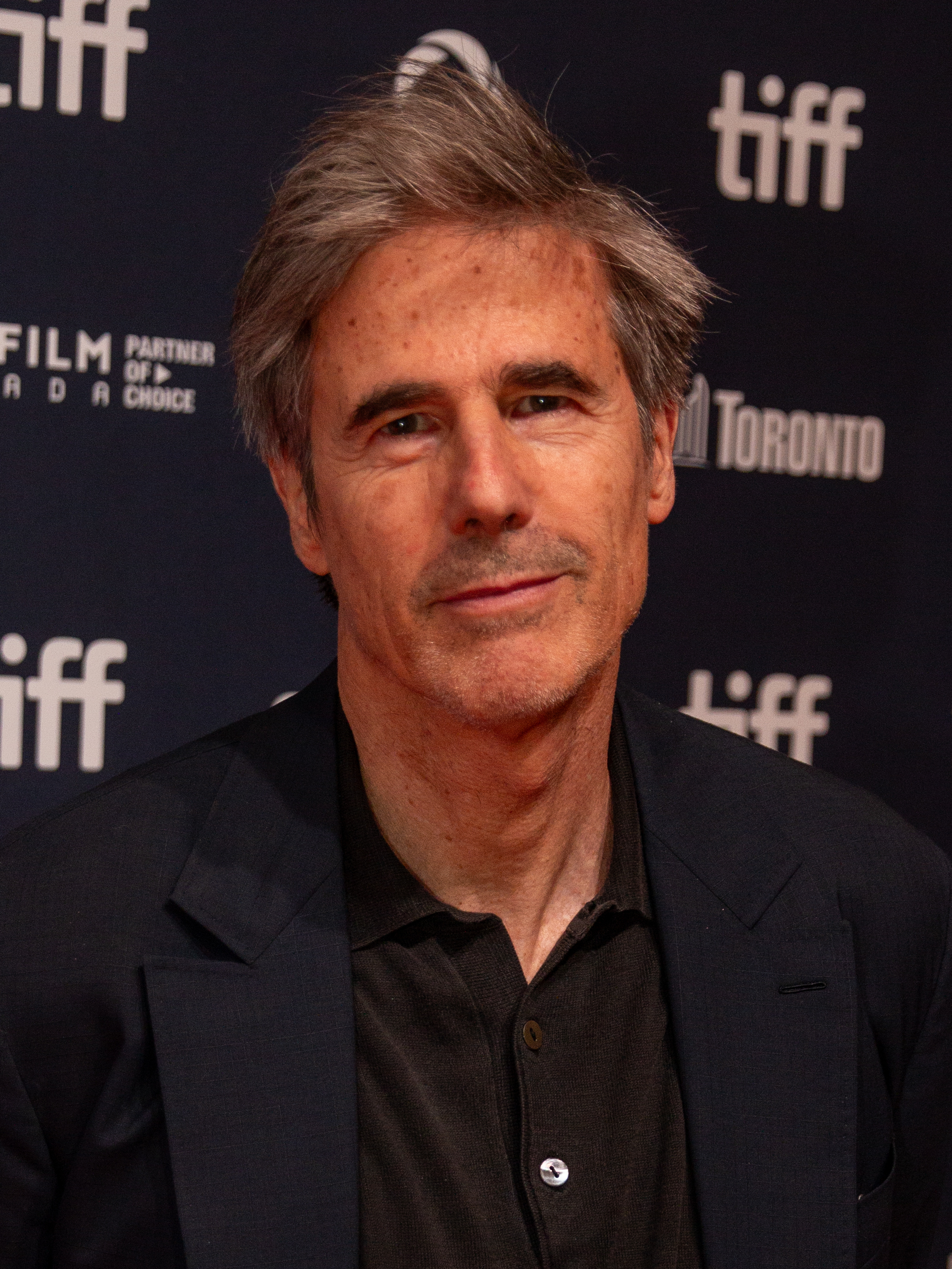
Walter Salles won for Central Station (1998).

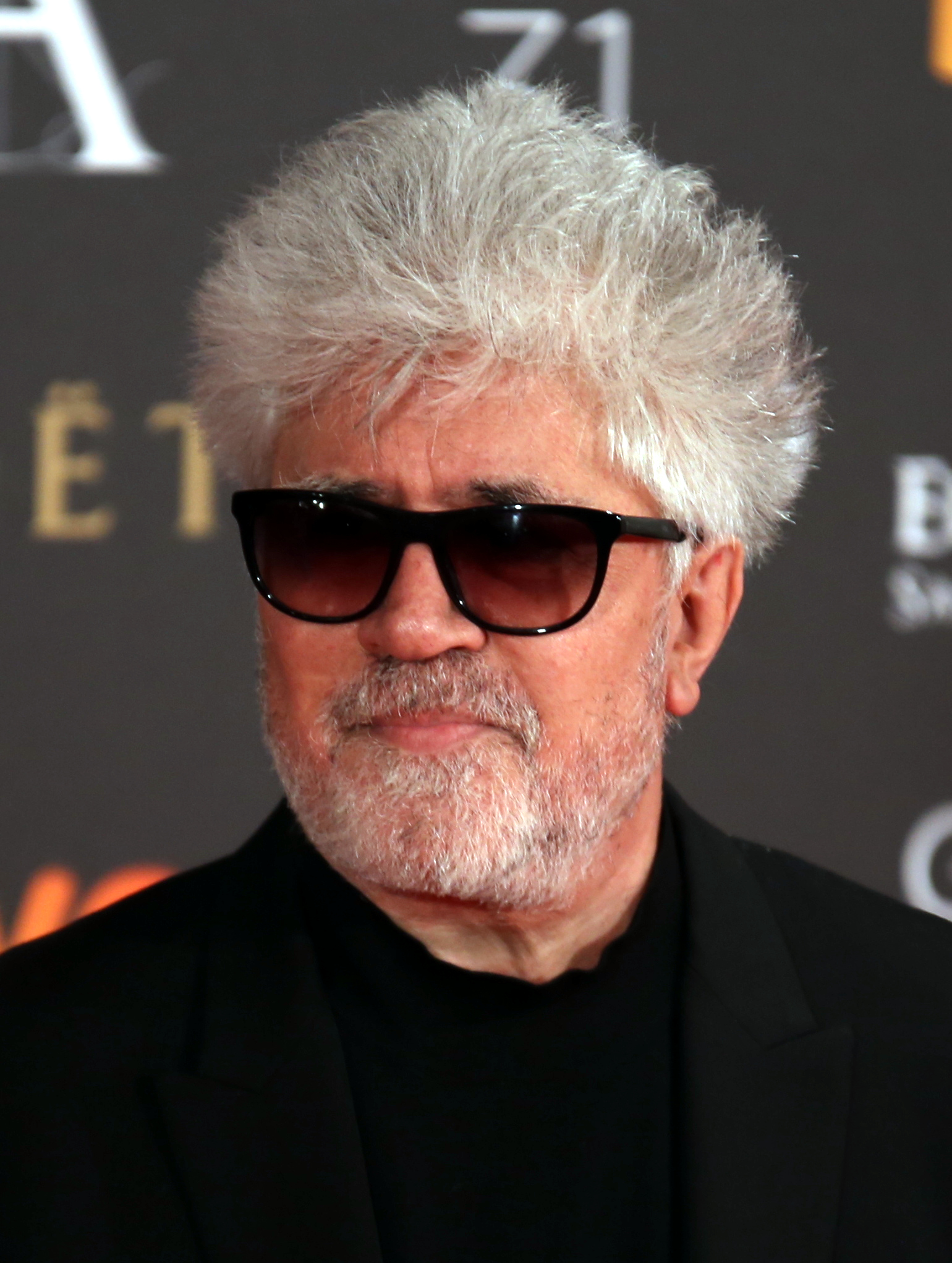
Pedro Almodóvar won twice for All About My Mother (1999) and Talk to Her (2002).

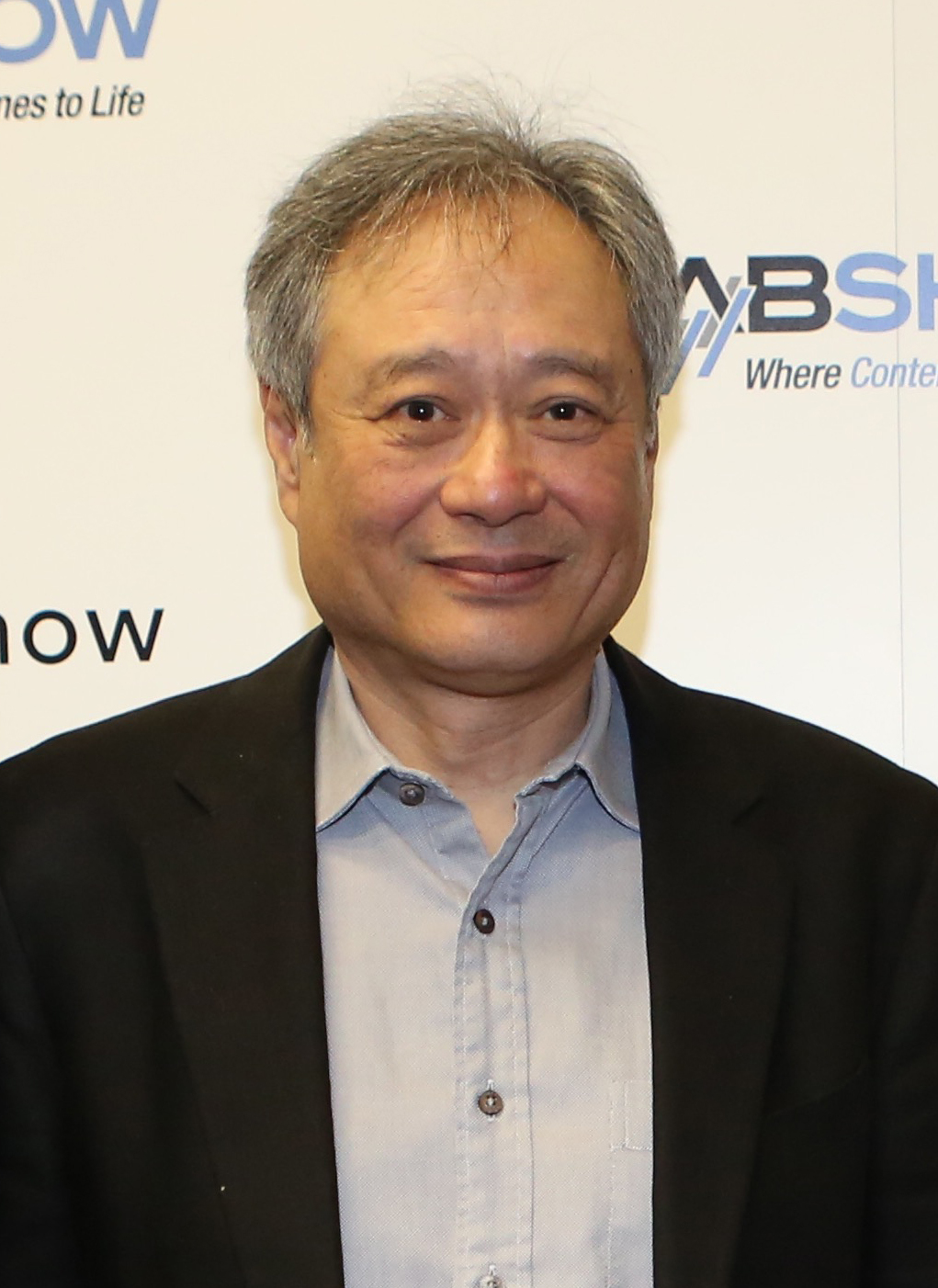
Ang Lee won for Crouching Tiger, Hidden Dragon (2000).

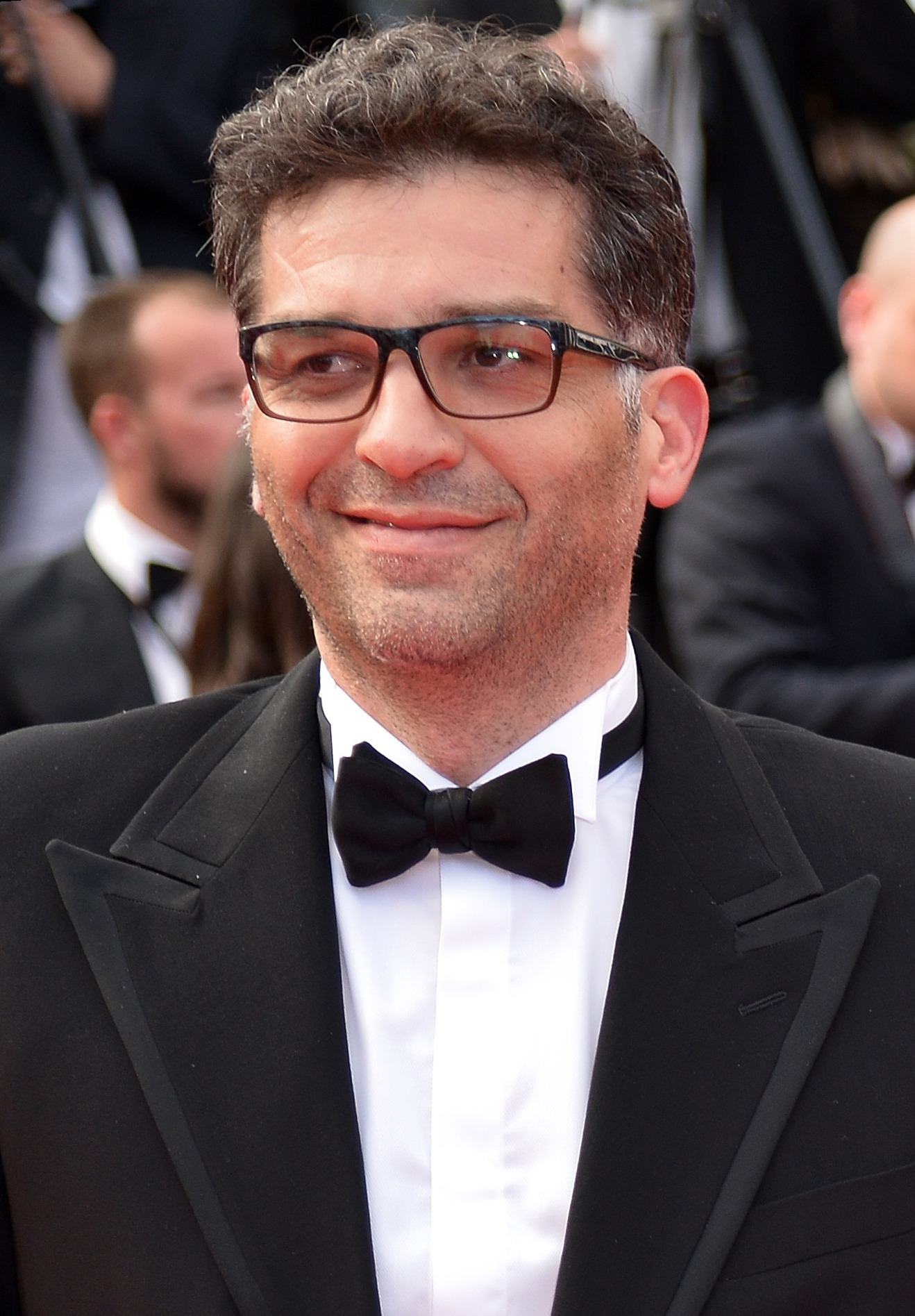
Danis Tanović won for No Man's Land (2001).

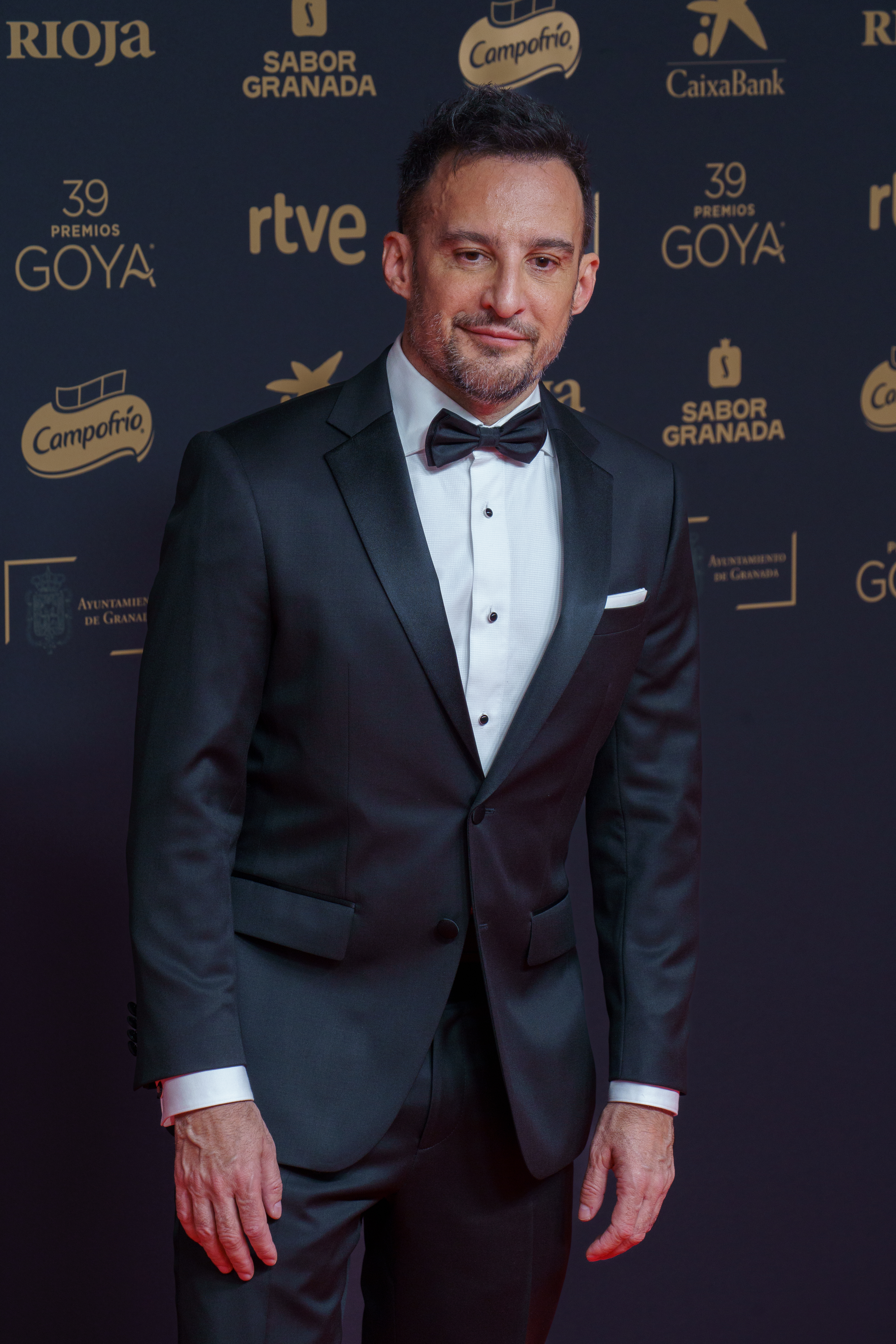
Alejandro Amenábar won for The Sea Inside (2004).

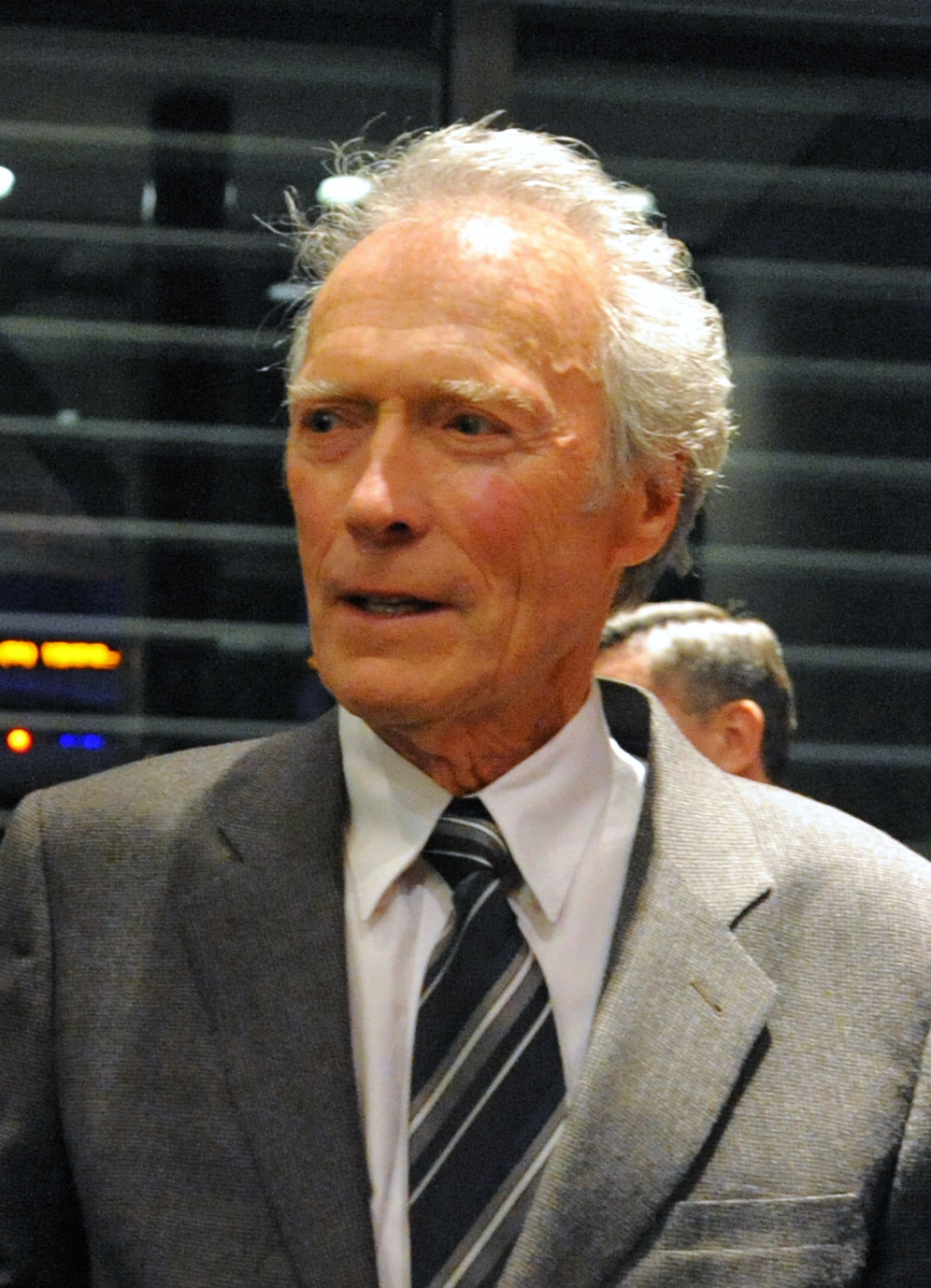
Clint Eastwood won for Letters from Iwo Jima (2006).

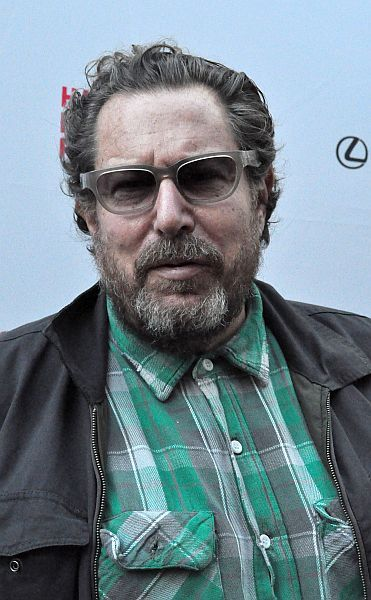
Julian Schnabel won for The Diving Bell and the Butterfly (2007).

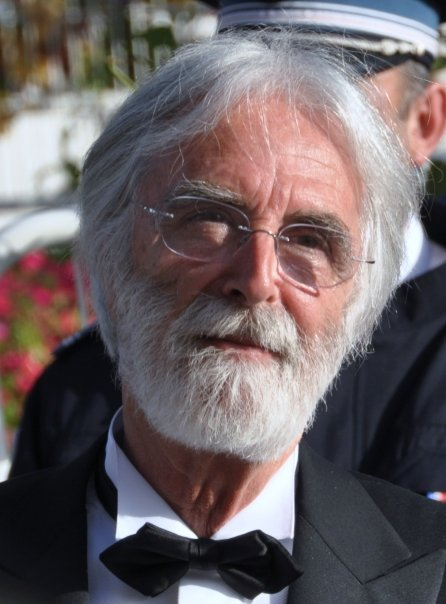
Michael Haneke won twice for The White Ribbon (2009) and Amour (2012).

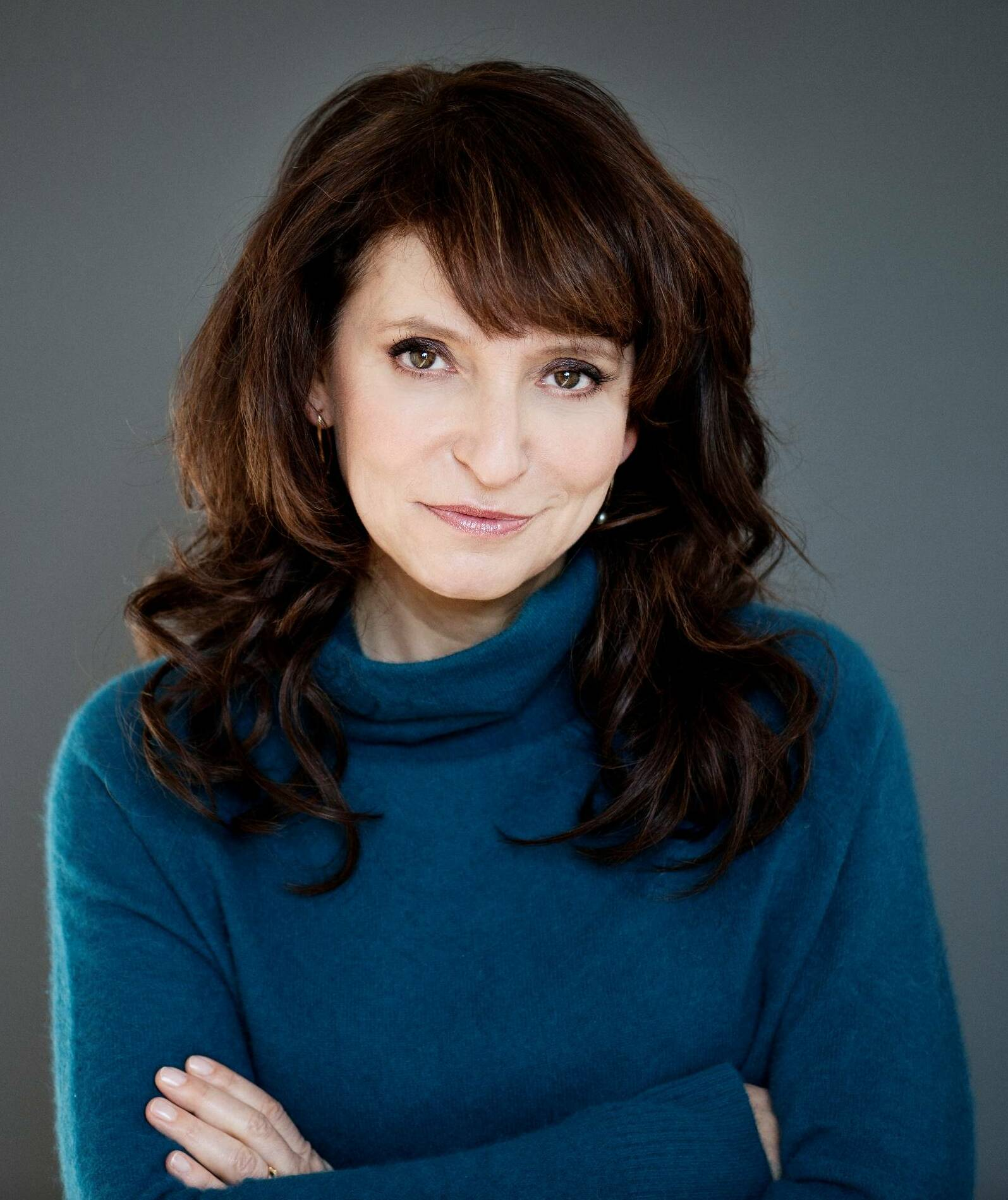
Susanne Bier won for In a Better World (2010).

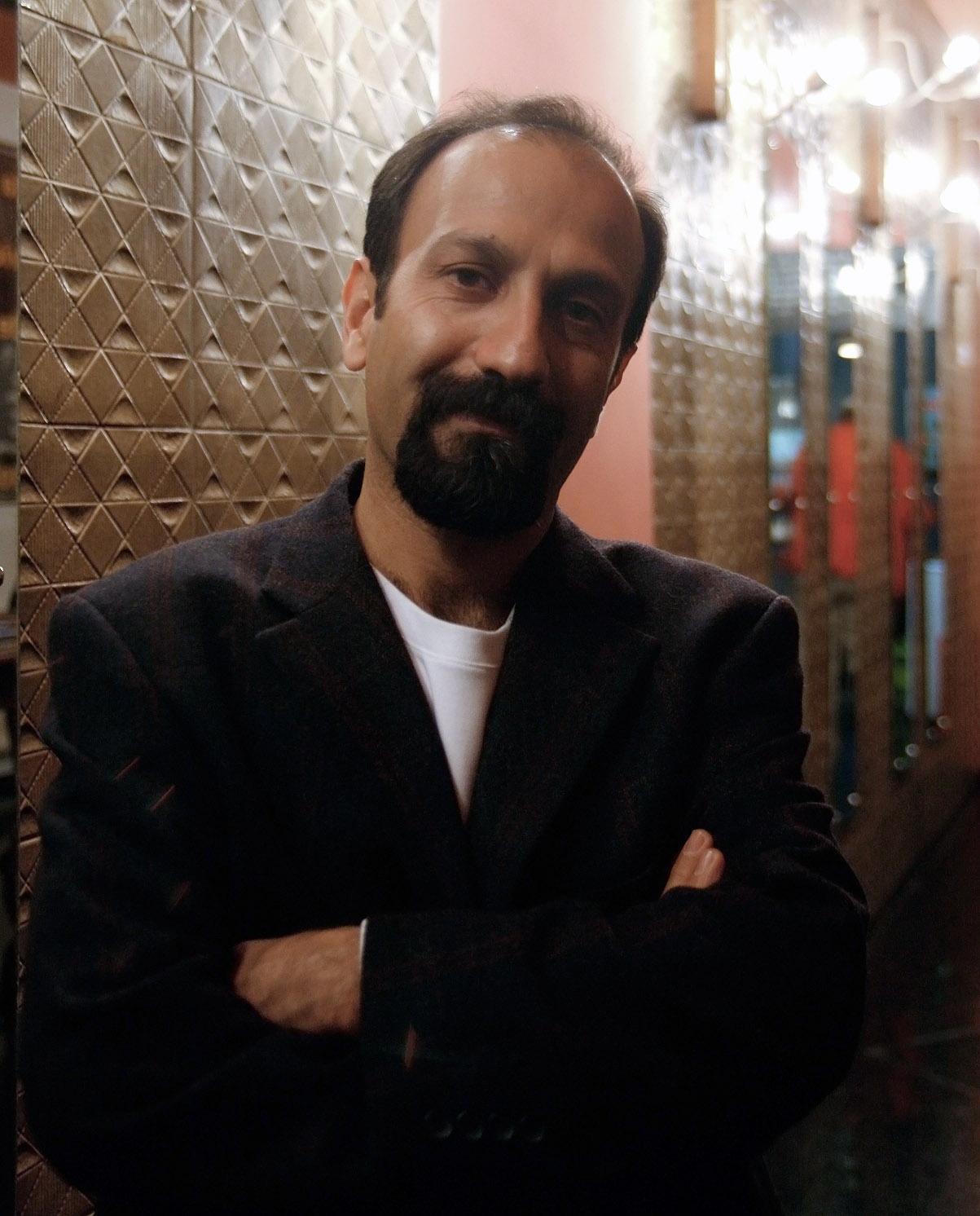
Asghar Farhadi won for A Separation (2011).

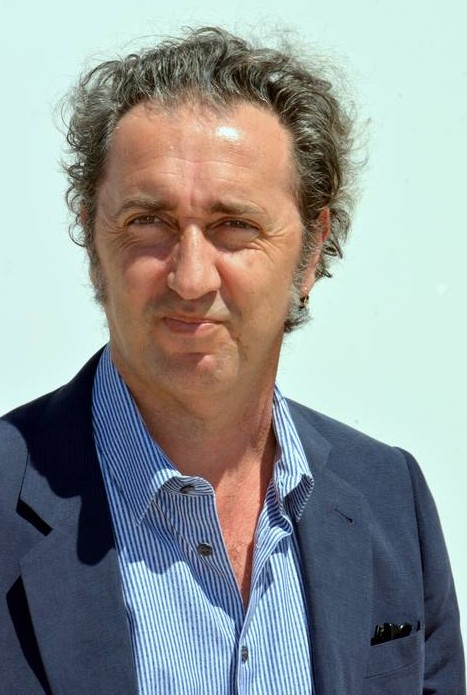
Paolo Sorrentino won for The Great Beauty (2013).

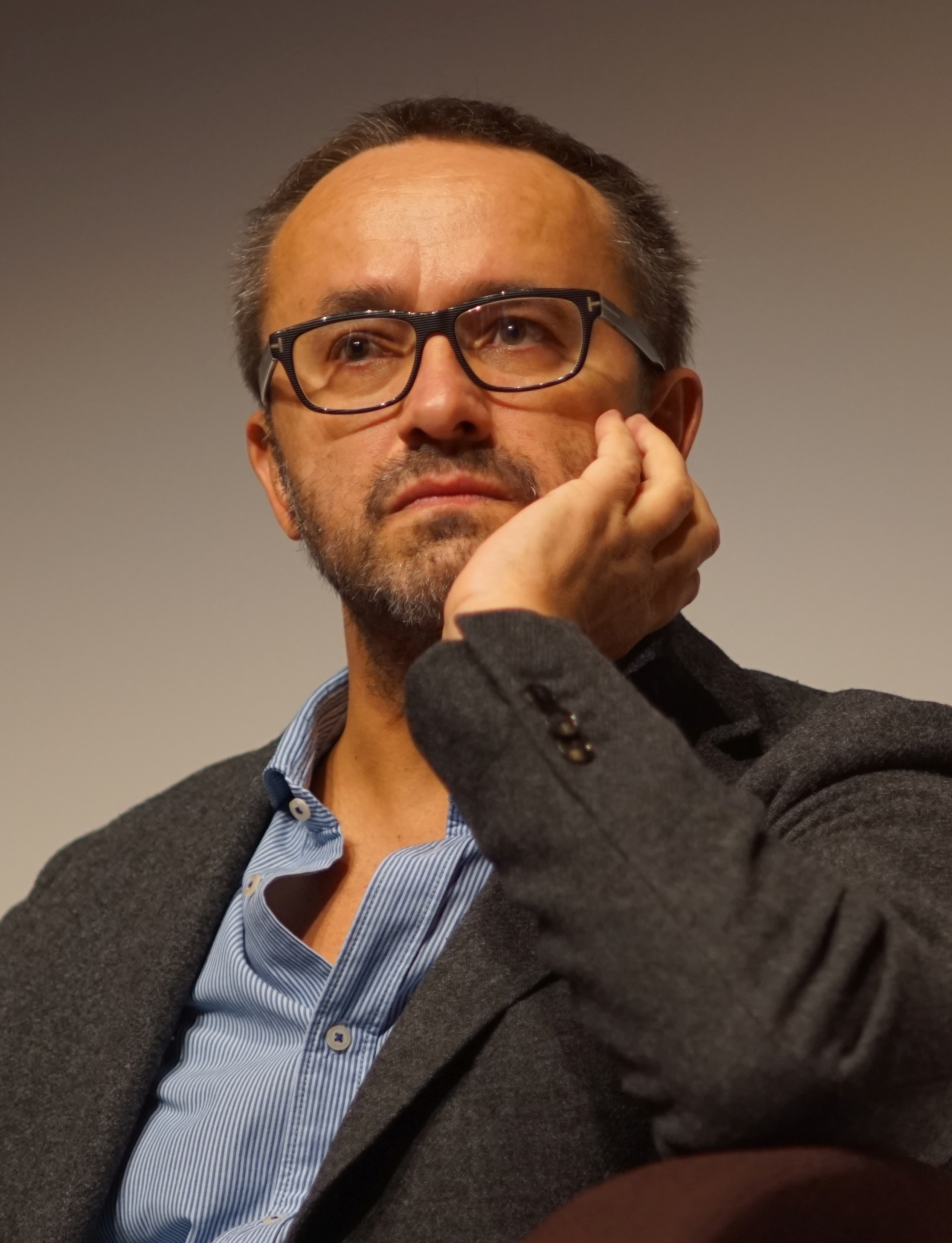
Andrey Zvyagintsev won for Leviathan (2014).

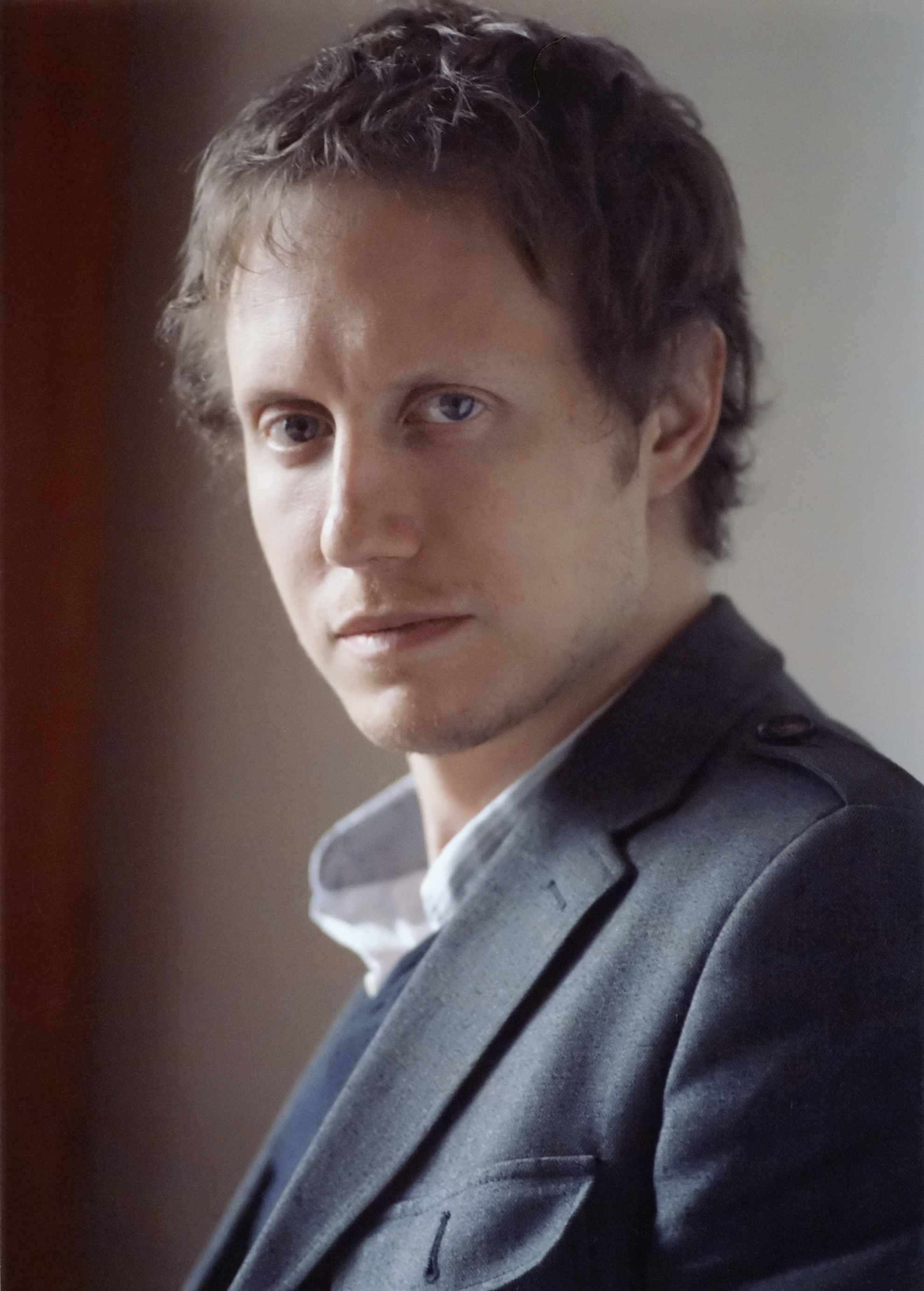
László Nemes won for Son of Saul (2015).

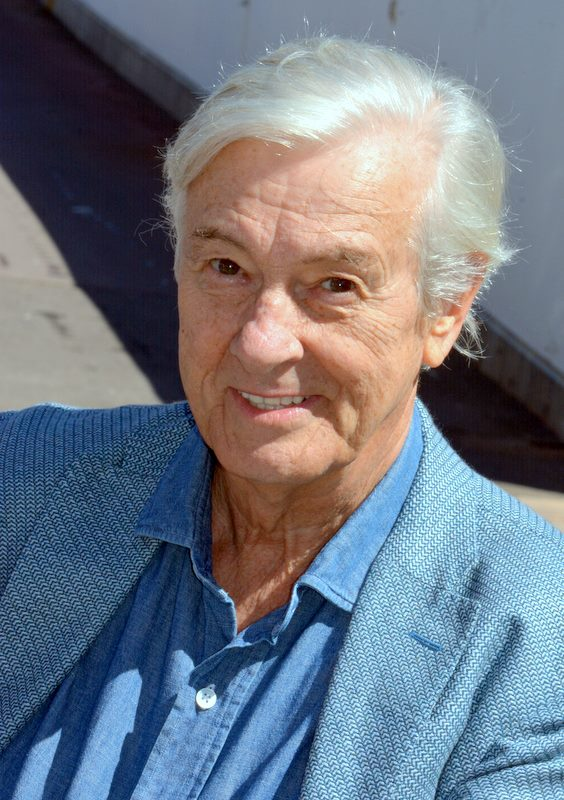
Paul Verhoeven won for Elle (2016).

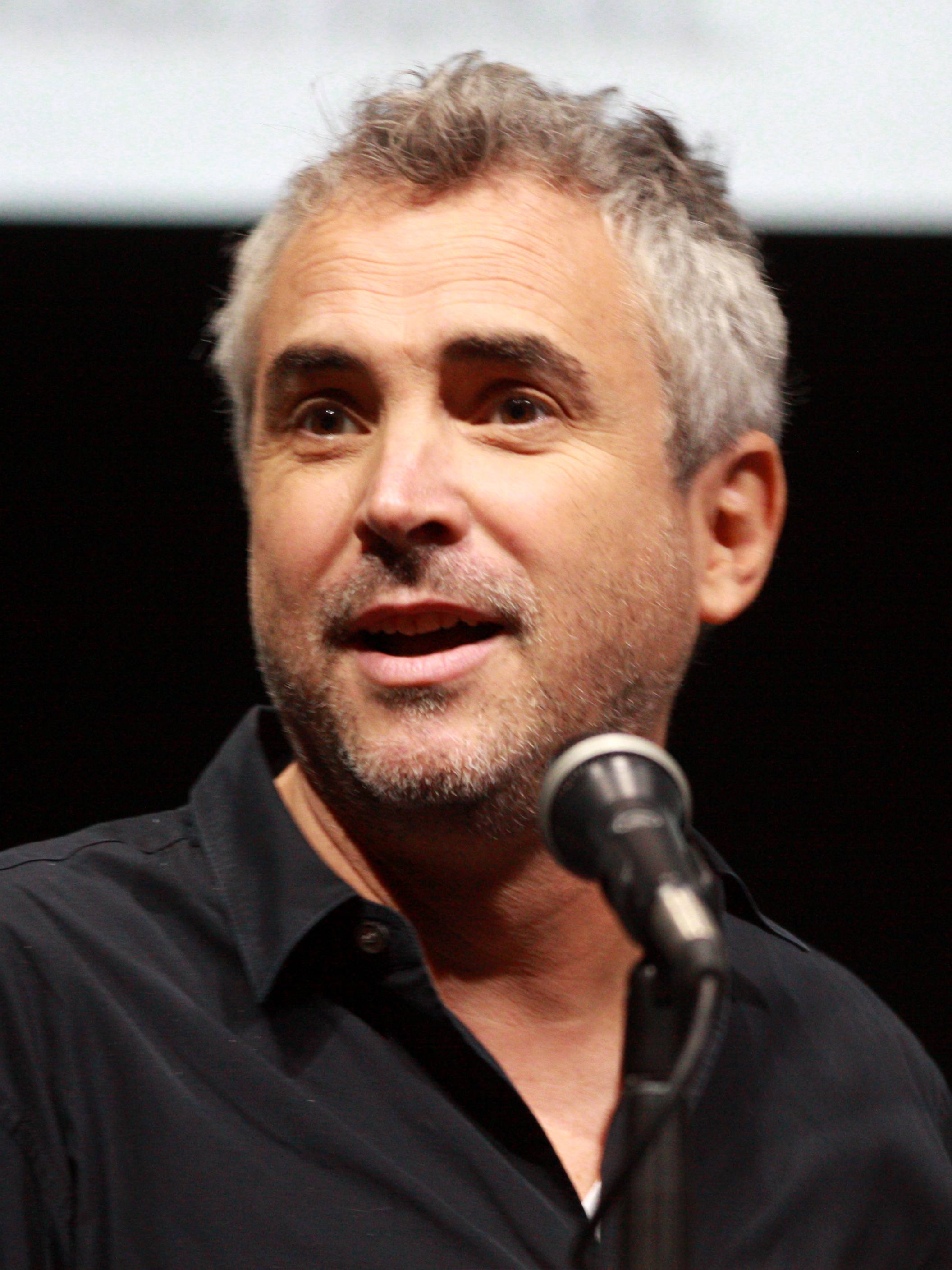
Alfonso Cuarón won for Roma (2018).

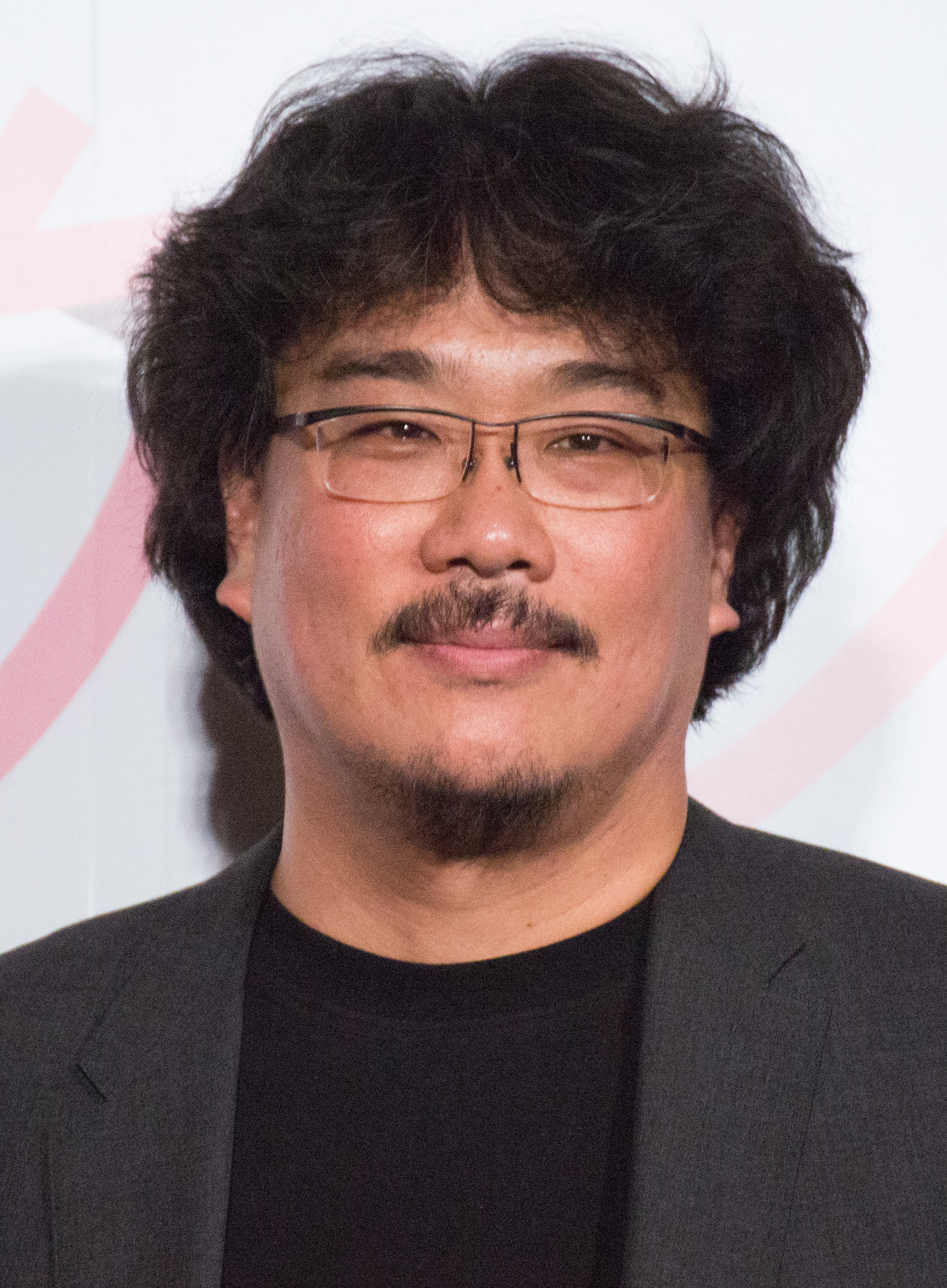
Bong Joon-ho won for Parasite (2019).

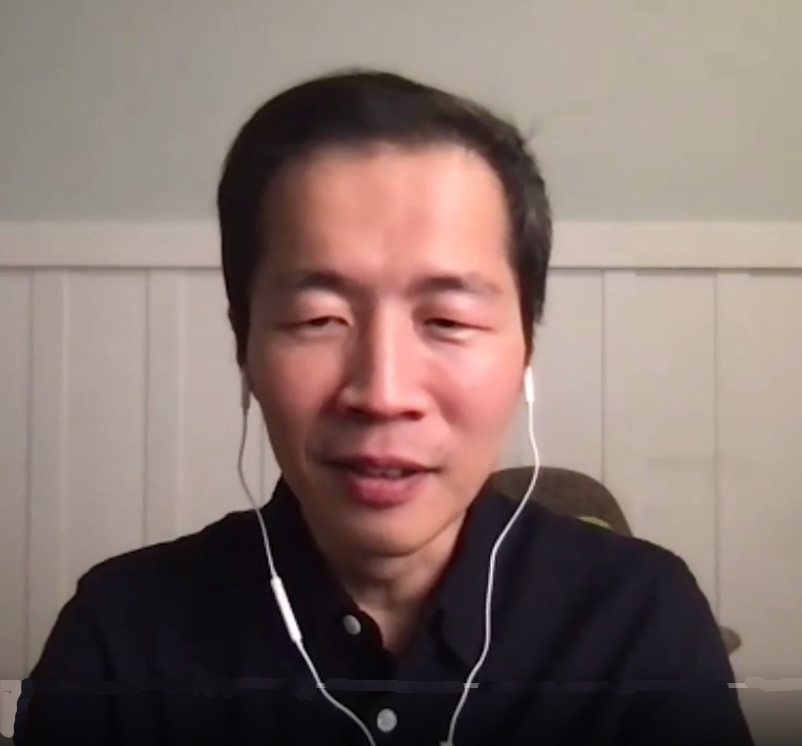
Lee Isaac Chung won for Minari (2020).

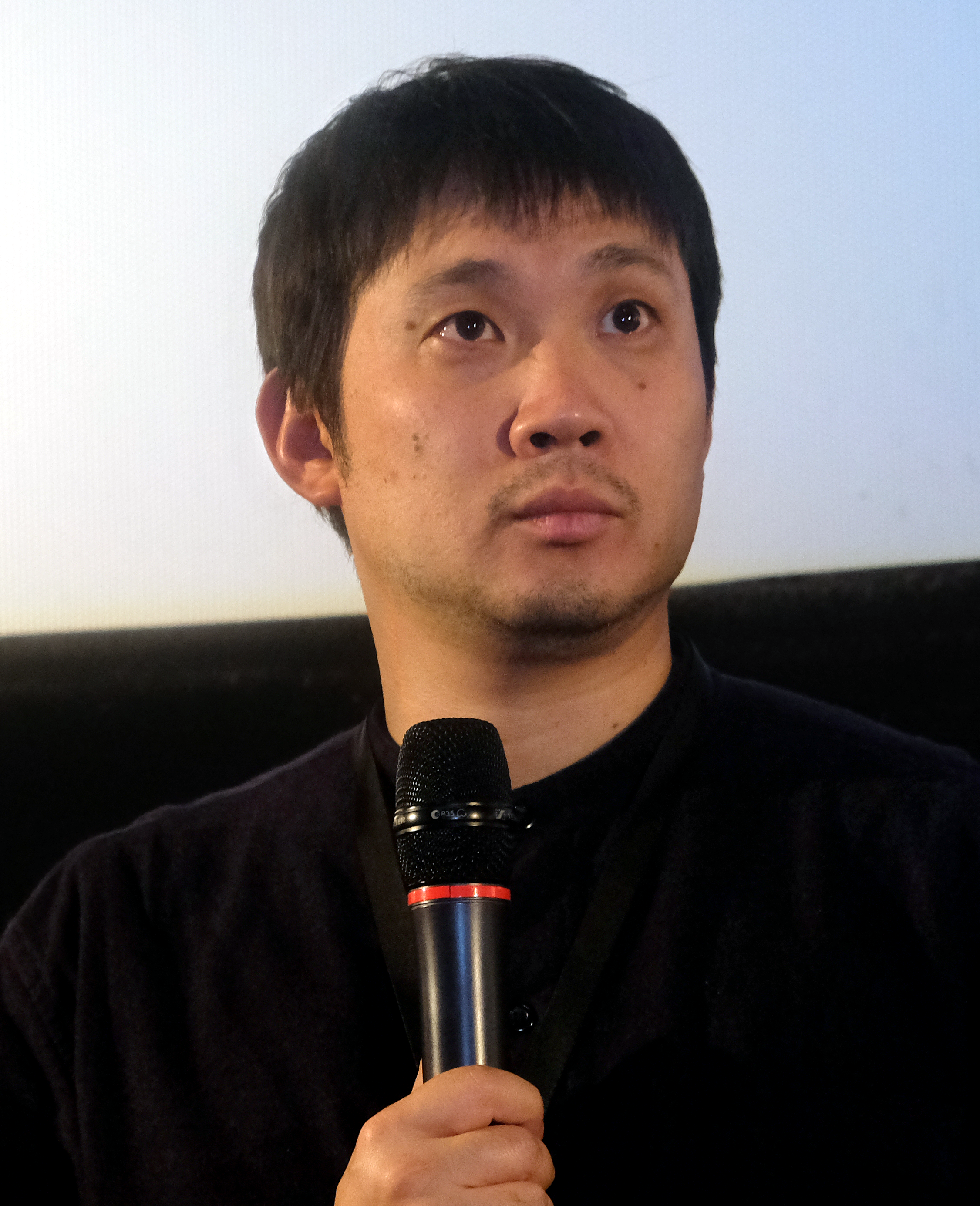
Ryusuke Hamaguchi won for Drive My Car (2021).

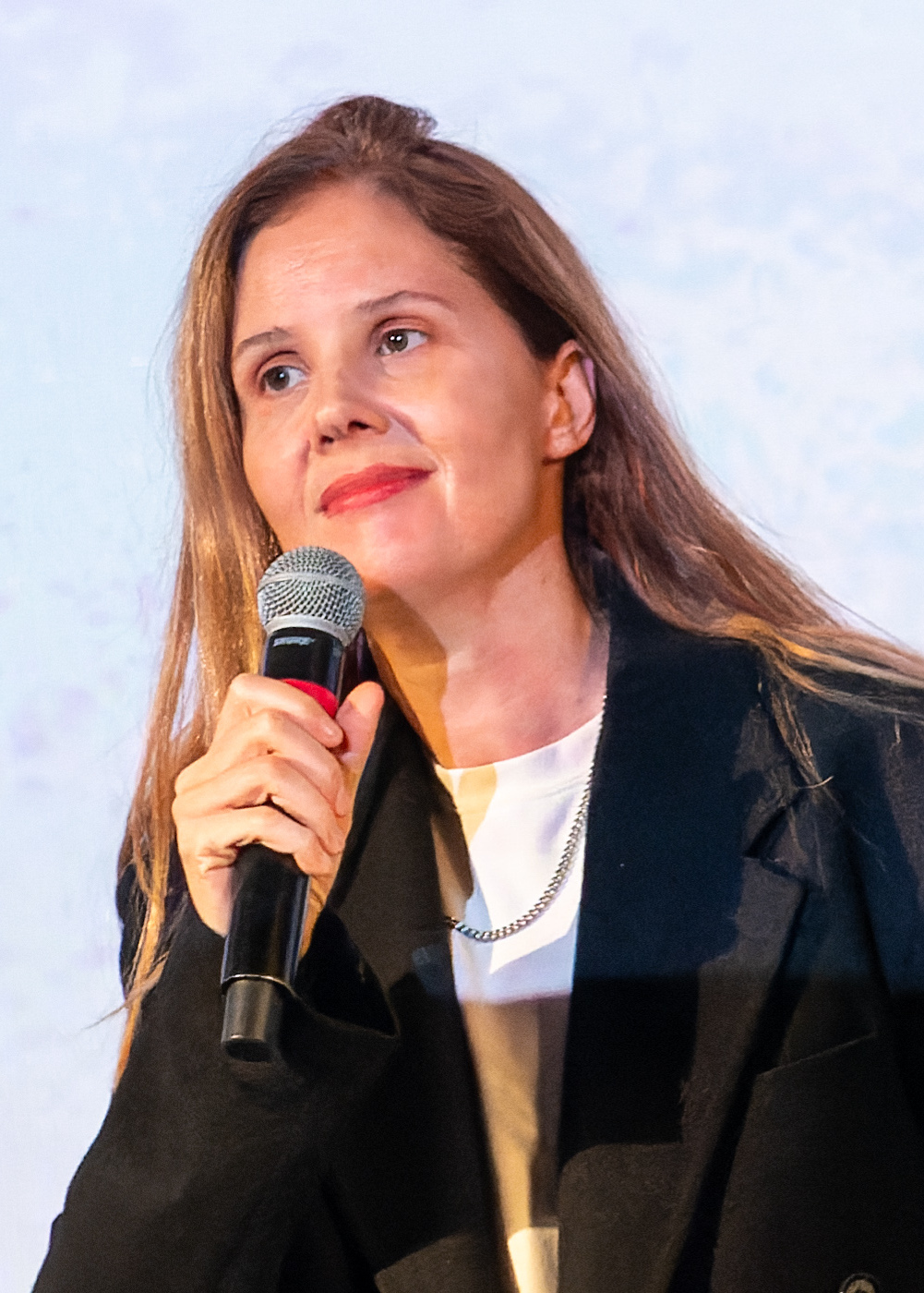
Justine Triet won for Anatomy of a Fall (2023).

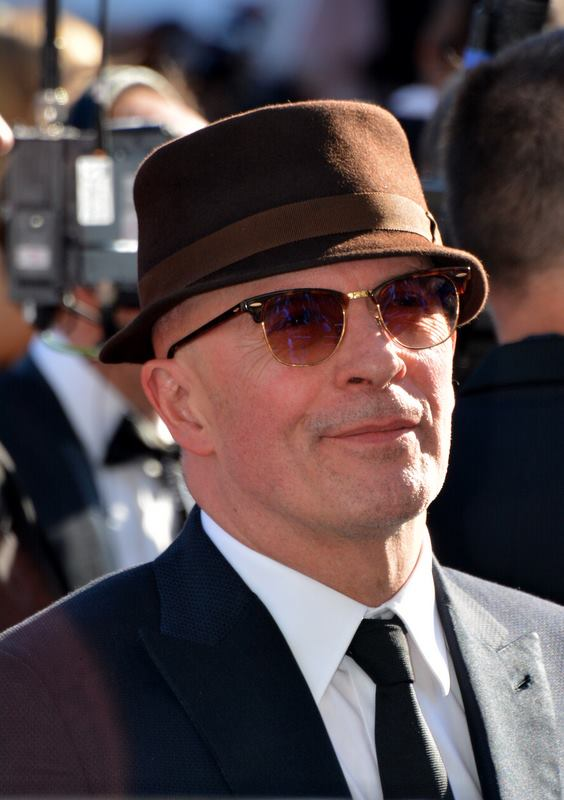
Jacques Audiard won for Emilia Perez (2024).

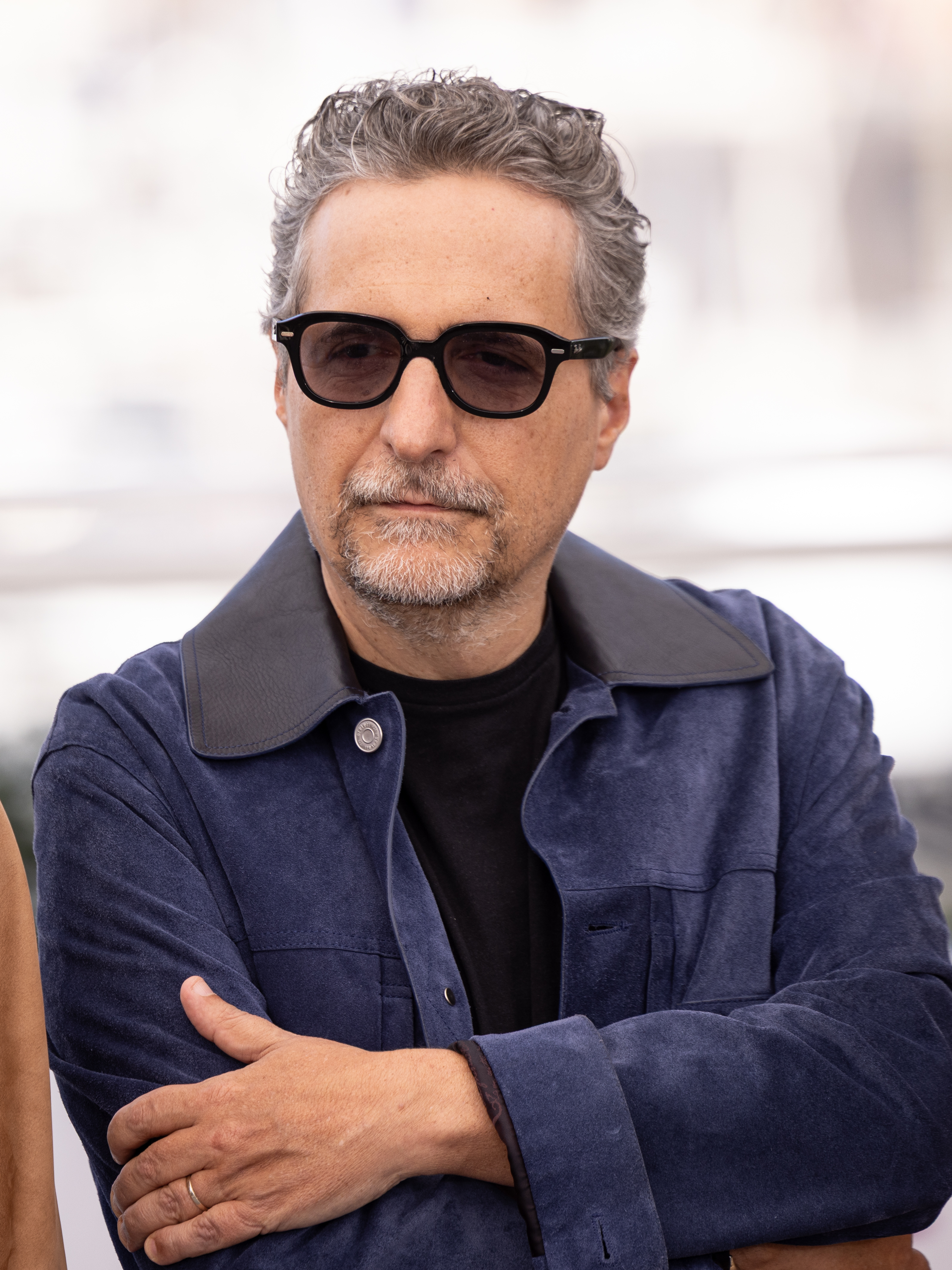
Kleber Mendonça Filho won for The Secret Agent (2025).

- 1965–1972: Best Foreign Film – Foreign Language
- 1973–1985: Best Foreign Film
- 1986–present: Best Foreign Language Film

=== 1940s ===
Year	English title	Original title	Director	Country
Best Foreign-Language Foreign Film
1949	Bicycle Thieves	Ladri di biciclette	Vittorio De Sica	Italy
1949	The Fallen Idol		Carol Reed	United Kingdom

=== 1950s ===
Year	English title	Original title	Director	Country
Best Foreign-Language Foreign Film
1954	Twenty-Four Eyes	Nijushi no hitomi	Keisuke Kinoshita	Japan
1954	No Way Back	Weg Ohne Umkehr	Victor Vicas	West Germany
1954	The Lady of the Camellias		Raymond Bernard	Argentina
1954	Genevieve		Henry Cornelius	United Kingdom
1955	The Word	Ordet	Carl Theodor Dreyer	Denmark
1955	Stella	Στέλλα	Michael Cacoyannis	Greece
1955	Children, Mother, and the General	Kinder, Mutter und Ein General	László Benedek	West Germany
1955	Eyes of Children	Kodomo no me	Yoshiro Kawazu	Japan
1955	Dangerous Curves	Curvas peligrosas	Tito Davison	Mexico
1956	Before Sundown	Vor Sonnenuntergang	Gottfried Reinhardt	West Germany
1956	A Girl in Black	To Koritsi me ta mavra	Michael Cacoyannis	Greece
1956	Roses on the Arm	Taiyo to bara	Keisuke Kinoshita	Japan
1956	War and Peace		King Vidor	Italy
1956	The White Reindeer	Valkoinen Peura	Erik Blomberg	Finland
1957	Confessions of Felix Krull	Bekenntnisse des Hochstaplers Felix Krull	Detlev Buck	West Germany
1957	Tizoc		Ismael Rodríguez	Mexico
1957	Yellow Crow	Kiiroi karasu	Heinosuke Gosho	Japan
1958	Girl and the River	L'Eau vive	François Villiers	France
1958	The Road a Year Long	Cesta duga godinu dana	Giuseppe De Santis	Yugoslavia
1958	Rosemary	Das Mädchen Rosemarie	Rolf Thiele	West Germany
1959	The Bridge	Die Brücke	Bernhard Wicki	West Germany
1959	Black Orpheus	Orfeu Negro	Marcel Camus	France
1959	Odd Obsession	Kagi	Kon Ichikawa	Japan
1959	Wild Strawberries	Smultronstället	Ingmar Bergman	Sweden
1959	Aren't We Wonderful?	Wir Wunderkinder	Kurt Hoffmann	West Germany

=== 1960s ===
Year	English title	Original title	Director	Country
Best Foreign-Language Foreign Film
1960	The Virgin Spring	Jungfrukällan	Ingmar Bergman	Sweden
1960	The Truth	La Vérité	Henri-Georges Clouzot	France
1961	Two Women	La ciociara	Vittorio De Sica	Italy
1962	Divorce Italian Style	Divorzio all'italiana	Pietro Germi	Italy
1963	Any Number Can Win	Mélodie en sous-sol	Henri Verneuil	France
1964	Marriage Italian Style	Matrimonio all'italiana	Vittorio De Sica	Italy
1964	Sallah Shabati	סאלח שבתי	Ephraim Kishon	Israel
Best Foreign Film – Foreign Language
1965	Juliet of the Spirits	Giulietta degli spiriti	Federico Fellini	Italy
1965	Always Further On	Tarahumara, cada vez más lejos	Luis Alcoriza	Mexico
1965	Circle of Love	La ronde	Roger Vadim	France
1965	Red Beard	赤ひげ	Akira Kurosawa	Japan
1965	The Umbrellas of Cherbourg	Les parapluies de Cherbourg	Jacques Demy	France
1966	A Man and a Woman	Un homme et une femme	Claude Lelouch	France
1966	The Birds, the Bees and the Italians	Signore & signori	Pietro Germi	Italy
1966	Hamlet	Гамлет	Grigori Kozintsev	Soviet Union
1966	Impossible on Saturday	Pas question le samedi	Alex Joffé	France
1966	Loves of a Blonde	Lásky jedné plavovlásky	Miloš Forman	Czechoslovakia
1967	Live for Life	Vivre pour vivre	Claude Lelouch	France
1967	The Climax		Pietro Germi	Italy
1967	Closely Watched Trains	Ostře sledované vlaky	Jiří Menzel	Czechoslovakia
1967	Elvira Madigan		Bo Widerberg	Sweden
1967	The Stranger	Lo straniero	Luchino Visconti	Italy
1968	War and Peace	Война и мир	Sergei Bondarchuk	Soviet Union
1968	The Bride Wore Black	La mariée était en noir	François Truffaut	France
1968	I Even Met Happy Gypsies	Skupljači perja	Aleksandar Petrović	Yugoslavia
1968	Shame	Skammen	Ingmar Bergman	Sweden
1968	Stolen Kisses	Baisers volés	François Truffaut	France
1969	Z		Costa-Gavras	Algeria
1969	Ådalen 31	Ådalen '31	Bo Widerberg	Sweden
1969	Blaumilch Canal	Te'alat Blaumilch	Ephraim Kishon	Israel
1969	Girls in the Sun	Κορίτσια στον Ήλιο	Vasilis Georgiadis	Greece
1969	Fellini Satyricon		Federico Fellini	Italy

=== 1970s ===
Year	English title	Original title	Director	Country
1970	Rider on the Rain	Le Passager de la Pluie	René Clément	France
1970	Borsalino		Jacques Deray	Italy
1970	The Confession	L'aveu	Costa-Gavras	France
1970	The Customer of the Off Season	אורח בעונה מתה	Moshé Mizrahi	France, Israel
1970	Investigation of a Citizen Above Suspicion	Indagine su un cittadino al di sopra di ogni sospetto	Elio Petri	Italy
1971	The Policeman	השוטר אזולאי	Ephraim Kishon	Israel
1971	Claire's Knee	Le genou de Claire	Éric Rohmer	France
1971	The Conformist	Il conformista	Bernardo Bertolucci	Italy
1971	Tchaikovsky	Чайковский	Igor Talankin	Soviet Union
1971	To Die of Love	Mourir d'aimer	André Cayatte	France
1972	The Emigrants	Utvandrarna	Jan Troell	Sweden
1972	The New Land	Nybyggarna	Jan Troell	Sweden
1972	Cries and Whispers	Viskningar och rop	Ingmar Bergman	Sweden
1972	The Discreet Charm of the Bourgeoisie	Le charme discret de la bourgeoisie	Luis Buñuel	France
1972	Mirage	Espejismo	Armando Robles Godoy	Peru
1972	Roma		Federico Fellini	Italy
Best Foreign Film
1973	The Pedestrian	Der Fußgänger	Maximilian Schell	West Germany
1973	Alfredo, Alfredo		Pietro Germi	Italy
1973	Day for Night	La nuit américaine	François Truffaut	France
1973	Kazablan		Menahem Golan	Israel
1973	State of Siege	État de siège	Costa-Gavras	France
1974	Scenes from a Marriage	Scener ur ett äktenskap	Ingmar Bergman	Sweden
1974	The Mad Adventures of Rabbi Jacob	Les aventures de Rabbi Jacob	Gérard Oury	France
1974	The Apprenticeship of Duddy Kravitz		Ted Kotcheff	Canada
1974	Amarcord		Federico Fellini	Italy
1974	Lacombe, Lucien		Louis Malle	France
1975	Lies My Father Told Me		Ján Kadár	Canada
1975	And Now My Love	Toute une vie	Claude Lelouch	France
1975	Hedda		Trevor Nunn	United Kingdom
1975	The Magic Flute	Trollflöjten	Ingmar Bergman	Sweden
1975	Special Section	Section spéciale	Costa-Gavras	France
1976	Face to Face	Ansikte mot ansikte	Ingmar Bergman	Sweden
1976	Cousin Cousine		Jean-Charles Tacchella	France
1976	Pocket Money	L'argent de poche	François Truffaut	France
1976	Seven Beauties	Pasqualino Settebellezze	Lina Wertmüller	Italy
1976	The Slipper and the Rose: The Story of Cinderella		Bryan Forbes	United Kingdom
1977	A Special Day	Una giornata particolare	Ettore Scola	Italy
1977	An Elephant Can Be Extremely Deceptive	Un éléphant ça trompe énormément	Yves Robert	France
1977	Madame Rosa	La vie devant soi	Moshé Mizrahi	France
1977	That Obscure Object of Desire	Cet obscur objet du désir	Luis Buñuel	France
1977	Raise Ravens	Cría cuervos	Carlos Saura	Spain
1978	Autumn Sonata	Höstsonaten	Ingmar Bergman	Sweden
1978	Death on the Nile		John Guillermin	England
1978	Dona Flor and Her Two Husbands	Dona Flor e seus dois maridos	Bruno Barreto	Brazil
1978	A Dream of Passion	Κραυγή Γυναικών	Jules Dassin	Greece
1978	Get Out Your Handkerchiefs	Préparez vos mouchoirs	Bertrand Blier	France
1978	Going All the Way	Eskimo Limon	Boaz Davidson	Israel
1979	La cage aux folles		Édouard Molinaro	France, Italy
1979	The Marriage of Maria Braun	Die Ehe der Maria Braun	Rainer Werner Fassbinder	West Germany
1979	The Europeans		James Ivory	United Kingdom
1979	Till Marriage Do Us Part	Mio Dio come sono caduta in basso!	Luigi Comencini	Italy
1979	Soldier of Orange	Soldaat van Oranje	Paul Verhoeven	Netherlands

=== 1980s ===
Year	English title	Original title	Director	Country
1980	Tess		Roman Polanski	United Kingdom
1980	Breaker Morant		Bruce Beresford	Australia
1980	The Last Metro	Le dernier métro	François Truffaut	France
1980	My Brilliant Career		Gillian Armstrong	Australia
1980	Shadow Warrior	影武者	Akira Kurosawa	Japan
1980	Special Treatment	Poseban tretman	Goran Paskaljević	Yugoslavia
1981	Chariots of Fire		Hugh Hudson	United Kingdom
1981	Atlantic City		Louis Malle	Canada
1981	The Boat	Das Boot	Wolfgang Petersen	West Germany
1981	Gallipoli		Peter Weir	Australia
1981	Pixote: The Law of the Weakest	Pixote: A lei do mais fraco	Héctor Babenco	Brazil
1982	Gandhi		Richard Attenborough	India
1982	Fitzcarraldo		Werner Herzog	West Germany
1982	The Man from Snowy River		George T. Miller	Australia
1982	Quest for Fire	La guerre du feu	Jean-Jacques Annaud	Canada
1982	La traviata		Franco Zeffirelli	Italy
1982	The Way	Yol	Yılmaz Güney & Şerif Gören	Switzerland
1983	Fanny and Alexander	Fanny och Alexander	Ingmar Bergman	Sweden
1983	Carmen		Carlos Saura	Spain
1983	The Dresser		Peter Yates	United Kingdom
1983	Educating Rita		Lewis Gilbert	United Kingdom
1983	The Grey Fox		Phillip Borsos	Canada
1984	A Passage to India		David Lean	United Kingdom
1984	Carmen		Francesco Rosi	France
1984	Dangerous Moves	La diagonale du fou	Richard Dembo	Switzerland
1984	Paris, Texas		Wim Wenders	France, Germany
1984	A Sunday in the Country	Un dimanche à la campagne	Bertrand Tavernier	France
1985	The Official Story	La historia oficial	Luis Puenzo	Argentina
1985	Colonel Redl	Oberst Redl	István Szabó	Hungary
1985	Ran	乱	Akira Kurosawa	Japan
1985	When Father Was Away on Business	Otac na sluzbenom putu	Emir Kusturica	Yugoslavia
1985	A Year of the Quiet Sun	Rok spokojnego słońca	Krzysztof Zanussi	Poland
Best Foreign Language Film
1986	The Assault	De aanslag	Fons Rademakers	Netherlands
1986	Betty Blue	37°2 le matin	Jean-Jacques Beineix	France
1986	Ginger and Fred	Ginger e Fred	Federico Fellini	Italy
1986	Otello		Federico Fellini	Italy
1986	Three Men and a Cradle	3 hommes et un couffin	Coline Serreau	France
1987	My Life as a Dog	Mitt liv som hund	Lasse Hallström	Sweden
1987	Dark Eyes	Oci ciornie	Nikita Mikhalkov	Italy
1987	Goodbye, Children	Au revoir, les enfants	Louis Malle	France
1987	Jean de Florette		Claude Berri	France
1987	Repentance	მონანიება	Tengiz Abuladze	Soviet Union
1988	Pelle the Conqueror	Pelle erobreren	Bille August	Denmark
1988	Babette's Feast	Babettes gæstebud	Gabriel Axel	Denmark
1988	Hanussen		István Szabó	Hungary
1988	Salaam Bombay!		Mira Nair	India
1988	Women on the Verge of a Nervous Breakdown	Mujeres al borde de un ataque de nervios	Pedro Almodóvar	Spain
1989	Cinema Paradiso	Nuovo cinema Paradiso	Giuseppe Tornatore	Italy
1989	Camille Claudel		Bruno Nuytten	France
1989	Jesus of Montreal	Jésus de Montréal	Denys Arcand	Canada
1989	My Uncle's Legacy	Život sa stricem	Krsto Papić	Yugoslavia
1989	Story of Women	Une affaire de femmes	Claude Chabrol	France

=== 1990s ===
Year	English title	Original title	Director	Country
1990	Cyrano de Bergerac		Jean-Paul Rappeneau	France
1990	Dreams	夢	Akira Kurosawa	Japan
1990	The Nasty Girl	Das schreckliche Mädchen	Michael Verhoeven	West Germany
1990	Requiem for Dominic	Requiem für Dominik	Robert Dornhelm	Austria
1990	Taxi Blues	Такси-блюз	Pavel Lungin	Soviet Union
1991	Europa Europa		Agnieszka Holland	Germany
1991	The Double Life of Véronique	La double vie de Véronique	Krzysztof Kieślowski	France
1991	High Heels	Tacones lejanos	Pedro Almodóvar	Spain
1991	Madame Bovary		Claude Chabrol	France
1991	La Femme Nikita	Nikita	Luc Besson	France
1991	Lost in Siberia	Zateryannyy v Sibiri	Alexander Mitta	Soviet Union
1992	Indochine		Régis Wargnier	France
1992	All the Mornings of the World	Tous les matins du monde	Alain Corneau	France
1992	Close to Eden	Urga	Nikita Mikhalkov	Russia
1992	Like Water for Chocolate	Como agua para chocolate	Alfonso Arau	Mexico
1992	Schtonk!		Helmut Dietl	Germany
1993	Farewell My Concubine	霸王別姬	Chen Kaige	Hong Kong
1993	Flight of the Innocent	La corsa dell'innocente	Carlo Carlei	Italy
1993	Justice	Justiz	Hans W. Geißendörfer	Germany
1993	Three Colors: Blue	Trois couleurs: Bleu	Krzysztof Kieślowski	France
1993	The Wedding Banquet	喜宴	Ang Lee	Taiwan
1994	Farinelli		Gérard Corbiau	Belgium
1994	Eat Drink Man Woman	飲食男女	Ang Lee	Taiwan
1994	To Live	活著	Zhang Yimou	China
1994	Queen Margot	La reine Margot	Patrice Chéreau	France
1994	Three Colors: Red	Trois couleurs: Rouge	Krzysztof Kieślowski	Switzerland
1995	Les Misérables		Claude Lelouch	France
1995	Brother of Sleep	Schlafes Bruder	Joseph Vilsmaier	Germany
1995	French Twist	Gazon maudit	Josiane Balasko	France
1995	Like Two Crocodiles	Come due coccodrilli	Giacomo Campiotti	Italy
1995	Shanghai Triad	搖啊搖，搖到外婆橋	Zhang Yimou	China
1996	Kolya	Kolja	Jan Svěrák	Czech Republic
1996	The Eighth Day	Le huitième jour	Jaco Van Dormael	Belgium
1996	Luna e l'altra		Maurizio Nichetti	Italy
1996	Prisoner of the Mountains	Кавказский пленник / Kavkazskiy plennik	Sergei Bodrov	Russia
1996	Ridicule		Patrice Leconte	France
1997	My Life in Pink	Ma vie en rose	Alain Berliner	Belgium
1997	Artemisia		Agnès Merlet	France
1997	The Best Man	Il testimone dello sposo	Pupi Avati	Italy
1997	Lea		Ivan Fíla	Germany
1997	The Thief	Вор	Pavel Chukhray	Russia
1998	Central Station	Central do Brasil	Walter Salles	Brazil
1998	The Celebration	Festen	Thomas Vinterberg	Denmark
1998	Men with Guns		John Sayles	United States
1998	The Polish Bride	De Poolse bruid	Karim Traïdia	Netherlands
1998	Tango	Tango, no me dejes nunca	Carlos Saura	Argentina
1999	All About My Mother	Todo sobre mi madre	Pedro Almodóvar	Spain
1999	Aimée & Jaguar		Max Färberböck	Germany
1999	East/West	Est-Ouest	Régis Wargnier	France
1999	Girl on the Bridge	La fille sur le pont	Patrice Leconte	France
1999	The Red Violin	Le violon rouge	François Girard	Canada

=== 2000s ===
Year	English title	Original title	Director	Country
2000	Crouching Tiger, Hidden Dragon	臥虎藏龍	Ang Lee	Taiwan
2000	Amores perros		Alejandro González Iñárritu	Mexico
2000	Malèna		Giuseppe Tornatore	Italy
2000	One Hundred Steps	I cento passi	Marco Tullio Giordana	Italy
2000	The Widow of Saint-Pierre	La veuve de Saint-Pierre	Patrice Leconte	France
2001	No Man's Land		Danis Tanović	Bosnia and Herzegovina
2001	Amélie	Le fabuleux destin d'Amélie Poulain	Jean-Pierre Jeunet	France
2001	Behind the Sun	Abril despedaçado	Walter Salles	Brazil
2001	Monsoon Wedding		Mira Nair	India
2001	Y tu mamá también		Alfonso Cuarón	Mexico
2002	Talk to Her	Hable con ella	Pedro Almodóvar	Spain
2002	Balzac and the Little Chinese Seamstress	Balzac et la petite tailleuse chinoise	Dai Sijie	France
2002	City of God	Cidade de Deus	Fernando Meirelles	Brazil
2002	The Crime of Father Amaro	El crimen del padre Amaro	Carlos Carrera	Mexico
2002	Hero	英雄	Zhang Yimou	China
2002	Nowhere in Africa	Nirgendwo in Afrika	Caroline Link	Germany
2003	Osama	أسامة	Siddiq Barmak	Afghanistan
2003	The Barbarian Invasions	Les invasions barbares	Denys Arcand	Canada
2003	Good Bye, Lenin!		Wolfgang Becker	Germany
2003	Monsieur Ibrahim	Monsieur Ibrahim et les fleurs du Coran	François Dupeyron	France
2003	The Return	Возвращение	Andrey Zvyagintsev	Russia
2004	The Sea Inside	Mar adentro	Alejandro Amenábar	Spain
2004	The Chorus	Les choristes	Christophe Barratier	France
2004	House of Flying Daggers	十面埋伏	Zhang Yimou	China
2004	The Motorcycle Diaries	Diários de Motocicleta	Walter Salles	Argentina, Brazil
2004	A Very Long Engagement	Un long dimanche de fiançailles	Jean-Pierre Jeunet	France
2005	Paradise Now	الجنّة الآن	Hany Abu-Assad	Palestine
2005	Kung Fu Hustle	功夫	Stephen Chow	China
2005	Merry Christmas	Joyeux Noël	Christian Carion	France
2005	The Promise	無極	Chen Kaige	China
2005	Tsotsi		Gavin Hood	South Africa
2006	Letters from Iwo Jima		Clint Eastwood	United States
2006	Apocalypto		Mel Gibson	United States
2006	The Lives of Others	Das Leben der Anderen	Florian Henckel von Donnersmarck	Germany
2006	Pan's Labyrinth	El laberinto del fauno	Guillermo del Toro	Mexico
2006	Volver		Pedro Almodóvar	Spain
2007	The Diving Bell and the Butterfly	Le scaphandre et le papillon	Julian Schnabel	France, United States
2007	4 Months, 3 Weeks and 2 Days	4 luni, 3 săptămâni şi 2 zile	Cristian Mungiu	Romania
2007	The Kite Runner		Marc Forster	United States
2007	Lust, Caution	色, 戒	Ang Lee	Taiwan
2007	Persepolis		Vincent Paronnaud and Marjane Satrapi	France
2008	Waltz with Bashir	ואלס עם באשיר	Ari Folman	Israel
2008	The Baader Meinhof Complex	Der Baader Meinhof Komplex	Uli Edel	Germany
2008	Everlasting Moments	Maria Larssons eviga ögonblick	Jan Troell	Sweden, Denmark
2008	Gomorrah	Gomorra	Matteo Garrone	Italy
2008	I've Loved You So Long	Il y a longtemps que je t'aime	Philippe Claudel	France
2009	The White Ribbon	Das weiße Band	Michael Haneke	Germany
2009	Baarìa		Giuseppe Tornatore	Italy
2009	Broken Embraces	Los abrazos rotos	Pedro Almodóvar	Spain
2009	The Maid	La Nana	Sebastián Silva	Chile
2009	A Prophet	Un prophète	Jacques Audiard	France

=== 2010s ===
Year	English title	Original title	Director	Country
2010	In a Better World	Hævnen	Susanne Bier	Denmark
2010	Biutiful		Alejandro González Iñárritu	Spain, Mexico
2010	The Concert	Le Concert	Radu Mihăileanu	France
2010	The Edge	Край	Alexei Uchitel	Russia
2010	I Am Love	Io Sono L'amore	Luca Guadagnino	Italy
2011	A Separation	جدایی نادر از سیمین	Asghar Farhadi	Iran
2011	In the Land of Blood and Honey		Angelina Jolie	United States
2011	The Flowers of War	金陵十三钗	Zhang Yimou	China
2011	The Kid with a Bike	Le Gamin au vélo	Jean-Pierre & Luc Dardenne	Belgium
2011	The Skin I Live In	La piel que habito	Pedro Almodóvar	Spain
2012	Amour		Michael Haneke	Austria
2012	A Royal Affair	En kongelig affære	Nikolaj Arcel	Denmark
2012	The Intouchables	Intouchables	Éric Toledano and Olivier Nakache	France
2012	Rust and Bone	De rouille et d'os	Jacques Audiard	France
2012	Kon-Tiki		Joachim Rønning & Espen Sandberg	Norway, United Kingdom, Denmark
2013	The Great Beauty	La grande bellezza	Paolo Sorrentino	Italy
2013	Blue Is the Warmest Colour	La Vie d'Adèle – Chapitres 1 & 2	Abdellatif Kechiche	France
2013	The Hunt	Jagten	Thomas Vinterberg	Denmark
2013	The Past	Le Passé	Asghar Farhadi	Iran
2013	The Wind Rises	風立ちぬ	Hayao Miyazaki	Japan
2014	Leviathan	Левиафан	Andrey Zvyagintsev	Russia
2014	Ida		Paweł Pawlikowski	Poland
2014	Tangerines	მანდარინები	Zaza Urushadze	Estonia
2014	Force Majeure	Turist	Ruben Östlund	Sweden
2014	Gett: The Trial of Viviane Amsalem	גט - המשפט של ויויאן אמסלם	Ronit Elkabetz	Israel
2015	Son of Saul	Saul fia	László Nemes	Hungary
2015	The Brand New Testament	Le Tout Nouveau Testament	Jaco Van Dormael	Belgium, France, Luxembourg
2015	The Club	El Club	Pablo Larraín	Chile
2015	The Fencer	Miekkailija / Vehkleja	Klaus Härö	Finland, Estonia
2015	Mustang		Deniz Gamze Ergüven	France
2016	Elle		Paul Verhoeven	France
2016	Divines		Houda Benyamina	France
2016	Neruda		Pablo Larraín	Chile
2016	The Salesman	فروشنده	Asghar Farhadi	Iran
2016	Toni Erdmann		Maren Ade	Germany
2017	In the Fade	Aus dem Nichts	Fatih Akin	Germany
2017	A Fantastic Woman	Una Mujer Fantástica	Sebastián Lelio	Chile
2017	First They Killed My Father		Angelina Jolie	Cambodia
2017	Loveless	Нелюбовь	Andrey Zvyagintsev	Russia
2017	The Square		Ruben Östlund	Sweden
2018	Roma		Alfonso Cuarón	Mexico
2018	Capernaum	کفرناحوم	Nadine Labaki	Lebanon
2018	Girl		Lukas Dhont	Belgium
2018	Never Look Away	Werk ohne Autor	Florian Henckel von Donnersmarck	Germany
2018	Shoplifters	万引き家族	Hirokazu Kore-eda	Japan
2019	Parasite	기생충	Bong Joon-ho	South Korea
2019	The Farewell		Lulu Wang	United States
2019	Les Misérables		Ladj Ly	France
2019	Pain and Glory	Dolor y gloria	Pedro Almodóvar	Spain
2019	Portrait of a Lady on Fire	Portrait de la jeune fille en feu	Céline Sciamma	France

=== 2020s ===
Year	English title	Original title	Director	Country
2020	Minari		Lee Isaac Chung	United States
2020	Another Round	Druk	Thomas Vinterberg	Denmark
2020	La Llorona		Jayro Bustamante	Guatemala
2020	The Life Ahead	La vita davanti a sé	Edoardo Ponti	Italy
2020	Two of Us	Deux	Filippo Meneghetti	France
2021	Drive My Car	ドライブ・マイ・カー	Ryusuke Hamaguchi	Japan
2021	Compartment No. 6	Hytti nro 6	Juho Kuosmanen	Germany, Finland, Russia
2021	The Hand of God	È stata la mano di Dio	Paolo Sorrentino	Italy
2021	A Hero	قهرمان	Asghar Farhadi	France, Iran
2021	Parallel Mothers	Madres paralelas	Pedro Almodóvar	Spain
2022	Argentina, 1985		Santiago Mitre	Argentina
2022	All Quiet on the Western Front	Im Westen nichts Neues	Edward Berger	Germany
2022	Close		Lukas Dhont	Belgium
2022	Decision to Leave	헤어질 결심	Park Chan-wook	South Korea
2022	RRR		S. S. Rajamouli	India
2023	Anatomy of a Fall	Anatomie d'une chute	Justine Triet	France
2023	Fallen Leaves	Kuolleet lehdet	Aki Kaurismäki	Finland
2023	Io capitano		Matteo Garrone	Italy
2023	Past Lives		Celine Song	United States
2023	Society of the Snow	La sociedad de la nieve	J. A. Bayona	Spain
2023	The Zone of Interest		Jonathan Glazer	United Kingdom, Poland
2024	Emilia Pérez		Jacques Audiard	France
2024	All We Imagine as Light	പ്രഭയായ് നിനച്ചതെല്ലാം	Payal Kapadia	India
2024	The Girl with the Needle	Pigen med nålen	Magnus von Horn	Denmark
2024	I'm Still Here	Ainda Estou Aqui	Walter Salles	Brazil
2024	The Seed of the Sacred Fig	دانه‌ی انجیر معابد	Mohammad Rasoulof	Germany
2024	Vermiglio		Maura Delpero	Italy
2025	The Secret Agent	O Agente Secreto	Kleber Mendonça Filho	Brazil
2025	It Was Just an Accident	یک تصادف ساده	Jafar Panahi	Iran, France
2025	No Other Choice	어쩔수가없다	Park Chan-wook	South Korea
2025	Sentimental Value	Affeksjonsverdi	Joachim Trier	Norway, France, Germany, Denmark, Sweden, United Kingdom
2025	Sirāt		Oliver Laxe	Spain, France
2025	The Voice of Hind Rajab	صوت هند رجب	Kaouther Ben Hania	Tunisia, France

== Multiple winners ==
Nine directors have won the award multiple times.

Wins	Director
6	Ingmar Bergman
3	Vittorio De Sica
3	Claude Lelouch
2	Pedro Almodóvar
2	Michael Cacoyannis
2	Michael Haneke
2	Kurt Hoffmann
2	Keisuke Kinoshita
2	Jan Troell
2	Ephraim Kishon

== See also ==
- BAFTA Award for Best Film Not in the English Language
- Critics' Choice Movie Award for Best Foreign Language Film
- Academy Award for Best International Feature Film (List of Academy Award winners and nominees for Best International Feature Film)
- Saturn Award for Best International Film
