= List of submissions to the 57th Academy Awards for Best Foreign Language Film =

1984 Best Foreign Language Film submissions

Highlights
- Oscar winner: (Switzerland) Dangerous Moves
- Submissions: 32
- Debuts: 1

This is a list of submissions to the 57th Academy Awards for Best Foreign Language Film. The Academy Award for Best Foreign Language Film was created in 1956 by the Academy of Motion Picture Arts and Sciences to honour non-English-speaking films produced outside the United States. The award is handed out annually, and is accepted by the winning film's director, although it is considered an award for the submitting country as a whole. Countries are invited by the Academy to submit their best films for competition according to strict rules, with only one film being accepted from each country.

For the 57th Academy Awards, thirty-two films were submitted in the category Academy Award for Best Foreign Language Film. Thailand submitted a film for the first time. The five nominated films came from Argentina, Israel, Spain, Soviet Union and Switzerland.

Switzerland won for the first time with Dangerous Moves by Richard Dembo.

== Submissions ==
Submitting country	Film title used in nomination	Original title	Language(s)	Director(s)	Result
Argentina	Camila		Spanish	María Luisa Bemberg	Nominated
Austria	Just Behind the Door	Dicht hinter der Tür	German	Mansur Madavi	Not nominated
Brazil	Memoirs of Prison	Memórias do Cárcere	Brazilian Portuguese	Nelson Pereira dos Santos	Not nominated
Canada	Sonatine		French	Micheline Lanctôt	Not nominated
China	Life	人生	Mandarin	Wu Tianming	Not nominated
Colombia	A Man of Principle	Cóndores no entierran todos los días	Spanish	Francisco Norden	Not nominated
Czechoslovakia	The Millennial Bee	Tisícročná včela	Slovak, Czech	Juraj Jakubisko	Not nominated
Denmark	Tukuma		Danish	Palle Kjærulff-Schmidt	Not nominated
Finland	Pessi and Illusia	Pessi ja Illusia	Finnish	Heikki Partanen	Not nominated
France	So Long, Stooge	Tchao Pantin	French	Claude Berri	Not nominated
West Germany	Man Under Suspicion	Morgen in Alabama	German	Norbert Kückelmann	Not nominated
Hong Kong	Homecoming	似水流年	Cantonese, Mandarin	Yim Ho	Not nominated
Hungary	Yerma		Hungarian	Imre Gyöngyössy and Barna Kabay	Not nominated
Iceland	When the Raven Flies	Hrafninn flýgur	Icelandic	Hrafn Gunnlaugsson	Not nominated
India	The Gist	सारांश	Hindi	Mahesh Bhatt	Not nominated
Israel	Beyond the Walls	מאחורי הסורגים	Hebrew	Uri Barbash	Nominated
Italy	Where's Picone?	Mi manda Picone	Italian	Nanni Loy	Not nominated
Japan	MacArthur's Children	瀬戸内少年野球団	Japanese	Masahiro Shinoda	Not nominated
Netherlands	Army Brats	Schatjes!	Dutch	Ruud van Hemert	Not nominated
Norway	The Chieftain	Høvdingen	Norwegian	Terje Kristiansen	Not nominated
Philippines	Of the Flesh	Karnal	Tagalog, Filipino, English	Marilou Diaz-Abaya	Not nominated
Portugal	Dead Man's Seat	O Lugar do Morto	Portuguese	António-Pedro Vasconcelos	Not nominated
Romania	Glissando		Romanian	Mircea Daneliuc	Not nominated
Soviet Union	Wartime Romance	Военно-полевой роман	Russian	Pyotr Todorovsky	Nominated
South Korea	Mulleya Mulleya	여인잔혹사 물레야 물레야	Korean	Lee Doo-yong	Not nominated
Spain	Double Feature	Sesión continua	Spanish	José Luis Garci	Nominated
Sweden	Åke and His World	Åke och hans värld	Swedish	Allan Edwall	Not nominated
Switzerland	Dangerous Moves	La Diagonale du fou	French	Richard Dembo	Won Academy Award
Taiwan	Old Mao's Second Spring	老莫的第二个春天	Mandarin	You-ning Lee	Not nominated
Thailand	The Story of Nampoo	น้ำพุ	Thai	Euthana Mukdasanit	Not nominated
Venezuela	The House of Water	La casa de agua	Spanish	Jacobo Penzo	Not nominated
Yugoslavia	The End of the War	Kraj Rata	Serbo-Croatian	Dragan Kresoja	Not nominated
