= Just Behind the Door =

1984 film

- Directed by: Mansur Madavi
- Written by: Mansur Madavi
- Starring: Nicola Filippelli
- Cinematography: Mansur Madavi
- Release date: 18 October 1984
- Running time: 90 minutes
- Country: Austria
- Language: German

Just Behind the Door (German: Dicht hinter der Tür) is a 1984 Austrian drama film directed by Mansur Madavi. The film was selected as the Austrian entry for the Best Foreign Language Film at the 57th Academy Awards, but was not accepted as a nominee.

== Cast ==
- Nicola Filippelli as Therapist
- Kurt Kosutic as Visitor
- Irene Kugler as Molly
- Erhard Pauer as Leo
- Karl Schmid-Werter as Questioner
- Alfred Solm as Old man

== See also ==
- List of submissions to the 57th Academy Awards for Best Foreign Language Film
- List of Austrian submissions for the Academy Award for Best Foreign Language Film
