= Dangerous Moves =

1984 Swiss film

- Theatrical release poster
- Directed by: Richard Dembo
- Written by: Richard Dembo
- Produced by: Arthur Cohn; Martine Marignac
- Starring: Michel Piccoli; Alexandre Arbatt; Liv Ullmann
- Cinematography: Raoul Coutard
- Edited by: Agnès Guillemot
- Music by: Gabriel Yared
- Distributed by: Gaumont Distribution
- Release date: 25 April 1984
- Running time: 110 minutes
- Countries: France; Switzerland
- Language: French
- Box office: $2.5 million

Dangerous Moves (French: La Diagonale du fou, "The Fool's Diagonal", referring to the chess piece called the bishop in English but the fool in French) is a 1984 French-language film directed by Richard Dembo and produced by Arthur Cohn. It stars Michel Piccoli, Alexandre Arbatt, as well as Liv Ullmann, Leslie Caron, and Bernhard Wicki in supporting roles. The film was a co-production between companies in France and Switzerland.

== Plot ==
The film tells the story of two very different men competing in the final match of the World Chess Championship. One is a 52-year-old Soviet Jew who holds the title, and the other is a 35-year-old genius who defected to the West several years earlier.

== Cast ==
- Michel Piccoli as Akiva Liebskind
- Alexandre Arbatt as Pavius Fromm
- Liv Ullmann as Marina Fromm
- Leslie Caron as Henia Liebskind
- Wojciech Pszoniak as Felton, Fromm's team
- Jean-Hugues Anglade as Miller, Fromm's team
- Daniel Olbrychski as Tac-Tac, Liebskind's friend
- Hubert Saint-Macary as Foldes
- Michel Aumont as Kerossian, Liebskind's friend
- Pierre Michaël as Yachvili
- Serge Avedikian as Fadenko
- Pierre Vial as Anton Heller
- Bernhard Wicki as Puhl, arbiter
- Jacques Boudet as Stuffli
- Benoît Régent as Barabal

=== Awards ===
Dangerous Moves won the Academy Award for Best Foreign Language Film in 1984; it was submitted by the Swiss government, and gave that nation its first Oscar win. It also won the Louis Delluc Prize, the Prix de l'Académie du Cinéma and the César Award for Best Debut.

== Soundtrack ==
The CD soundtrack, composed by Gabriel Yared, was released on Music Box Records.

== See also ==
- List of submissions to the 57th Academy Awards for Best Foreign Language Film
- List of Swiss submissions for the Academy Award for Best Foreign Language Film
