= Richard Dembo =

French director and screenwriter

- Born: 24 May 1948; Paris, France
- Died: 11 November 2004 (aged 56); Paris, France

Richard Dembo (24 May 1948 – 11 November 2004) was a French director and screenwriter.

Dembo achieved worldwide recognition with his first film: La diagonale du fou, which received an Oscar in 1984 for best foreign film, and also won the César Award for Best First Film for the film. as well as other numerous awards (Prix Louis Delluc). Michel Piccoli starred in the film as a Jewish citizen of the USSR.

In 1993, Dembo directed L'instinct de l'ange with Hélène Vincent, Jean-Louis Trintignant, François Cluzet und Lambert Wilson. After a long pause, during which he directed no films, Dembo directed his last film Nina's House.

On 11 November 2004, Dembo unexpectedly died in Paris under the symptoms of an intestinal obstruction. He was buried in Israel.
