= 22nd Locarno Film Festival =

Film festival in Locarno, Switzerland

- Location: Locarno, Switzerland
- Founded: 1946
- Awards: Golden Leopard: Charles, Dead or Alive, No Path Through Fire; Three Sad Tigers; Those Who Wear Glasses
- Artistic director: Freddy Buache; Sandro Bianconi
- Festival date: Opening: 2 October 1969; Closing: 12 October 1969
- Website: Locarno Film Festival

Locarno Film Festival
- 23rd 21st

The 22nd Locarno Film Festival was held from 2 to 12 October 1969 in Locarno, Switzerland. The festival was highlighted for its continued focus on first and second films from directors and for bringing a bigger audience to the Czech New Wave.

Four Golden Leopards were awarded at the festival, meaning the top prize was shared by four films: Charles, Dead or Alive directed by Alain Tanner, No Path Through Fire directed by Gleb Paniflov, Three Sad Tigers directed by Raúl Ruiz, and Those Who Wear Glasses directed by Sàndor Simò.

== Jury ==
- Istvan Gaal, Hungarian director
- Lue de Huesch, Belgian director
- Ado Kyrou, Greek-French director and critic
- Lucian Pintilie, Romanian director
- Michel Soutter, Swiss director

== Official Sections ==
The following films were screened in these sections:

=== Main Program ===
Main Program / Feature Films In Competition

Original Title	English Title	Director(s)	Year	Production Country
Abschied	Farewell	Egon Günther	1968	Germany
Charles mort ou vif	Charles, Dead or Alive	Alain Tanner	1969	Switzerland
Cuba No Koibito	Cuban Lover	Kazuo Kuroki	1969	Japan, Cuba
Fuori Campo	Out of Frame	Peter Del Monte		Italy
Horoskop	Horoscope	Boro Draskovic	1969	Yugoslavia
I due Kennedy		Gianni Bisiach	1969	Italy
Invasión		Hugo Santiago	1969	Argentina
Jagdszenen Aus Niederbayern	Hunting Scenes from Bavaria	Peter Fleischmann	1969	Germany
L'Arche	The Arch	Cecille, T'ang Shu Shuen	1968	Hong Kong
La femme au couteau	The Woman with the Knife	Timité Bassori	1969	Ivory Coast
Molo	Wharf	Wojciech Solarz	1969	Poland
Natum Pata	Born Pata	Diden Gupta	1969	India
Nejkrasnejsi Vek	The Most Beautiful Age	Jaroslav Paousek	1968	Czech Republic
Nous N'Irons Plus Au Bois	We will No Longer Go to Wood	Georges Dumoulin	1969	France
O Quarto	The Bedroom	Rubem Biafora	1968	Brazil
Otley		Dick Clement	1968	Great Britain
Où Êtes-Vous Donc?	Where Are You Then?	Gilles Croulx	1970	Canada
Pano Ne Passera Pas	Pano Will Not Be Shown	Danielle Jaeggi, Ody Roos	1969	Luxembourg
Paris N'Existe Pas	Paris Does not Exist	Robert Benayoun	1968	France
Gamja	Potato	Soong Ok Kim		South Korea
Ptizi I Hrutki	Birds and Greyhounds	Georgi Stoianov	1969	Bulgaria
Szemüvgesek	Those Who Wear Glasses	Sàndor Simò	1969	Hungary
Tres Tristes Tigres	Three Sad Tigers	Raul Ruiz	1968	Chile
V Ogne Broda Net	No Path Through Fire	Gleb Panfilov	1967	Russia

Main Program / Short Films In Competition

Original Title	English Title	Director(s)	Year	Production Country
22 Fragen An Max Bill	22 Wives and Max Bill	Georg Radanowicz		Switzerland
A Jaula	To Cage	T. Russo		Brazil
A Sekat Dobrotu	And Cut the Goodness	Peter Solan		Czech Republic
A Test Of Violence		Stuart Cooper		Great Britain
Akcelerace	Acceleration	Pavel Prohaska		Czech Republic
Blink		Alison Schwalm		Great Britain
Carski Dan	Imperial Day	Mlutin Kosovac		Yugoslavia
Clovnul	Clown	Virgil Monacu		Romania
Couronne D'Epines	Epine Crown	Nabil Maleh		Syria
Ein Theater Der Neuen Zeit	A Theater of the New Time	Theo Gallehr		Germany
Explorer		P. Pati		India
Eyes		Ehrahim Vahidzadeh		Iran
Fantasmatic		Gisèle Ansorge, Ernest Ansorge		Switzerland
Film Des Morts Sourissiens	Sourissian Dead Film	Eva Lurati		France
Fotografovanie Obyvaetelov Domu	Photographing the Inhabitants of the House	Dusan Trancik		Czech Republic
Free To Do What		Bart Phillips		Great Britain
Gdanska Sztuka Kuznicka	Gdanska Kuznicka Art	Jadwiga Zukowska		Poland
Izvor Zivota	Source of Life	Nikola Najdak, Borislav Saitinac		Czech Republic
Le Petit Chaperon Rouge Et La Bombe A Retardement	The Little Red Riding Hood and the Bomb Has Delayed	Guido Henderickx		Belgium
Les Bonnes Soirees De Madame	Madame's Good Evenings	Bernard Gesbert		France
Most		Midhat Mutadpic		Yugoslavia
Oops!		Derel Phillips		Great Britain
Pehacik V Zooe	Pehacik in the Zoo	Garik Seko		Czech Republic
Resonant		Richard M. Shirley		USA
Round Trip		Ahmed Marey		United Arab Emirates
San Francisco		Anthony Stern		Great Britain
Solo		Misha Donat		Great Britain
Spirale	Spiral	Gérard Samson		France
Stefano Junior		Maurizio Ponzi		Italy
The Locker		Barry Tomblin		Great Britain

=== Out of Competition (Fuori Concorso) ===
Main Program / Feature Films Out of Competition

Original Title	English Title	Director(s)	Year	Production Country
Feldobott Kö	Tossed Circle	Sandor Sara	1969	Hungary
Lucia		Humberto Solas	1968	Cuba
Zert	Cert	Jaromil Jires	1969	Czech Republic

Main Program / Short Films Out of Competition

Original Title	English Title	Director(s)	Year	Production Country
A Nap'Es A Hold Erlablasa		Sándor Reisenbüchler		Hungary
Dragam		Gabor Kenyeres		Hungary
Man And His World		Michael Collyer, Albert Fischer		USA
U Kafani	In a Cafe	Vetik Hadzismajlovic		Yugoslavia
Une Bombe Par Hasard	One Bomb by Chance	Jean-François Laguionie		France

=== Special Sections - Swiss Information ===
Swiss Information - Short and Medium-length Films
Original Title	English Title	Director(s)	Year	Production Country
Im Schönsten Wiesengrunde	In the Most Beautiful Meadow Group	Peter von Gunten		Switzerland
Le Souvenir	The Memory	Jacques Sandoz		Switzerland
Lea		Samuel Müry		Switzerland
Lydia		Reto-Andrea Savoldelli		Switzerland
Metro		Hans Stürm		Switzerland
Mondo Karies	World Karies	Kurt Gloor		Switzerland
Nach Rio	To Rio	Clemens Klopfenstein		Switzerland
Swiss Information - Feature Films
La Pomme	The Apple	Michel Soutter	1969	Switzerland
Swiss Made 1. 1980 - Celui Qui Dit Non	Swiss Made 1. 1980 - The One Who Says No	Yves Yersin		Switzerland
Swiss Made 2. Alarm		Fritz E. Maeder		Switzerland
Swiss Made 3. 2069 Oder Dort, Wo Sich Futurologen Und Archaeologen Gutenacht Sagen	Swiss Made 3. 2069 or where Futurologists and Archaeologists Say Good Night	Fredi M. Murer		Switzerland
Vive La Mort	Long Live Death	Francis Reusser	1969	Switzerland
Yvon Yvonne		Claude Champion		Switzerland

=== Tribute To Luchino Visconti ===
Tribute To Luchino Visconti
Original Title	English Title	Director(s)	Year	Production Country
Bellissima		Luchino Visconti	1951	Italy
Boccaccio 70		Luchino Visconti	1962	Italy
Giorni Di Gloria	Days of Glory	Giuseppe De Santis, Mario Serandrei	1945	Italy
Il gattopardo	The Leopard	Luchino Visconti	1963	Italy
La terra trema	The Earth Will Tremble	Luchino Visconti	1948	Italy
Le notti bianche	White Nights	Luchino Visconti	1957	Italy
Le streghe	The Witches	Luchino Visconti	1967	Italy
Lo straniero	The Stranger	Luchino Visconti	1967	Italy
Ossessione		Luchino Visconti	1942	Italy
Rocco e i suoi fratelli	Rocco and His Brothers	Luchino Visconti	1960	Italy
Senso	Senso or The Wanton Countess	Luchino Visconti	1954	Italy
Siamo donne	We, the Women	Luchino Visconti	1953	Italy
Vaghe stelle dell'Orsa	Sandra	Luchino Visconti	1965	Italy

== Official Awards ==
=== International Jury ===
- Golden Leopard unanimously, feature films: CHARLES, DEAD OR ALIVE by Alain Tanner
- Golden Leopard by majority, feature films: NO PATH THROUGH FIRE by Gleb Paniflov, THREE SAD TIGERS by Raúl Ruiz, THOSE WHO WEAR GLASSES by Sàndor Simò

Majority's International Jury Mention, feature films: PARIS N’EXISTE PAS by Robert Benayoun, INVASIÓN by Hugo Santiago

- Best animation film prize, short films: IZVOR ZIVOTA by Nikola Najdak and Borislav Saitinac,FANTASMATIC by Gisèle Ansorge and Ernest Ansorge
- Best documentary film prize, short films: MOST by Midhat Mutadpic

=== Youth Jury ===
- Youth Jury Award, feature films: CHARLES, DEAD OR ALIVE by Alain Tanner, JAGDSZENEN AUS NIEDERBAYERN by Peter Fleischmann
- Youth Jury Award, short films: IZVOR ZIVOTA by Nikola Najdak and Borislav Saitinac, RESONANT by Richard M. Shirley, SAN FRANCISCO by Anthony Stern, STEFANO JUNIOR by Maurizio Ponzi

=== International Cinema Encounters of Sorrento Jury ===
- Golden Cameo: LA POMME by Michel Soutter, No Path Through Fire by Gleb Panfilov
