= Cultural representations of the Hungarian Revolution of 1956 =

Although the Hungarian Revolution of 1956 failed in its efforts to oust the ruling Communist government of Hungary, the uprising provided inspiration for many artists, writers, poets, composers and filmmakers.

== Film ==
Many movies and documentaries have been made about the revolution. They include:

- The Forgotten Faces (1961), a short directed by Peter Watkins, filmed on the streets of Canterbury, England, which re-creates events from the revolution to great realistic effect.
- Szerelem (1971), directed by Károly Makk, which tells the story of an old woman and her daughter-in-law, and the effects on them of their son/husband's imprisonment during the revolution and of his return home from prison.
- Daniel Takes a Train (1983), film directed by Pál Sándor set at the time of the revolution.
- Sunshine (1999) by István Szabó covers the 1956 Revolution among other historical periods in Hungary.
- Réka Pigniczky's 2006 film Journey Home (Hazatérés), which tells the story of two sisters who try to find out what their father did as a freedom fighter during the Hungarian revolution of 1956. The story unfolds as the women take their father’s ashes from the U.S. to Hungary to fulfill his dying request to be buried in his native land.

A number films have also dealt with the famous Hungary-USSR water polo match at the 1956 Olympics, including Freedom's Fury, produced by Quentin Tarantino.

- Szabadság, szerelem (Children of Glory) A 2006 semi-fictional film by Hungarian director Kriszta Goda, depicting the effect of the 1956 Revolution on members of the 1956 Hungarian Olympic water polo team. A few weeks after Revolution was crushed, the Hungarian players find themselves up against the Soviet Union at a semifinal match.

== Music ==
Dmitri Shostakovich's Eleventh Symphony, written in 1957, although subtitled "The Year 1905" and purporting to be a musical description of the ill-fated democratic uprising in Russia in that year, is often considered a commentary on the events in Hungary. Shostakovich makes frequent use of early 20th-century Russian revolutionary songs about the cruelty of the Tsar and the longing for freedom, and vividly depicts the violent crushing of the 1905 revolution. To Soviet audiences of the time, the analogy with the Hungarian revolution was unmistakable.

"Avanti ragazzi di Buda" was published on 1966 by Pier Francesco Pingitore. It is a popular Italian song commemorating the events on the Hungarian Revolution of 1956, being known in Hungary as Előre budai srácok.

Chess, a musical by Benny Andersson and Björn Ulvaeus, with lyrics by Ulvaeus and Tim Rice, and book by Rice, references the uprising with the song "1956 - Budapest Is Rising".

== Literature ==
James Michener wrote the novel The Bridge at Andau while living in Austria during the period of the Hungarian Revolution of 1956. He witnessed the wave of refugees who fled Hungary in November 1956 after the Soviet invasion and the arrests that followed. The book, one of Michener’s earliest works, describes the events before and after the uprising, based upon interviews with eyewitnesses, but characters' names are fictional to protect them and their families left in Hungary.

In opposition to the successful works of those who sided with the Hungarian revolutionists, literature aimed at shifting the agenda of the initial revolution persisted as well. Within Hungarian society, the central Hungarian communist daily, Népszabadság, portrayed the event as a "counterrevolution." The three decades of coverage, from November 11, 1956 to November 11, 1986, worked to transcribe the revolt as violent, internationally pre-planned, and driven by criminals. By reshaping the identity of the Hungarian Revolution, the local government was made to appear legitimate and pure within the intentions of returning to communist political framework in Hungary.
