= Hosszúaszó =

Hosszúaszó is the Hungarian name for two villages in Romania:

- Valea Lungă Commune, Alba County
- Hosasău village, Leliceni Commune, Harghita County
