= Sunshine (1999 film) =

1999 film by István Szabó

- American theatrical release poster
- Directed by: István Szabó
- Written by: Israel Horovitz; István Szabó
- Produced by: András Hámori; Robert Lantos
- Starring: Ralph Fiennes; Rosemary Harris; Rachel Weisz; Jennifer Ehle; Deborah Kara Unger; Molly Parker; James Frain; John Neville; Miriam Margolyes; William Hurt
- Cinematography: Lajos Koltai
- Edited by: Michel Arcand; Dominique Fortin
- Music by: Maurice Jarre
- Production companies: Alliance Atlantis; Bavaria Film and TV Fund; Channel Four Films; Eurimages; Filmfonds Wien; InterCom; Kinowelt Filmproduktion; The Movie Network; TV2; Téléfilm Canada; Österreichischer Rundfunk
- Distributed by: Kinowelt Filmverleih (Germany); InterCom (Hungary); Alliance Atlantis Releasing (Canada)
- Release dates: 13 September 1999 (TIFF); 27 January 2000 (Hungary)
- Running time: 180 minutes
- Countries: Germany; Austria; Hungary; Canada
- Languages: English; French
- Budget: $26 million
- Box office: $7.6 million

Sunshine is a 1999 epic historical drama film directed by István Szabó and written by Israel Horovitz and Szabó. It follows five generations of a Hungarian Jewish family, originally named Sonnenschein (German: "sunshine"), later changed to Sors (Hungarian: "fate"), during changes in Hungary, focusing mostly on the three generations from the late 19th century through the mid-20th century. The family story traverses the creation of the Austro-Hungarian Empire through to the period after the 1956 Revolution, while the characters are forced to surrender much of their identity and endure family conflict. The central male protagonist of all three generations is portrayed by Ralph Fiennes. The film's stars include Rachel Weisz and John Neville, with the real-life daughter and mother team of Jennifer Ehle and Rosemary Harris playing the same character across a six-decade storyline.

The film was an international co-production among companies from Germany, Austria, Hungary, and Canada. It won three European Film Awards, including Best Actor for Fiennes, and three Canadian Genie Awards, including Best Motion Picture.

== Plot ==
The mid-19th-century patriarch of the Hungarian-Jewish Sonnenschein (meaning "Sunshine" in German) family is a tavern owner who makes his own popular distilled herb-based tonic in Austria-Hungary. The tonic, called Taste of Sunshine, is later commercially made by his son, Emmanuel, bringing the family great wealth and prestige. He builds a large estate where his oldest son, Ignatz, falls in love with his first cousin, Valerie, despite the disapproval of Emmanuel and Rose, his wife. Ignatz, while studying in law school, begins an affair with Valerie. Ignatz graduates and later earns a place as a respected district judge, when he is asked by the chief judge to change his Jewish surname to a Hungarian one in order to be promoted to the central court. The entire generation – Ignatz, his physician brother Gustave and photographer cousin Valerie – change their last name to Sors (meaning "fate" in Hungarian). Ignatz then gets promoted when he tells the Minister of Justice a way to delay the prosecution of corrupt politicians.

In the spring of 1899, when Valerie becomes pregnant, she and Ignatz happily marry before the birth of their son, Istvan. Their second son, Adam, is born in 1902. Ignatz continues to support the Habsburg monarchy, while Gustave pushes for a communist revolution. Both brothers become officers in the Austro-Hungarian Army during World War I. Emmanuel dies on the same day as the Emperor Franz Joseph I. In the days after the war, Valerie briefly leaves him for another man, the old monarchy collapses, and Ignatz loses his judicial position under a series of short-lived socialist and communist regimes in which Gustave is involved. When a new monarchy emerges and asks Ignatz to oversee trials of retribution against the communists, he declines and is forced to retire. His health deteriorates rapidly and he dies, leaving Valerie as the head of the family.

Istvan and Adam both join the Jewish-run Civic Fencing Club. Adam becomes the best fencer in Hungary, and General Jakofalvy invites him to convert to Roman Catholicism in order to join the nation's top military, non-Jewish, fencing club. While Adam and Istvan are converting, Adam meets Hannah, who is converting at the request of her fiancé and woos her into marrying him. Adam wins the national fencing championship two years in a row and goes on to lead the national team to the 1936 Olympic gold medal in Team Sabre in Nazi Germany, becoming a national hero in Hungary. Istvan's wife, Greta, pursues Adam until they start a secret affair.

New Hungarian laws are passed discriminating against people with any near Jewish ancestors, and the Sors family is initially shielded by the exceptions in the laws. However, Adam is soon expelled from the military fencing club. Greta finally convinces the family that they must emigrate to save their children, but they are too late to get exit visas.

When Germany occupies Hungary, Valerie and Hannah are immediately moved into the Budapest Ghetto. Valerie escapes and hides in a friend's attic, but nobody knows how or where Hannah died. Adam and his son Ivan are sent to a labor camp, where Adam is beaten, stripped naked, and hosed with water until he freezes to death. Istvan, Greta, and their son are summarily shot by Nazis.

After the war, the surviving Sors family returns to the Sonnenschein estate. The elderly Gustave returns from exile and is invited into the communist government, Valerie manages the household, and Ivan becomes a state policeman, working for police Major General Knorr and rounding up fascists from the wartime regime. Ivan rises quickly in the communist ranks and begins an affair with Carole, the wife of a high-ranking communist official. Later, Army General Kope asks Ivan to start vigorously arresting Jews, including Knorr, who are suspected of inciting conspiracies against the current government. After Gustave dies, Kope informs Ivan that his uncle would have been next to be investigated.

When Stalin dies in 1953, Ivan feels guilty for helping Kope and not saving Knorr. He leaves the police force and swears to fight the communist regime. In the Hungarian Revolution of 1956, he steps up as a leader but is imprisoned after it fails. Released at the end of the decade, he returns to live together with Valerie in a single room of the former family estate. She falls ill while they search for the tonic recipe. After she dies, he continues the search but accidentally disposes of the book while cleaning out the apartment.

While searching, he uncovers an old letter written by Emanuel to Ignatz telling him never to make being accepted by others his main goal in life. Inspired, Ivan goes to the legal office to change his name from Sors to Sonnenschein. He concludes his storytelling after the end of the communist regime in 1989. While walking down the street afterward, he feels free for the first time in his life.

== Cast ==
- Ralph Fiennes as Ignatz Sonnenschein (Sors) / Adam Sors / Ivan Sors
- Rosemary Harris as senior Valerie Sors
- Rachel Weisz as Greta Sors
- Jennifer Ehle as younger Valerie Sonnenschein (Sors)
- Deborah Kara Unger as Maj. Carole Kovács
- Molly Parker as Hannah Wippler (Sors)
- James Frain as younger Gustave Sonnenschein (Sors)
- David de Keyser as Emanuel Sonnenschein
- John Neville as senior Gustave Sors
- Miriam Margolyes as Rose Sonnenschein
- Rudiger Vogler as General Jakofalvy
- Mark Strong as István Sors
- Bill Paterson as Minister of Justice
- Trevor Peacock as Comrade Gen. Kope
- Hanns Zischler as Baron Margitta
- William Hurt as Andor Knorr
- Mari Törőcsik as Older Kató
- Péter Halász as Wild Duck
- Péter Andorai as Anselmi
- Flóra Kádár as Mrs. Hackl
- Attila Lőte as Count Forgach
- Sándor Simó as Doctor
- Zoltán Gera as Man at Synagogue
- András Stohl as Red Guard
- Gábor Mádi Szabó as Priest at Conversion
- László Gálffi as Rossa
- Eszter Ónodi as Secretary at Officer's Club
- Ádám Rajhona as Caretaker
- János Kulka as Molnár
- Lajos Kovács as MP in Camp
- Gábor Máté as Rosner
- György Kézdy as Outraged Man
- Frigyes Hollósi as Mr. Ledniczky

== Themes ==
Psychologist Diana Diamond identified themes in the film as "Trauma, familial and historical", and how it has lasting effects on the individual's psychology. The character Ivan's status as narrator reflects this theme, as he witnesses Adam's death in the concentration camp. In exploring the relationship between Ignatz, Valerie and their brother Gustave and alleged adultery, the film portrays "Oedipal rivalries" and incest. Author Christian Schmitt adds Sunshine may also strive to add a message of hope to the tragedies of history.

Professor Dragon Zoltan writes the film starts by contrasting the title Sunshine with clouds as a backdrop, to communicate a force standing in the way of the sunshine. He argues the name of the family's brand, Taste of Sunshine, which is also the literal translation of the film's Hungarian title, suggests that the family's happiness stays with those who have tasted it, even after it is finished. The name Sonnenschein is also said in the film to underline the family's Jewish background, while Sors (fate) maintains the first two letters while erasing the Jewish traces. Ivan becomes a Sonnenschein again after reading a letter telling him how to live, representing the lost recipe of the family brand.

== Production ==
=== Development ===
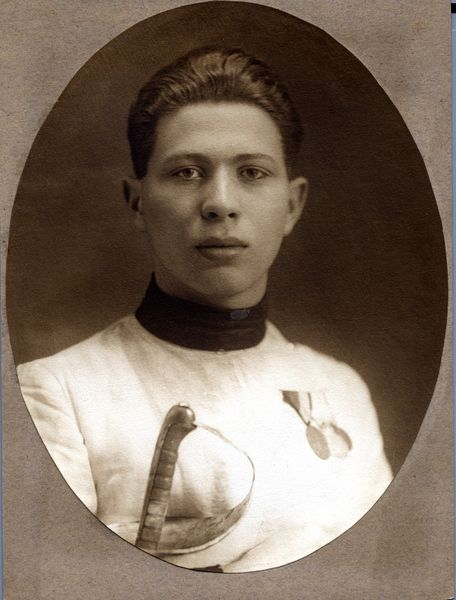
Olympian Attila Petschauer was an inspiration to the film.

Although the story is a work of fiction, the film draws inspiration from historic events. The Sonnenschein family's liquor business was based on the Zwack family's liquor brand Unicum. One of Fiennes's three roles is based at least partly on Hungarian Olympian Attila Petschauer. Another role in the film which is similar to that of a historic person is the character Andor Knorr, played by William Hurt, which closely resembles the latter part of the life of László Rajk. Sonnenschein itself was a name in director István Szabó's family.

Hungarian-born Canadian producer Robert Lantos aspired to help make a film reflecting his family background of Hungarian Jews. Sunshine was his first project after leaving the position of CEO in Alliance Films.

Szabó shared his idea for the story with Lantos, a friend, in a restaurant, and Lantos was interested. Szabó submitted a screenplay of 400 pages in Hungarian, with Lantos persuading him to condense it and translate to English. The budget was $26 million.

=== Filming ===
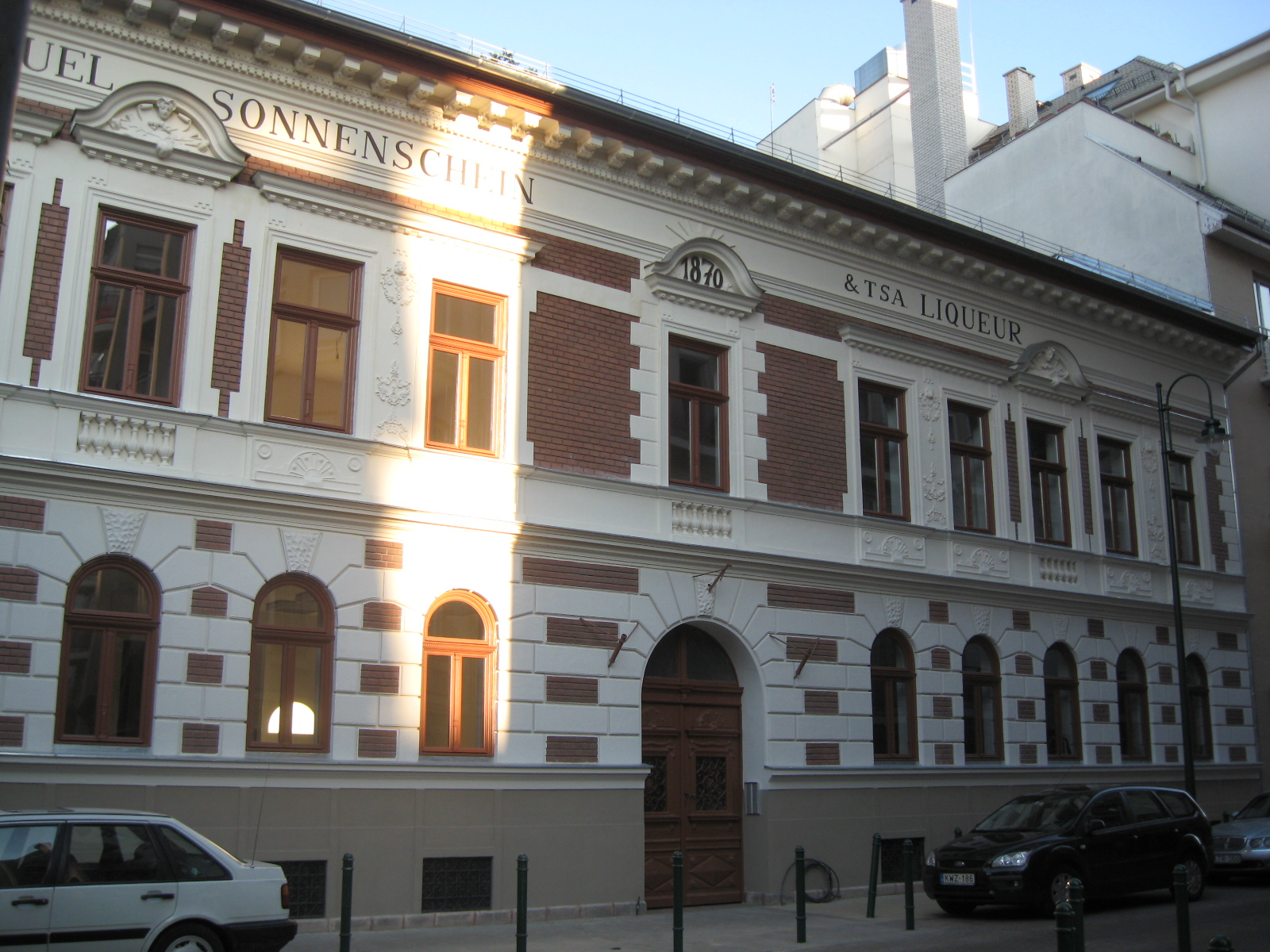
Apartment building still bearing the film's markings of the fictional 1870 Sonnenschein mansion and distillery, at 15 Bokréta Street, in Budapest's central Ferencváros district (2008).

Shooting took place mainly in Budapest. The Berlin Olympics scene was shot in Budapest and required 1,000 extras. The exterior of the Budapest estate of the Sonnenschein family, with a large mansion and distillery, was filmed at an apartment building at 15 Bokréta Street (Bokréta utca 15), in the city's central Ferencváros district. The filmmakers painted a sign near the top of the building's façade to identify it, for purposes of the story, as belonging to "Emmanuel Sonnenschein & tsa. Liquer" (where tsa. translates to co., for Company). In July 2008, director Szabó and cinematographer Koltai were on hand as invited guests for the grand re-opening of the apartment complex, as the municipal and district governments chose to maintain the fictional company name on the façade and officially name it The Sonnenschein House, after the governments spent 300 million forints renovating the building. Interior shots of the family mansion were filmed at a nearby building, on Liliom Street.

Fiennes described Szabó as very specific in how scenes were staged and how performances were given. On some shooting days, Fiennes would play all three of his characters, particularly if a specific location was only available for a limited time.

== Release ==
The film premiered in the Toronto International Film Festival in September 1999. Alliance Atlantis distributed the film in Canada. It opened in Vancouver, Toronto and Montreal from 17 to 19 December 1999.

This was followed by a release in Munich and Budapest in mid-January 2000, with a wider release in Germany, Austria and Hungary later that month. In February 2000, it was showcased in the 31st Hungarian Film Week, held in Budapest, where it won the Gene Moskowitz Best Film award. After U.S. screenings in summer 2000, Paramount Classics re-released it in New York City and Los Angeles on 1 December to promote Sunshine for the Academy Awards.

== Reception ==
=== Box office ===
On the opening weekend in the Canadian limited release, the film made $42,700. In its first 19 days, the film grossed $300,000 in Canada, with expectations that if the film made a profit, it would be due to international screenings, TV rights and VHS and DVD.

By 25 November 2000, it had made $1 million in Canadian theatres. The film finished its run after grossing $5,096,267 in North America. It made $2,511,593 in other territories, for a worldwide total of $7,607,860.

=== Critical reception ===
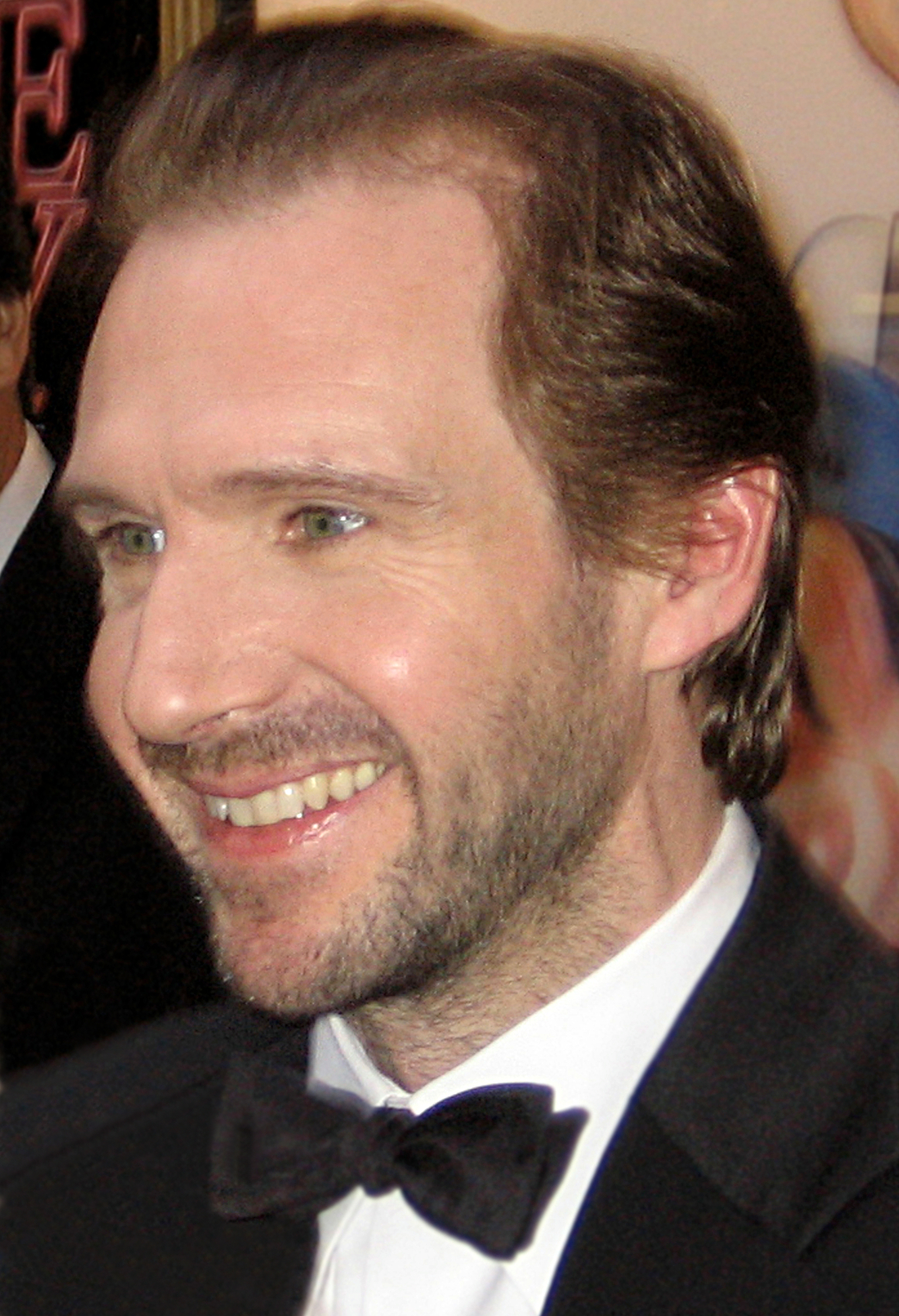
Ralph Fiennes received positive reviews for his performance of three characters.

Sunshine has a 74% approval rating and average rating of 7.2 out of 10, based on 65 reviews, on Rotten Tomatoes. Metacritic, which uses a weighted average, assigned the film a score of 71 out of 100, based on 26 critics, indicating "generally favorable" reviews. Roger Ebert gave Sunshine three stars, calling it "a movie of substance and thrilling historical sweep". In Time, Richard Schickel remarked on the irony of the title in a film that conveyed how history devastates people. National Review's John Simon praised Szabó's direction, Lajos Koltai's cinematography and especially the performances of Ralph Fiennes and the supporting cast. In The New Republic, Stanley Kauffmann compared Szabó favorably to David Lean in a cinematic treatment of history, and despite the long runtime, "Sunshine is so sumptuous, the actors so refresh the very idea of good acting, that we are left grateful".

In The New York Times, A.O. Scott assessed the film as occasionally awkward, but wrote it made the viewer think. Michael Wilmington of The Chicago Tribune gave the film three and a half stars, praising it for its aesthetic photography and defending Fiennes for "deep understanding, burning intensity and rich contrast". Mick LaSalle called Sunshine "glorious", Fiennes "superb", and also praised Weisz, Ehle and Hurt. Time later placed it in its top 10 films of 2000.

Eddie Cockrell criticized the film in Variety for a "general rushed feel of the proceedings" in covering a great deal of history. The Guardian critic Andrew Pulver wrote Sunshine depended on Fiennes, who "only partly succeeds", negatively reviewing Fiennes' performances as Ignatz and Ivan.

=== Accolades ===
Sunshine received 14 nominations at the 20th Genie Awards, following the Academy of Canadian Cinema and Television's decision to revise rules allowing films with only a minority of Canadian involvement in production to compete, which also allowed Felicia's Journey to be nominated for 10.

Award	Date of ceremony	Category	Recipient(s)	Result	Ref(s)
European Film Awards	4 December 1999	Best Film	Andras Hamori and Robert Lantos	Nominated	
European Film Awards	4 December 1999	Best Actor	Ralph Fiennes	Won	
European Film Awards	4 December 1999	Best Screenwriter	István Szabó and Israel Horovitz	Won	
European Film Awards	4 December 1999	Best Cinematographer	Lajos Koltai	Won	
Genie Awards	January 2000	Best Motion Picture	Andras Hamori and Robert Lantos	Won	
Genie Awards	January 2000	Best Direction	István Szabó	Nominated	
Genie Awards	January 2000	Best Actor	Ralph Fiennes	Nominated	
Genie Awards	January 2000	Best Actress	Rosemary Harris	Nominated	
Genie Awards	January 2000	Best Actress	Jennifer Ehle	Nominated	
Genie Awards	January 2000	Best Supporting Actor	James Frain	Nominated	
Genie Awards	January 2000	Best Supporting Actor	William Hurt	Nominated	
Genie Awards	January 2000	Best Supporting Actress	Deborah Kara Unger	Nominated	
Genie Awards	January 2000	Best Supporting Actress	Rachel Weisz	Nominated	
Genie Awards	January 2000	Best Art Direction/Production Design	Attila Kovács	Nominated	
Genie Awards	January 2000	Best Costume Design	Györgyi Szakács	Nominated	
Genie Awards	January 2000	Best Score	Maurice Jarre	Nominated	
Genie Awards	January 2000	Best Sound	Daniel Pellerin, Keith Elliott, Glen Gauthier and Peter Kelly	Won	
Genie Awards	January 2000	Best Sound Editing	Jane Tattersall, Fred Brennan, Dina Eaton, Andy Malcolm and David McCallum	Won	
Golden Globes	21 January 2001	Best Motion Picture – Drama	Sunshine	Nominated	
Golden Globes	21 January 2001	Best Director	István Szabó	Nominated	
Golden Globes	21 January 2001	Best Original Score	Maurice Jarre	Nominated	
National Board of Review	6 December 2000	Top Ten Films	Sunshine	Won	
Political Film Society	2000	Democracy Award	Sunshine	Won	
Political Film Society	2000	Human Rights Award	Sunshine	Nominated	
Satellite Awards	14 January 2001	Best Supporting Actress – Motion Picture	Jennifer Ehle and Rosemary Harris	Won	
Writers Guild of Canada	April 2000	WGC Award	István Szabó and Israel Horovitz	Won	

== See also ==
- List of Holocaust films
- Cultural representations of the Hungarian Revolution of 1956
