= A Long Weekend in Pest and Buda =

2003 film

- Film poster
- Directed by: Károly Makk
- Written by: Marc Vlessing; Károly Makk
- Produced by: András Böhm
- Starring: Mari Törőcsik
- Cinematography: Elemér Ragályi
- Release dates: 24 June 2003 (Moscow); 13 November 2003 (Hungary)
- Running time: 90 minutes
- Country: Hungary
- Language: Hungarian

A Long Weekend in Pest and Buda (Hungarian: Egy hét Pesten és Budán) is a 2003 Hungarian drama film directed by Károly Makk. It was entered into the 25th Moscow International Film Festival.

== Cast ==
- Mari Törőcsik as Török Mari
- Iván Darvas as Drégely Iván
- Eszter Nagy-Kálózy as Török Anna
- Dezső Garas as Pozsár Pál
- Eileen Atkins as Amanda
- Attila Kaszás as Robi
- Emese Vasvári as Nõvér
- Zoltán Seress as Orvos
- Zsuzsa Nyertes as Zsuzsika
- Géza Pártos as Professzor
- Zoltán Gera as Szállodaportás
- Tamás Andor as Csapos
- Imre Csuja as Falusi ember
- János Derzsi as Taxisofõr
