= Irma Patkós =

Hungarian actress (1900–1996)

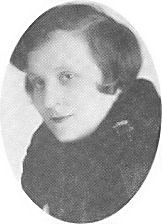
- Patkós, c. 1930
- Born: 8 March 1900; Cegléd, Austria-Hungary (now Hungary)
- Died: 24 October 1996 (aged 96); Cegléd, Hungary
- Occupation: Actress
- Years active: 1957–1994

Irma Patkós (8 March 1900 – 24 October 1996) was a Hungarian film actress. She appeared in 40 films between 1957 and 1994.

== Selected filmography ==
- A Strange Role (1976)
- My Father's Happy Years (1977)
- Cserepek (1980)
- Sweet Emma, Dear Böbe (1992)
