= Loránd Lohinszky =

Romanian artist and university professor

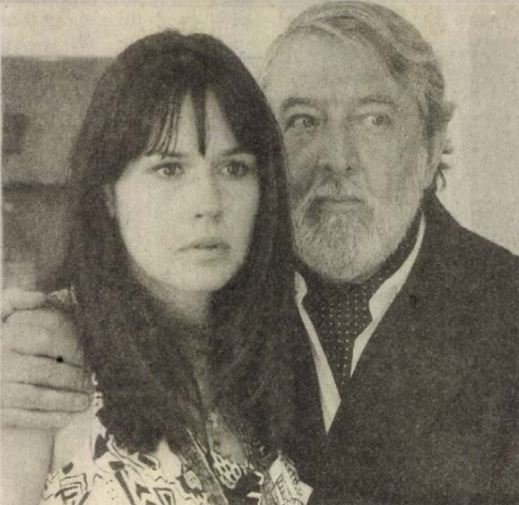
Catherine Wilkening (left) & Lóránd Lohinszky (right)

Loránd Rudolf Lohinszky (Hungarian pronunciation: [ˈloraːnd ˈrudolf ˈlohinski]; 25 July 1924 – 22 June 2013) was a Romanian Merited Artist and university professor of Hungarian ethnicity.

== Personal life ==
Lohinszky was born in Cluj. From 1954 until his death, he was professor at the University of Arts from Târgu Mureș. In 1957 he married actress Ibolya Farkas. Their child, Júlia Lohinszky, was born in 1958.

He died on 22 June 2013 in Târgu Mureș, after a short illness. The burial took place on 26 June 2013 in graveyard of the city's reformed church.

== Awards, prizes ==
- Merited artist of Romania (1964)
- The Award of the "Magyar Művészetért Alapítvány" (1995)
- The "Magyar Köztársasági Érdemrend tisztikeresztje" (1995)
- Order of the Star of Romania, Officer rank (2000)
- Uniter Lifetime Achievement Award (2000)
- Honorary Doctor of the I. L. Caragiale National University of Theatre and Film, in Bucharest (2005)

== Principal roles played in theatre ==
- Ernő Szép: Lila ákác
- Ion Luca Caragiale: O scrisoare pierdută
- Romulus Guga: Egy öngyilkos világa – Ignațiu
- Levente Kovács: Az emlékek kávéháza
- George Bernard Shaw: Mrs. Warren's Profession – Praed
- Mikhail Bulgakov: A divatszalon titka
- Jean Racine: Phèdre – Thésée
- Aleksei Arbuzov: Régimódi komédia
- Levente Kovács: Mi van a padláson
- Maxim Gorky: The Lower Depths – Luka
- János Székely: Irgalmas hazugság – Dr. Bálint Ákos
- William Somerset Maugham: Színház – Michael Gosselyn
- Kincses Elemér: Maraton – Első koldus
- András Sütő: Az álomkommandó – Manó
- Gábor Vaszary: Az ördög nem alszik – Gróf Boroghy Gedeon
- William Shakespeare: Romeo and Juliet – Lőrinc
- Edward Albee: Who's Afraid of Virginia Woolf? – George
- Friedrich Dürrenmatt: The Visit – Ill
- Péter Bornemisza: Magyar Elektra – Meșter
- Pál Békés: New Buda – Pulszky Ferenc
- Anton Chekhov: The Seagull – Trepljov
- Jenő Heltai: A néma levente – Beppo
- Anton Chekhov: Three Sisters (play) – Kuligin
- Gyula Illyés: Fáklyaláng – Görgey
- Carlo Goldoni: Különös történet – Filiberto
- William Shakespeare: King Lear – King Lear
- József Katona: Bánk bán – Biberach
- András Sütő: Vidám sirató egy bolyongó porszemért – Prédikás
- István Nagy: Özönvíz előtt – Darkó
- Anton Chekhov: Platonov (play) – Platonov
- András Sütő: Csillag a máglyán – Kálvin; Szervét
- László Németh: A két Bolyai – Farkas Bolyai
- István Örkény: Tóték (The Tóth Family) – Őrnagy
- Friedrich Schiller: Don Carlos (play) – II. Fülöp
- Gyula Krúdy – Kapás Dezső: A vörös postakocsi – Eduárd Alvinczy
- Imre Madách: The Tragedy of Man – Lucifer

== Filmography ==
- Egy hétköznapi történet (1957)
- Nincs idő (1973)
- Holnap lesz fácán (1974)
- Álmodó ifjúság (1974)
- A szegények kapitánya (1976)
- My Father's Happy Years (1977)
- Naplemente délben (1979)
- Kereszt és láng (1979)
- Ítélet után (1979)
- Naplemente délben (1980)
- Anna (1981)
- Vörös vurstli (1991)
- A három nővér (1991)
- Köd (1994)
- Ábel a rengetegben (1994)
- Csendélet (1994)
- New Buda (1995)
- Retúr (1996)
- A nagy fejedelem (1997)
- In memoriam Mándy Iván (1998)
- Színészfejedelem (1998)
- Pejkó (2003)
