= Pál Sándor =

Hungarian film director (born 1939)

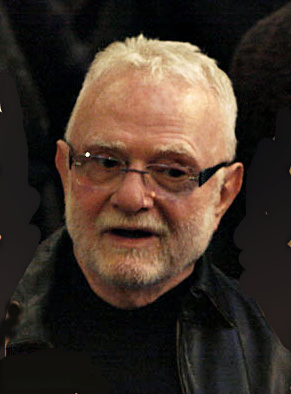
- Born: 19 October 1939 (age 86); Budapest, Hungary
- Occupations: Film director Film producer Screenwriter
- Years active: 1964-present

Pál Sándor (born 19 October 1939) is a Hungarian film director, producer, and screenwriter. He has directed 28 films since 1964. His 1976 film A Strange Role was entered into the 27th Berlin International Film Festival, where it won the Silver Bear. His 1983 film Szerencsés Dániel won a FIPRESCI award at the Cannes Film Festival.

== Selected filmography ==
- Football of the Good Old Days (1973)
- A Strange Role (1976)
- Szerencsés Dániel (1983)
- Miss Arizona (1987)
- Daughter of Darkness (1990)
