= The Pregnant Papa =

- Directed by: Dezső Garas
- Starring: Ferenc Kállai; Károly Eperjes
- Release date: 3 August 1989
- Running time: 1h 20min
- Country: Hungary
- Language: Hungarian

The Pregnant Papa (Hungarian: A legényanya) is a 1989 Hungarian comedy film directed by Dezső Garas.

== Cast ==
- Ferenc Kállai - Béla, the president of the council
- Károly Eperjes - Józsi
- Judit Pogány - Rozi, Józsi's mom
- Dezső Garas - Béla, Józsi's dad
- Ervin Kibédi - Béla, the director
- József Horváth - Béla, the priest
- Enikő Eszenyi - Ágika
- Péter Andorai - Béla, the doctor
- Ádám Szirtes - Old peasant
