= Attila Lőte =

Hungarian film, stage and television actor (1934–2026)

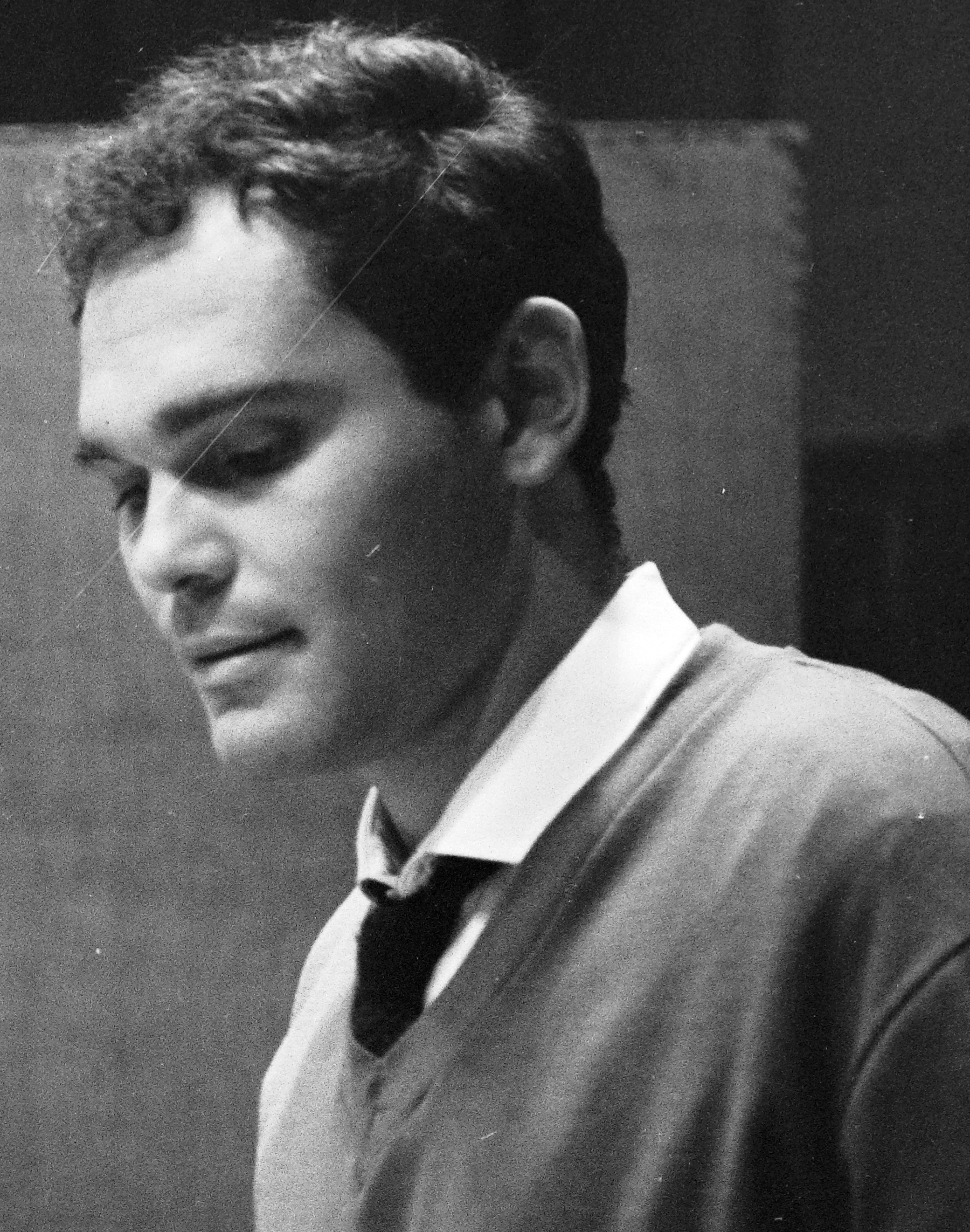
- Lőte in 1962
- Born: 13 June 1934; Szeged, Hungary
- Died: 15 March 2026 (aged 91)
- Education: University of Theatre and Film Arts in Budapest
- Occupation: Actor
- Years active: 1959–2023

Attila Lőte (13 June 1934 – 15 March 2026) was a Hungarian film, stage and television actor. A recipient of the Jászai Mari Award, he appeared in over 70 films and television programs between 1959 to 2023, and was best known for playing Count Forgach in the 1999 film Sunshine.

Lőte died on 15 March 2026, at the age of 91.
