= Miss Arizona (1988 film) =

1988 film

- Theatrical release poster by Renato Casaro
- Directed by: Pál Sándor
- Written by: Alfredo Gionotti
- Produced by: Jacopo Capanna
- Starring: Marcello Mastroianni; Hanna Schygulla; Alessandra Martines
- Cinematography: Elemér Ragályi
- Edited by: Nino Baragli
- Music by: Armando Trovajoli
- Release date: 1988
- Running time: 95 minutes
- Country: Hungary
- Language: Hungarian

Miss Arizona is a 1988 Hungarian drama film directed by Pál Sándor.

== Cast ==
- Marcello Mastroianni as Sandor Rozsnyai
- Hanna Schygulla as Mitzi Stein
- Alessandra Martines as Marta
- Urbano Barberini as Stanley
- Augusto Poderosi as German officer
- Sándor Zsótér as Andras
- Matteo Rocchietta as young Andras
- Juli Básti as Eva
- Dorottya Udvaros as Zsuzsa
- Gyula Szabó as Rozsnyai (voice)
- Mária Varga as Mitzi (voice)
- Kati Kovács as Mitzi (singing voice)
- Anna Fehér as Marta (voice)
- János Csernák as Stanley (voice)
- Berta Domínguez D. (as Berta Domínguez)
- Hédi Temessy as Berta Domínguez (voice)
- Pál Mácsai as German officer (voice)
- Luigi Lucci as Sandor Rozsnyai at 6 years old
- Matteo Rocchietta as Sandor Rozsnyai at 12 years old

== Plot ==
A low born Roman Catholic Hungarian girl from a big family lives in poverty. She met and married a rich Jewish man, Mr Rozsnyai and they established a famous elite night club in 1931.

The world war changed everything. Their son committed suicide. After the German occupation of Hungary in March 1944, Mr Rozsnyai hid away but he was found and taken away by some corrupt Gestapo officers. Ms Rozsnyai tried to intercede, but was told that there was nothing they could do for her.

Mrs Rozsnyai then turned to her exdaughter-in-law, "La Belle" Márta Mázik, who in the meantime had a relationship with a German officer named Wilhelm. La Belle Marta promised to do his best and she went back to Ms Rozsnyai with the news that one of Wilhelm's friends could intervene on her behalf. He asked her to prepare her jewelry and valuables and get into the car that the Germans were sending, so she would be in a safe place with her husband. The car arrived at the agreed time, and Mrs Rozsnyai entered it. She was never seen alive again...

== Critical reception ==
Dan Pavlides of All Movie Guide said that the film had "uneven editing in places suggests that a lot of film ended up on the cutting-room floor."
