= A Strange Role =

1976 film

- Directed by: Pál Sándor
- Written by: Pál Sándor; Zsuzsa Tóth
- Starring: Margit Dajka
- Cinematography: Elemér Ragályi
- Edited by: Éva Kármentő
- Release date: 6 January 1976
- Running time: 87 minutes
- Country: Hungary
- Language: Hungarian

A Strange Role (Hungarian: Herkulesfürdői emlék, also known as Improperly Dressed and released in the US as Strange Masquerade) is a 1976 Hungarian drama film directed by Pál Sándor. It was entered into the 27th Berlin International Film Festival where it won the Silver Bear. The film was also selected as the Hungarian entry for the Best Foreign Language Film at the 50th Academy Awards, but was not accepted as a nominee.

== Plot ==
The film is about a young Hungarian Communist man, who ends up hiding from the country's White Russian oppressors in a remote sanatorium, disguised as a woman in 1919.

== Cast ==
- Margit Dajka – Öreg primadonna
- Irma Patkós – Kegyelmes Asszony
- Carla Romanelli – Olasznő
- Dezső Garas – Reményi / Glück úr / Fényképész
- Sándor Szabó – Wallach doktor
- Endre Holmann – Galambos Sarolta / Kövesi János (as Holman Endre)
- Hédi Temessy – Ágota kisasszony
- Ildikó Pécsi – Mesternő
- Mária Lázár – Füsthajú nő
- Ági Margittay – Ambrusné (as Margitai Ági)
- Erzsébet Kútvölgyi – Zsófi nővér
- András Kern – Ács István
- György Simon – Lajos bácsi
- Georgiana Tarjan – Reményi Margitka (as Györgyi Tarján)
- Márk Zala – Különítményes tiszt

== See also ==
- List of submissions to the 50th Academy Awards for Best Foreign Language Film
- List of Hungarian submissions for the Academy Award for Best Foreign Language Film
