= 12th European Film Awards =

1999 film awards ceremony in Germany

- Date: December 4, 1999
- Site: Schiller Theater, Berlin, Germany
- Hosted by: Mel Smith, Carole Bouquet
- Organized by: European Film Academy

Highlights
- Best Picture: All About My Mother
- Best Actor: Ralph Fiennes; Sunshine
- Best Actress: Cecilia Roth; All About My Mother
- Most awards: All About My Mother (3)

The 12th European Film Awards were presented on December 4, 1999, in Berlin, Germany. The winners were selected by the members of the European Film Academy.

== Awards ==
=== Best Film ===
English title	Original title	Director(s)	Country
All About My Mother	Todo sobre mi madre	Pedro Almodóvar	Spain
Show Me Love	Fucking Åmål	Lukas Moodysson	Sweden
Mifune's Last Song	Mifunes sidste sang	Søren Kragh-Jacobsen	Denmark
Moloch	Молох	Alexander Sokurov	Russia
Notting Hill		Roger Michell	United Kingdom
Rosetta		Luc and Jean-Pierre Dardenne	Belgium
Sunshine	A napfény íze	István Szabó	Canada, Hungary, Austria, Germany
The War Zone		Tim Roth	United Kingdom
