= Nimród Antal =

American filmmaker (born 1973)

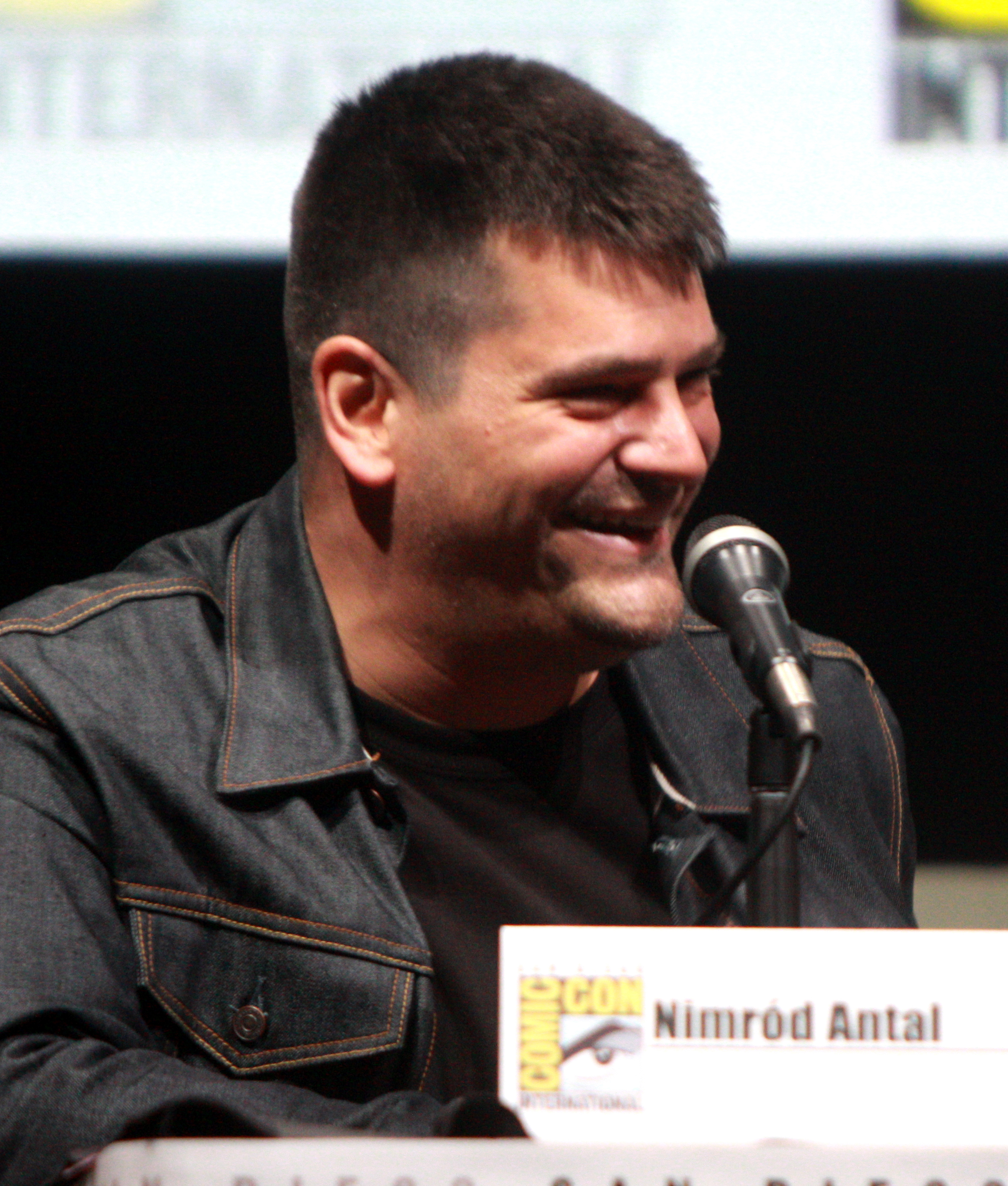
- Antal in 2013
- Born: Nimród E. Antal; November 30, 1973 (age 52); Los Angeles, California, U.S.
- Occupations: Director; screenwriter; actor
- Years active: 1994–present

Nimród E. Antal (Hungarian: [ˈɒntɒl ˈnimroːd]; born November 30, 1973) is a Hungarian-American filmmaker. He is best known for directing the films Vacancy (2007), Predators (2010), and Retribution (2023).

== Life and career ==
Antal was born in Los Angeles, California, to parents of Hungarian descent. In 1991, following his father's advice, Antal moved to Hungary to study at the Hungarian Film Academy in Budapest. After graduating, he worked in the Hungarian film and television industry; in 2005, he returned to Los Angeles and continued to work in the film and television industry in Hollywood.

=== Directing ===
Antal wrote and directed the Hungarian-language film Kontroll (2003), which won numerous awards, including the Award of the Youth at the 2004 Cannes Film Festival and the main prize at the Chicago International Film Festival, as well as a European Film Award nomination for Best Director and being selected as Hungary's submission to the Academy Award for Best Foreign Language Film. The backdrop of the film is the Budapest Metro subway system. Kontroll, refers to the act of ticket inspectors checking to ensure a rider has paid their fare.

Antal's first American feature film, Vacancy, starring Kate Beckinsale and Luke Wilson, was released on April 20, 2007. His second American film, Armored, was released in December 2009. Robert Rodriguez hired him to direct the film Predators. He directed the Metallica 3D concert movie/narrative film titled Metallica: Through the Never (2013).

Antal returned to Hungary to make The Whisky Bandit (2017), a biopic of infamous Hungarian bank robber Attila Ambrus.

Antal has directed for three television series, two of which were executive produced by M. Night Shyamalan – first, as a guest director on Wayward Pines, then as a regular director for Servant. In 2022, he directed two episodes of Stranger Things season 4.

=== Acting ===
Antal has appeared in acting roles in films including András Salamon's Közel a szerelemhez (1999) and Balra a nap nyugszik (2000), directed by András Fésös. He also had a cameo in Robert Rodriguez's 2010 film Machete.

== Filmography ==
Film

Year	Title	Director	Writer
2003	Kontroll	Yes	Yes
2007	Vacancy	Yes	No
2009	Armored	Yes	No
2010	Predators	Yes	No
2013	Metallica: Through the Never	Yes	Yes
2017	The Whiskey Bandit	Yes	Yes
2023	Retribution	Yes	No
2025	Afterburn	No	Yes

Television

Year	Title	Episode(s)
2015	Wayward Pines	"A Reckoning"
2019–2021	Servant	"Bear"
2019–2021	Servant	"Cricket"
2019–2021	Servant	"Marino"
2019–2021	Servant	"Goose"
2022	Stranger Things	"Chapter Five: The Nina Project"
2022	Stranger Things	"Chapter Six: The Dive"
