= Football of the Good Old Days =

- Directed by: Pál Sándor
- Starring: Dezső Garas; Tamás Major
- Cinematography: Elemér Ragályi
- Release date: 29 November 1973
- Running time: 1h 24min
- Country: Hungary
- Language: Hungarian

Football of the Good Old Days (Hungarian: Régi idők focija) is a 1973 Hungarian comedy film, which was based on Iván Mándy's novel 'A pálya szélén' (On the side of the field). Directed by Pál Sándor.

The catchphrase of the film: We need a team!

In 2012, it was included among the best 53 Hungarian works selected by members of the Hungarian Academy of Arts.

== Plot ==
The film takes place in Budapest in 1924. Ede Minarik, who is running a laundry operation, has only one passion: soccer. He dreams of his team, Csabagyöngye, getting into the first division against Fősör's team. For this purpose, he would be willing to sacrifice everything he has. But he has nothing, not even a whole team. The team is just like the age they live in.

But even then, "you need a team!"

The end of the film recalls an actual event: the national team from the Paris Olympics, which suffered a 3-0 defeat by Egypt, is waiting at the train station.

== Cast ==
- Dezső Garas - Ede Minarik, laundry operator
- Tamás Major - Mr. Kerényi
- László Márkus - Pipi Turner
- Hédi Temessy - Women in a hat
- Cecília Esztergályos - Ila, woman in a fur-coat
- Ildikó Szabó - buttered bread girl
- Gizi Péter - Aranka, wife of Ede Minarik
- András Kern - Kövesdi, reserve
- Vogt Károly - Vallay, goalkeeper
- Benkóczy Zoltán - Miatoff, left back
- Ferenczi Gábor - Bikácsi, right-wing
