= Daniel Takes a Train =

Music group from London

- Genres: 80s pop
- Years active: 1984 -
- Members: Paul Baker, Dan Synge, James Hannington, Jez Groves, Paul Davey
- Website: www.danieltakesatrain.com

Daniel Takes a Train is an '80s pop music group from London, England. Originally unsuccessful when first formed, the band reunited in 2008, going on to release several records that achieved critical and commercial success.

== History ==
The London-based band formed in 1984, naming themselves after the Hungarian movie of the same name. They nearly achieved fame, however by the end of the decade an ability to secure a record deal led to the group splitting up. They reformed in 2008 to enter a music competition, with members Paul Baker, Dan Synge, Rupert Blomfield, James Hannington and Paul Davey. Following a gig attended by Prince Harry, the group released its first single in December 2008, "One Last Dream". Critically described as "an '80s sound with a modern feel", the track spent 2 weeks on the UK Official Physical Singles Chart peaking at number 43.

German record label Firestation tracked down the bands previously released demos, and in 2018 released them as the album Style, Charm and Commotion. In 2021 Daniel Takes a Train released their first "proper" album. Produced by Pat Collier, Last Ticket To Tango has elements of ska, 80s synth pop, and soul and was generally critically well received. In 2025, the band released the single "Just Like Patsy Cline", which topped the Heritage Chart.

== Members ==
- Paul Baker (vocals)
- Dan Synge (guitar)
- Rupert Blomfield (bass 1984 to 2008)
- Paul Davey (saxophone)
- James Hannington (drums)
- Jez Groves (bass since 2008)

== Discography ==
=== Singles ===
- "One Last Dream" (2008)
- "Just Like Patsy Cline" (2025)

=== Albums ===
- Style, Charm and Commotion (2018)
- Last Ticket To Tango (2021)
