= Cserepek =

1980 film

- Directed by: István Gaál
- Written by: István Gaál
- Produced by: István Nemeskürty
- Starring: Zygmunt Malanowicz
- Cinematography: József Lörincz
- Edited by: István Gaál
- Release date: 1980
- Running time: 91 minutes
- Country: Hungary
- Language: Hungarian

Cserepek is a 1980 Hungarian drama film directed by István Gaál. It was entered into the 1981 Cannes Film Festival.

== Cast ==
- Zygmunt Malanowicz - Vígh András
- Katalin Gyöngyössy - András elvált felesége
- Tamás Horváth - Zoli
- Irma Patkós - Öregasszony
- Edit Soós - Aranka
- Eszter Szakács - Maja
- Bella Tanay - Pszichológusnõ
- Szilvia Várkonyi - Gyógypedagósnõ
- László Horváth
- József Bihari - András's dad (as Bihary József)
- Márton Kálmán
- Sándor Oszter - Villanyszerelõ
- Flóra Kádár
