= The Whiskey Bandit =

2017 Hungarian action film

- Film poster
- Directed by: Nimród Antal
- Written by: Nimród Antal
- Starring: Bence Szalay
- Music by: Yonderboi
- Release dates: 16 October 2017 (WFF); 22 November 2017 (Hungary)
- Running time: 126 minutes
- Country: Hungary
- Language: Hungarian

The Whiskey Bandit (Hungarian: A Viszkis) is a 2017 Hungarian action film about Attila Ambrus, a famous Hungarian bank robber.

== Cast ==
- Bence Szalay - Attila Ambrus
- Barnabás Szabó - young Attila Ambrus
- Zoltán Schneider - Det. Bartos
- Piroska Móga - Kata
- Viktor Klem - Géza Bota
- György Gazsó - Bota
- Judit Pogány - Aunt Annuska, Attila's grandmother
- Sándor Zsótér - Kata's father
- Ildikó Tóth - Kata's mother
- Attila Ambrus - taxi driver

== Release ==
The film premiered at the Warsaw International Film Festival on 16 October 2017 and was released in Hungary on 22 November 2017.
