= 27th Berlin International Film Festival =

1977 film festival in West Berlin, Germany

- Festival poster
- Opening film: Nickelodeon
- Location: West Berlin, Germany
- Founded: 1951
- Awards: Golden Bear: The Ascent
- Festival date: 24 June – 5 July 1977
- Website: Website

Berlin International Film Festival chronology
- 28th 26th

The 27th annual Berlin International Film Festival was held from 24 June to 5 July 1977. The festival opened with Nickelodeon by Peter Bogdanovich.

The Golden Bear was awarded to The Ascent directed by Larisa Shepitko. Since this edition the annual Retrospective and Homage events has been coordinated jointly between the festival organization and the Deutsche Kinemathek. The retrospective shown at the festival was dedicated to German actress Marlene Dietrich, which was divided into two parts, with Part 1 being shown this year along with the retrospective called Love, Death and Technology. Cinema of the Fantastical 1933–1945. The guest of the Homage was West German filmmaker Wilfried Basse.

== Juries ==
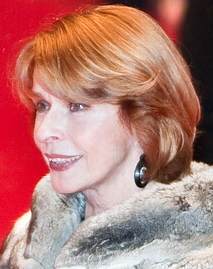
Senta Berger, Jury President

The following people were announced as being on the jury for the festival:

=== Main Competition ===
- Senta Berger, Austrian actress and producer – Jury President
- Ellen Burstyn, American actress
- Helène Vager, French producer
- Rainer Werner Fassbinder, West-German filmmaker, actor and producer
- Derek Malcolm, British journalist and film critic
- Andrei Mikhalkov-Konchalovsky, Soviet filmmaker
- Ousmane Sembène, Senegalese filmmaker, producer and author
- Humberto Solás, Cuban filmmaker
- Basilio Martín Patino, Spanish filmmaker

== Official Sections ==
=== Main Competition ===
The following films were in competition for the Golden Bear award:

English Title	Original Title	Director(s)	Production Country
The Anchorite	El anacoreta	Juan Estelrich	Spain, France
The Ascent	Восхождение	Larisa Shepitko	Soviet Union
A Strange Role	Herkulesfürdöi emlék	Pál Sándor	Hungary
Between the Lines		Joan Micklin Silver	United States
Black Litter	Camada negra	Manuel Gutiérrez Aragón	Spain
The Bricklayers	Los albañiles	Jorge Fons	Mexico
The Conquest of the Citadel	Die Eroberung der Zitadelle	Bernhard Wicki	West Germany
Cyclops	Циклопът	Christo Christov	Bulgaria
Day for My Love	Den pro mou lásku	Juraj Herz	Czechoslovakia
The Devil Probably	Le diable probablement	Robert Bresson	France
Don's Party		Bruce Beresford	Australia
Etuda o zkoušce		Evald Schorm	Czechoslovakia
The Expulsion from Paradise	Die Vertreibung aus dem Paradies	Niklaus Schilling	West Germany
Feniks		Petar Gligorovski	Yugoslavia
The Fifth Seal	Az ötödik pecsét	Zoltán Fábri	Hungary
Grete Minde		Heidi Genée	West Germany, Austria
Hitler: A Career	Hitler - Eine Karriere	Joachim Fest and Christian Herrendoerfer	West Germany
Jabberwocky		Terry Gilliam	United Kingdom
The Late Show		Robert Benton	United States
Mama, I'm Alive	Mama, ich lebe	Konrad Wolf	East Germany, Soviet Union
The Man Who Loved Women	L'Homme qui aimait les femmes	François Truffaut	France
Nickelodeon (opening film)		Peter Bogdanovich	United States
Ortsfremd ... wohnhaft vormals Mainzerlandstraße		Hedda Rinneberg and Hans Sachs	West Germany
Pigs Have Wings	Porci con le ali	Paolo Pietrangeli	Italy
Sentimental Romance	Сентиментальный роман	Igor Maslennikov	Soviet Union
Tenda dos Milagres		Nelson Pereira dos Santos	Brazil
The Widowhood of Karolina Žašler	Vdovstvo Karoline Žašler	Matjaž Klopčič	Yugoslavia

=== Out of competition ===
- Caudillo, directed by Basilio Martín Patino (Spain)
- Per questa notte, directed by Carlo Di Carlo (Italy)

=== Retrospective and Homage ===
The following films were shown in the retrospective dedicated to Marlene Dietrich (Part 1):

English title	Original title	Director(s)	Production Country
Blonde Venus		Josef von Sternberg	United States
The Blue Angel	Der blaue Engel	Josef von Sternberg	Germany
Dangers of the Engagement Period	Gefahren der Brautzeit	Fred Sauer	Germany
The Devil Is a Woman		Josef von Sternberg	United States
Dishonored		Josef von Sternberg	United States
Knight Without Armour		Jacques Feyder	United Kingdom
Morocco		Josef von Sternberg	United States
The Scarlet Empress		Josef von Sternberg	United States
Shanghai Express		Josef von Sternberg	United States
The Ship of Lost Souls	Das Schiff der verlorenen Menschen	Maurice Tourneur	Germany
Tragedy of Love	Tragödie der Liebe	Joe May	Germany

The following films were shown in the retrospective "Love, Death and Technology. Cinema of the Fantastical 1933–1945":

English title	Original title	Director(s)	Production Country
The Tunnel	Der Tunnel	Kurt Bernhardt	Germany
Master of the World	Der Herr der Welt	Harry Piel	Germany

== Official Awards ==
The following prizes were awarded by the Jury:

- Golden Bear: The Ascent by Larisa Shepitko
- Silver Bear – Special Jury Prize: The Devil Probably by Robert Bresson
- Silver Bear for Best Director: Manuel Gutiérrez Aragón for Black Litter
- Silver Bear for Best Actress: Lily Tomlin for The Late Show
- Silver Bear for Best Actor: Fernando Fernán Gómez for The Anchorite
- Silver Bear:
  - A Strange Role by Pál Sándor
  - The Bricklayers by Jorge Fons

== Independent Awards ==
=== FIPRESCI Award ===
- The Ascent by Larisa Shepitko
- Perfumed Nightmare by Kidlat Tahimik
