= My Father's Happy Years =

1977 film

- Directed by: Sándor Simó
- Written by: Sándor Simó
- Starring: Eszter Szakács
- Cinematography: Tamás Andor
- Edited by: Éva Kármentő
- Release date: 20 October 1977
- Running time: 89 minutes
- Country: Hungary
- Language: Hungarian

My Father's Happy Years (Hungarian: Apám néhány boldog éve) is a 1977 Hungarian drama film directed by Sándor Simó. It was entered into the 28th Berlin International Film Festival.

== Cast ==
- Eszter Szakács - Anya, Törökné
- Loránd Lohinszky - Apa, Török János
- Irma Patkós - Irma néni
- Judit Meszléry - Ilus, Szekeres felesége
- Dezső Garas - Martin doktor
- Georgiana Tarjan - Jutka (as Györgyi Tarján)
- István Bujtor - Negrelli Zsiga
- József Madaras - Szekeres Ede
- Péter Harsányi - Fiú
- Péter Andorai - Varga Ernő, kommunista
- Péter Müller
- Tamás Dunai - A gyárigazgató fia
