= Julian Rubinstein =

American journalist

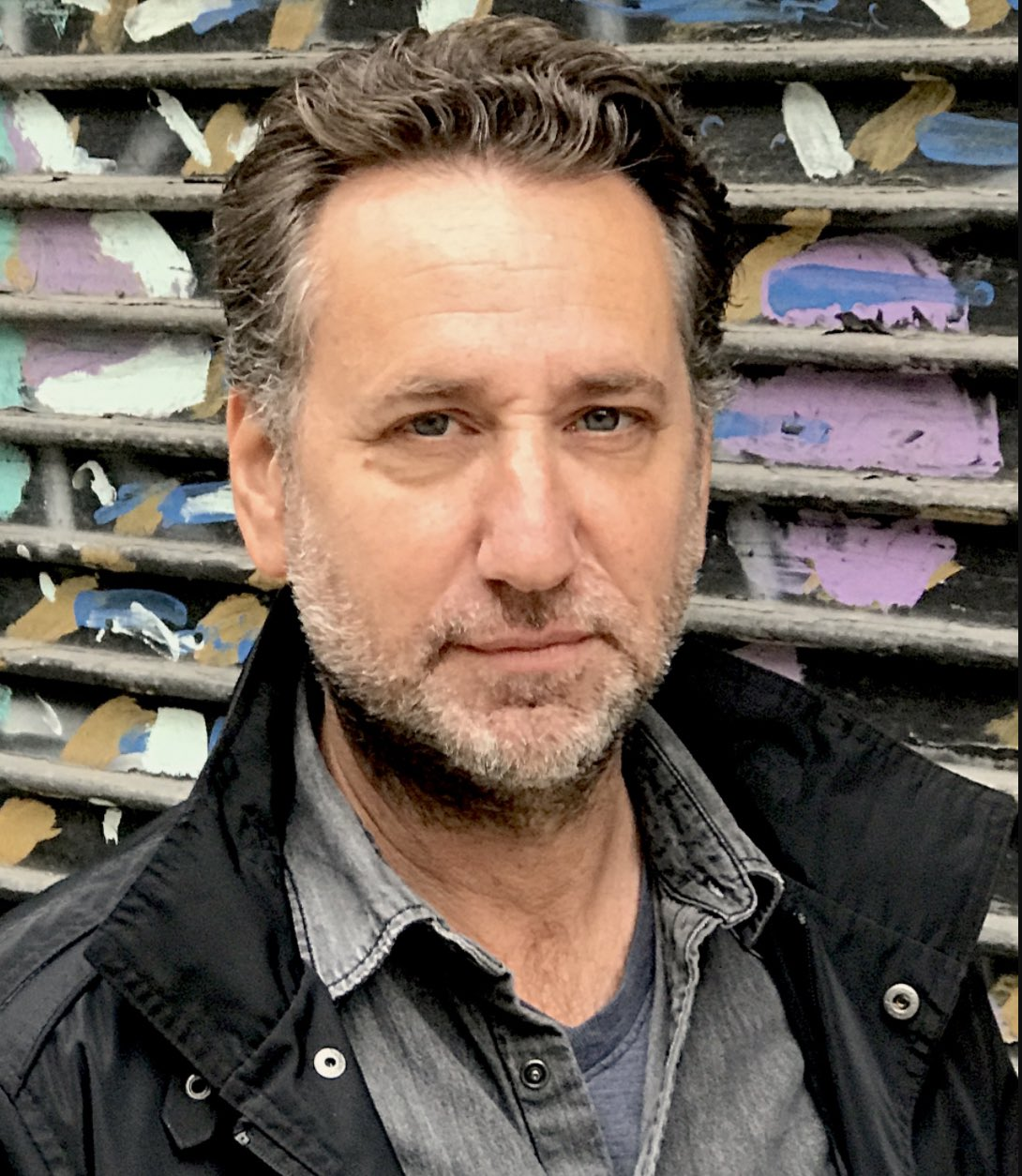
- Rubinstein in 2019
- Born: December 27, 1968 (age 57); Bronx, NY
- Education: Columbia University, MS, Journalism; Emory University, BA, Political Science
- Occupations: Journalist and Documentary Filmmaker
- Website: thehollyfilm.com

Julian Rubinstein December 27, 1968 (age 57) is an American journalist, documentary filmmaker and educator. He is best known for his documentary film and journalism work. His magazine work has appeared in the New Yorker, New York Times, and Rolling Stone and, he has written two non-fiction books, Ballad of the Whiskey Robber, which chronicles the life of one of the world's most popular living folk heroes and The Holly: Five Bullets, One Gun and the Struggle to Save an American Neighborhood, a multi-generational story of activism and gang violence in a gentrifying northeast Denver community. While reporting The Holly, he began directing and producing THE HOLLY, a feature-length documentary that captures significant problems in a federal anti-gang effort and the targeted takedown of an activist. In June, 2025, the film won a national Emmy Award.

== Early life ==
Rubinstein was born in 1968 in the Bronx. He is the son of David Rubinstein, a psychiatrist and medical director, and Diane Rubinstein, an aerospace engineer. The family moved to Denver from New York City in 1970. His father was diagnosed with cancer at age 49 and became known posthumously for his work counseling residents at Hospice of Metro Denver who didn't know he too was dying. His mother worked much of her career on government contracts, including missile defense.

Rubinstein attended Cherry Creek High School.

== Career ==
Rubinstein began his career as an agate clerk in the Washington Post Sports section, and wrote for the Sports and Style section, where he did music reviews and features. In 1994, he was hired as a reporter at Sports Illustrated, where he worked for four years, covering tennis, NFL, NBA and extreme sports. In 1996, he worked with senior writer Gary Smith on "Crime and Punishment: The Saga of Richie Parker, which won the 1997 National Magazine Award for Feature Writing.

Rubinstein became a freelance journalist. His story, "They Call It Suicide", published in Rolling Stone in 2000, was reported over several weeks in Mato Grosso do Sul in which he gained the trust of a Guarani Indian tribe fleeing the reservation in fear of its chief.

Rubinstein wrote what a lengthy profile of tennis player John McEnroe. The unabridged version of the profile appeared on the literary sports journalism site, SportsJones.com and espn.com, and an abridged version of the story was published in The New York Times Magazine in 2000. Rubinstein also chronicled the Hells Angels war with a rival biker gang, the Rock Machine, in Canada, and profiled the Hasidic international ecstasy kingpin, Jacob "Cookie" Orgad, a story selected for Best American Crime Writing.

In 2004, Rubinstein published his first non-fiction book Ballad of the Whiskey Robber, about the Hungarian bank robber and folk hero Attila Ambrus. The book was the winner of Borders' 2005 "Original Voices" Non-fiction Book of the Year and was a finalist for the 2005 Edgar Allan Poe Award for Best Fact Crime book and the 2005 Anthony Award for best Non-fiction book.

In 2013, Rubinstein's story "Operation Easter" appeared in The New Yorker for which Rubinstein gained access to illegal egg collectors in the U.K. The story was named one of the "5 Most Entertaining Stories of the Year" by Longreads, and was listed as a Notable story of the Year by Best American Science and Nature Writing. In 2006, he wrote about his relationship with his father, David Rubinstein, in 5280, Denver's city magazine, which was cited as a Notable Story in 2007 Best American Essays.

In 2021, after seven years of work, his book, The Holly: Five Bullets, One Gun and the Struggle to Save an American Neighborhood was released. In a starred review, Booklist called it "a shattering piece of investigative journalism involving street gangs, race relations and law enforcement." The New York Times Book Review named it an Editors' Choice, writing that it "expos[ed] the state surveillance, the crooked policing, the structural racism, the poverty, and the broken promises that had plagued the Holly for decades." Rubinstein appeared on NPR's All Things Considered with Michel Martin. The book was the winner of the 2022 Colorado Book Award for general nonfiction and the winner of the 2022 High Plains Book Award for Creative Nonfiction.

=== Documentary ===
In 2022, a rough cut of the documentary Rubinstein began filming while reporting The Holly was shown to Adam McKay, who told Deadline.com that he was "completely blown away," and offered to come on as an Executive Producer. The film premiered at Telluride Mountainfilm in May 2022 and won the Audience Choice Award. It went on to win several more awards, including the 2023 IRE (Investigative Reporters and Editors) Award for Best Documentary and the 2024 Heartland Emmy Award for Best Documentary. Because of the project's implication of wealthy and influential people and entities in Denver and their connection to street violence in a gentrifying community, Rubinstein faced threats and falsehoods about the work and had to leave Denver for his safety in 2021 and 2022. The Denver Gazette wrote that Rubinstein's film was "a documentary that the most powerful people in Denver don't want to see and don't want you to see," calling to project "Denver's very own Bonfire of the Vanities." The film was acquired by Gravitas Ventures, which released the film theatrically in March, 2023. Due to continued threats on his life, Rubinstein was placed in a Colorado state protection program. The film and book were also sued by two self-identifying gang members, though the case was dismissed with prejudice after the plaintiffs admitted that they had not read the book or seen the film. The film became a case study in the documentary community for how to withstand threats, falsehoods and legal challenges and was featured at the 2023 Double Exposure Investigative Film Festival in Washington DC and Columbia University's Graduate School of Journalism.

The film won a national Emmy at the 46th News and Documentary Emmys in June 2025.

Colorado College and the University of Denver's Media, Film and Journalism Studies Department partnered to present Rubinstein in conversation with Pulitzer Prize-winner Wesley Lowery in an event called "Battle for Truth." The Sentinel of Aurora, where Elijah McClain was killed and where Denver's gang violence has spilled into, called the film "a riveting look at metro police, gang violence and politics."

== Personal life ==
Rubinstein worked as an adjunct professor of journalism at Columbia University, and also as a senior producer for the school's Dart Center for Journalism and Trauma. In 2021, he was named a Visiting Professor of the Practice in Documentary Journalism at the University of Denver. In 2023, he was named Visiting Filmmaker and Journalist at Western Colorado University.

== Awards ==
- 2005 Winner, Borders "Original Voices" Best Non-fiction Book of the Year, Winner, Ballad of the Whiskey Robber
- 2007 Best American Essays, Notable Story of the Year, "Final Cut," 5280
- 2013 Best of Longform, 5 Most Entertaining Stories of the Year, "Operation Easter," New Yorker
- 2021 New York Times Editors' Choice, The Holly: Five Bullets, One Gun and the Struggle to Save an American Neighborhood
- 2021 Booklist Editors' Choice: Best of 2021,The Holly: Five Bullets One Gun and the Struggle to Save an American Neighborhood
- 2022 Winner, THE HOLLY, Audience Award, Best Documentary, Denver Film Festival
- 2022 Winner, THE HOLLY, Jury Prize, Best Documentary, Santa Fe International Film Festival
- 2022 Winner, THE HOLLY, Audience Choice Award, Telluride Mountainfilm Festival
- 2022 Winner, The Holly: Five Bullets, One Gun and the Struggle to Save an American Neighborhood, High Plains Book Award for Creative Nonfiction
- 2022 Winner, The Holly: Five Bullets, One Gun and the Struggle to Save an American Neighborhood, Colorado Book Award for General Nonfiction,
- 2023 Winner, THE HOLLY, IRE (Investigative Reporters and Editors) Award, Best Documentary
- 2024 Winner, Emmy Award, Best Documentary, National Academy of Television Arts and Sciences, Heartland
- 2025 Winner, Emmy Award, Outstanding Regional Documentary, National Academy of Television Arts and Sciences, News and Documentary

== Selected publications ==
=== Books ===
- Rubinstein, Julian (2004). Ballad of the Whiskey Robber. Little, Brown. ISBN 9780316071673.
- Rubinstein, Julian (2009). "Leaving Home." Published in Writing Away From Home, International Authors In Brussels, cahier, het beschrijf, pp 141–145.
- Rubinstein, Julian (2021). The Holly: Five Bullets, One Gun and the Struggle to Save an American Neighborhood.

=== Articles ===
- Rubinstein, Julian (January 27, 2000). "Being John McEnroe." The New York Times Magazine
- Rubinstein, Julian (June 8, 2000). "They Call It Suicide." Rolling Stone
- Rubinstein, Julian (September, 2001.) "X-Files." Details
- Rubinstein, Julian (July 22, 2013). "A Reporter at Large: Operation Easter". The New Yorker. Vol. 89, no. 21. pp. 52–61.
