= Judit Pogány =

Hungarian actress (born 1944)

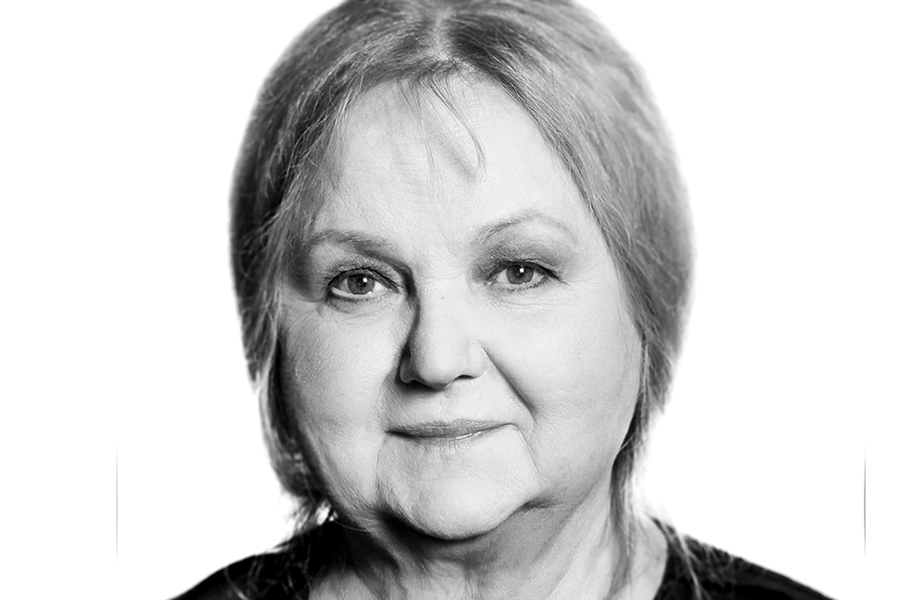
- Pogány in 2016
- Born: 10 September 1944 (age 82); Kaposvár, Hungary
- Occupation: Actress
- Years active: 1974–present

Judit Pogány (born 10 September 1944) is a Hungarian actress. She has appeared in more than seventy films since 1974.

== Selected filmography ==
Year	Title	Role	Notes
1976	Man Without a Name		
1981	The Little Fox	Young Vuk	voice only
1982	The Prefab People		
1982	Another Way	Magda	
1985	Szaffi		
1987	Love, Mother		
1988	Eldorado		
1989	The Pregnant Papa		
1996	Samba		
2011	Adventure		
2017	The Whisky Robber		
