= Zygmunt Malanowicz =

Polish actor (1938–2021)

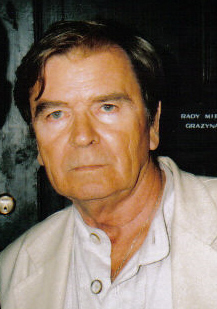
- Born: 4 February 1938; Korkożyszki, Poland (now Karkažiškė, Lithuania)
- Died: 4 April 2021 (aged 83); Warsaw, Poland
- Occupation: Actor
- Years active: 1962–2020

Zygmunt Malanowicz (4 February 1938 – 4 April 2021) was a Polish film actor. He appeared in more than 30 films from 1962 to 2020.

== Selected filmography ==
- Knife in the Water (1962)
- Naked Among Wolves (1963)
- Barrier (1966)
- Hunting Flies (1969)
- Landscape After the Battle (1970)
- Znaki na drodze (1970)
- Jarosław Dąbrowski (1976)
- Cserepek (1980)
- A Trap (1997)
- All That I Love (2009)
- The Lure (2015)
- Usta usta (2020)
