= Attila Ambrus =

Hungarian bank robber and hockey player

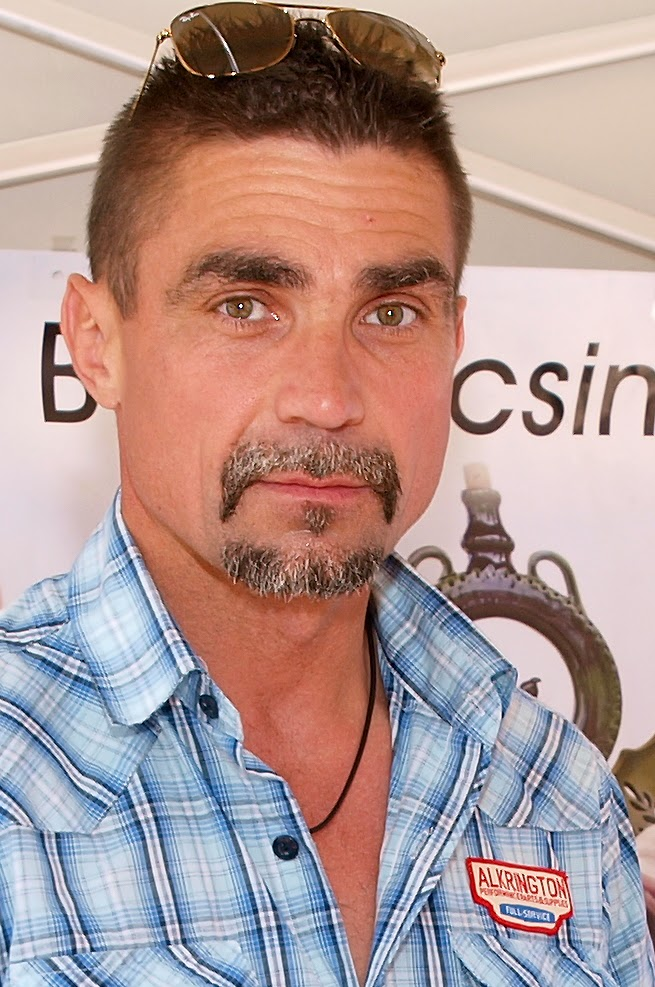
- Ambrus in 2013
- Born: October 6, 1967 (age 58); Fitod, Harghita County, Romania
- Other names: The Whiskey Robber, The Panther from Csík
- Title: bank robber

Attila Ambrus (born October 6, 1967), alias The Whiskey Robber, is a Hungarian former bank robber and professional ice hockey player. He became notorious during the 1990s for committing a string of undercover "gentleman robberies" in and around Budapest, Hungary, while working a day job as a goaltender. He became infamous in Hungary as a folk hero symbolic of the times in the decade after the introduction of capitalism to the former Communist state. Ambrus was eventually caught and imprisoned for about 12 years, released in 2012. His story was told in the 2004 book Ballad of the Whiskey Robber by author Julian Rubinstein and the 2017 film A Viszkis directed by Nimród Antal.

== Life and career ==
Ambrus was born in a Székely Hungarian family in Fitod, a small village in eastern Transylvania, Romania, right outside Miercurea Ciuc (Csíkszereda).

Ambrus had trouble with the law from a young age for committing petty thefts. In 1988, Ambrus illegally crossed Romania's borders by riding underneath a freight train and applied for political asylum and citizenship in Hungary, the latter of which he obtained in 1994.

Ambrus made a living through a variety of odd jobs, including being a gravedigger and a pelt smuggler, after which he tried out for the professional hockey team Újpesti TE. Despite his abysmal performance, he was admitted to the roster as goaltender while doubling as the team's janitor. Ambrus' hockey teammates gave him the nickname "The Panther from Csík." Ambrus's income continued to be insecure as he worked a variety of side jobs, and he committed his first robbery of a post office in 1993. After this success, Ambrus continued a string of 27 robberies of banks, post offices, and travel agents that ended with his arrest in 1999, stealing in all about 100 million forints (about half a million US dollars).

Ambrus became known as "The Whiskey Robber", because he was often seen drinking whiskey at a nearby pub prior to the robbery. While he later carried a gun, Ambrus never harmed anyone in his robberies, and was famous for his outlandish disguises, for presenting female tellers with flowers prior to robberies, and for sending the police bottles of wine. Immensely popular at the time of his arrest on January 15, 1999, a flag honoring the Whiskey Robber was flown at the UTE stadium for years afterwards.

Ambrus escaped from prison on July 10, 1999, using a rope made of shredded sheets, electric cords, and shoe laces. Nobody had ever escaped from that prison before. He evaded police custody for three months while living in a downtown Budapest apartment and was caught again after another robbery when police located his hideout after Ambrus accidentally left a piece of evidence behind at the crime scene. Ambrus was sentenced to 17 years in a maximum security prison. He was released early on parole because of good behavior on January 31, 2012.

Ambrus' accomplice on one of his earlier heists, Károly Antal (also a Romanian of Hungarian ethnicity), was caught at the Romanian-Hungarian border in 2004 and was sentenced to two and a half years of prison. His accomplice on most of his latter heists, Gábor Orbán, served an eight-year sentence in a medium security prison.

While in prison Ambrus took up pottery and after being released from jail in 2012 he continued pottery production in his native country, Romania, in Miercurea Ciuc. He has been the subject of six songs.

== In other media ==
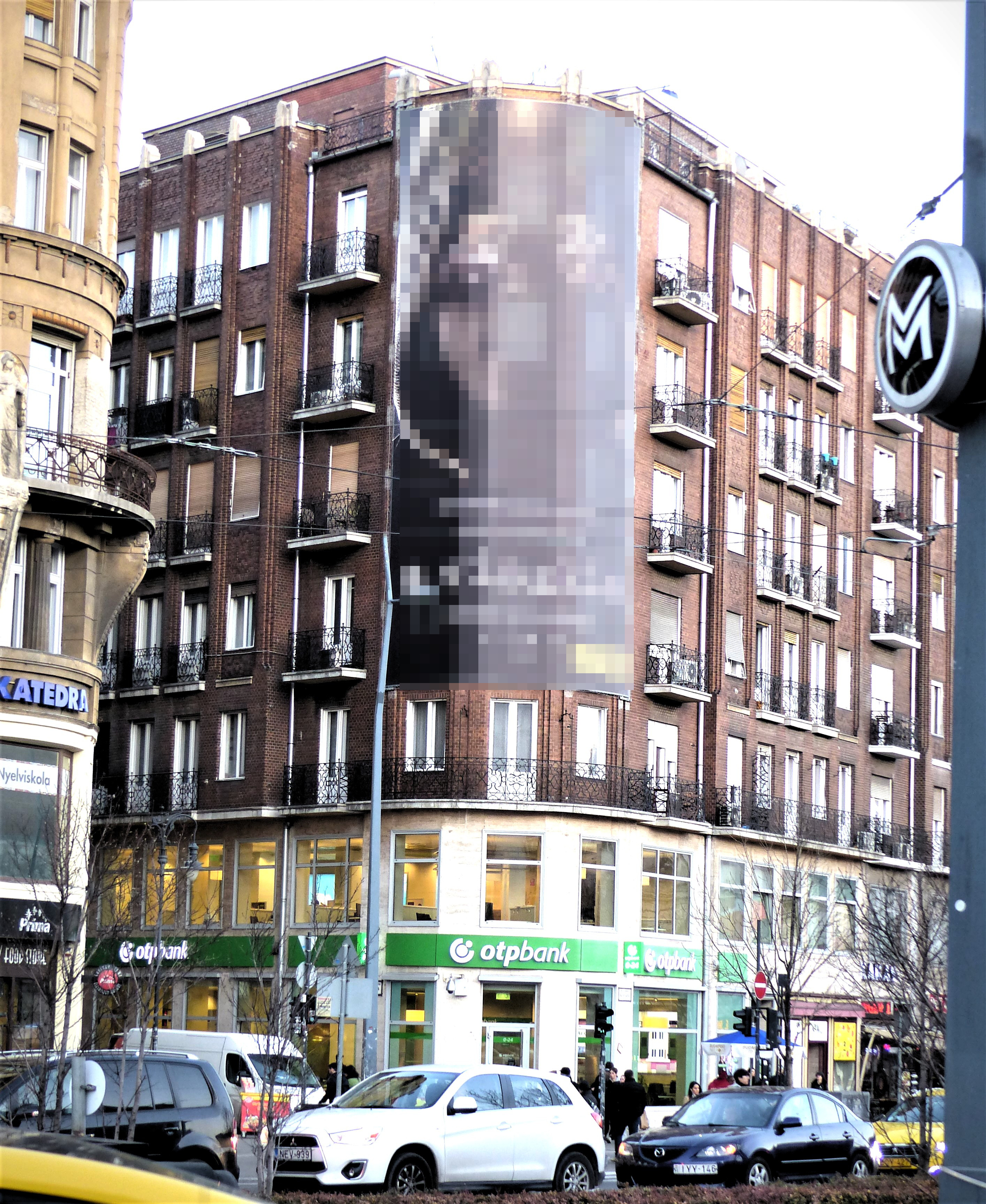
Promotion for A Viszkis in downtown Budapest

Ambrus was the subject of the award-winning book, Ballad of the Whiskey Robber (2004) by Julian Rubinstein. Rubinstein's book was adapted to audiobook with a full cast starring Eric Bogosian, Demetri Martin, novelist Gary Shteyngart, HBO Bored to Death's Jonathan Ames, novelist Arthur Phillips, singer Tommy Ramone and others; it was noted for its new approach to the medium. There have been Hungarian and German theater productions of scenes from the book. The book was optioned for film by Johnny Depp and Warner Bros. of which a screenplay was written that was named to Hollywood's 2008 Black List of best unproduced scripts of the year.

Ambrus' story was adapted to film by Nimród Antal; the film, titled The Whiskey Bandit (Hungarian: A Viszkis), was released in November 2017.
