= Elemér Ragályi =

Hungarian cinematographer (1939–2023)

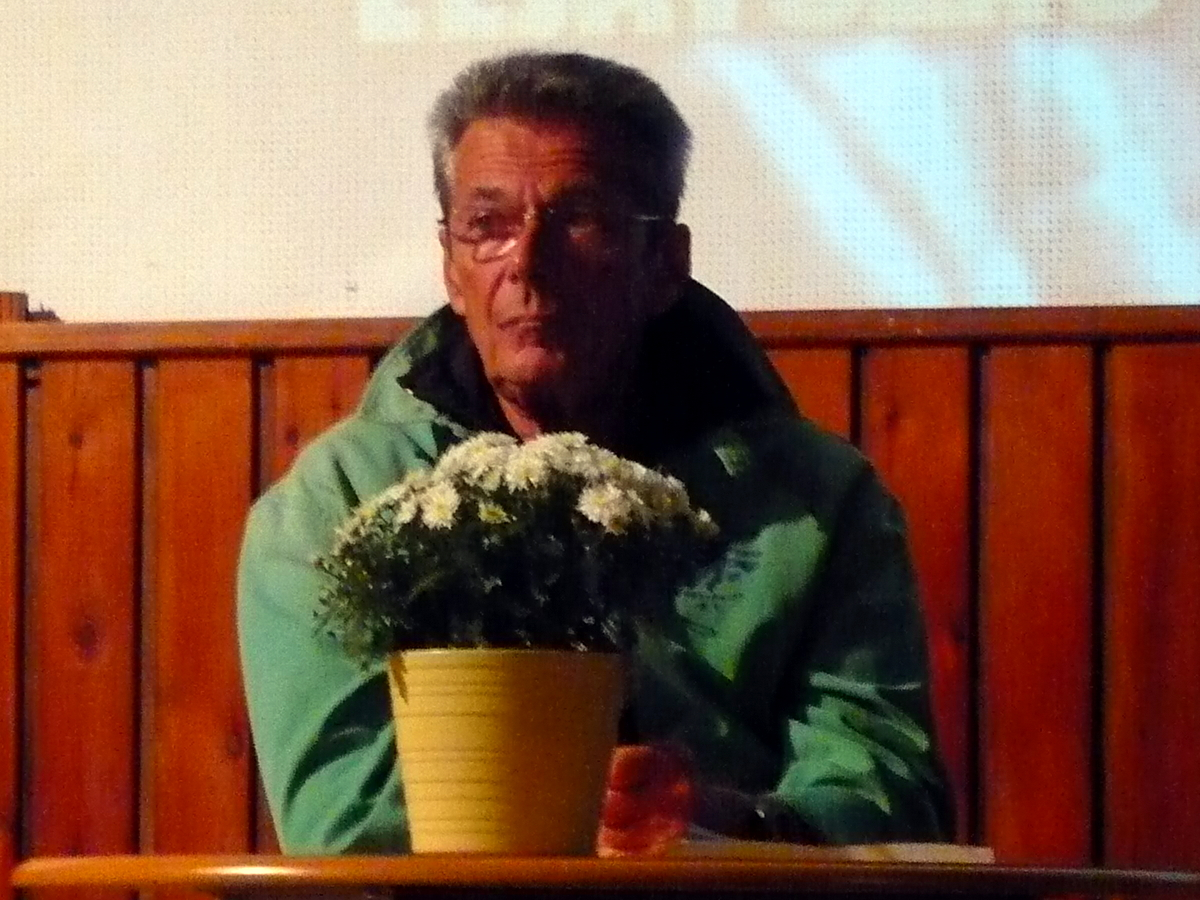
- Ragályi in 2012
- Born: 18 April 1939; Rákosliget, Hungary
- Died: 30 March 2023 (aged 83)
- Occupations: Cinematographer, film director

Elemér Ragályi (18 April 1939 – 30 March 2023) was a Hungarian cinematographer and film director. In 1996, he won a Primetime Emmy Award for his work on the television film Rasputin.

He died on 30 March 2023, at the age of 83.

== Filmography ==
- 1967 Meddig él az ember?
- 1968 Holtág
- 1968 Szeretnék csákót csinálni
- 1969 Vankóné Dudás Juli
- 1969 Látogatás
- 1969 Sziget a szárazföldön
- 1969 Kelj fel és járj!
- 1969 A nagy kék jelzés
- 1970 The Falcons
- 1970 Arc
- 1970 Befejezetlenül
- 1970 Büntetőexpedíció
- 1971 Staféta
- 1971 Sárika, drágám
- 1971 Madárkák
- 1971 Tanítókisasszonyok
- 1971 Botütés saját kérésre
- 1973 Photography
- 1973 Kakuk Marci
- 1974 Istenmezején
- 1974 Álmodó ifjúság
- 1973 Football of the Good Old Days
- 1973 Szónokképző iskola
- 1974 Bástyasétány 74
- 1974 Egy kis hely a nap alatt
- 1975 Szilveszter
- 1975 Boldog békeidők
- 1975 Egyszerű történet
- 1975 Vörös rekviem
- 1976 Talpuk alatt fütyül a szél
- 1976 Pókfoci
- 1977 A Strange Role
- 1977 Sámán
- 1977 Csatatér
- 1977 Kihajolni veszélyes!
- 1977 A kétfenekű dob
- 1978 Szabadíts meg a gonosztól!
- 1978 A trombitás
- 1979 Majd holnap
- 1979 Az utolsó előtti ítélet
- 1979 Vasárnapi szülők
- 1980 Örökség
- 1980 Vámmentes házasság
- 1980 Búcsú
- 1981 Néphagyományok
- 1981 Ripacsok
- 1981 Kabala
- 1981 A Koncert
- 1982 The Vulture
- 1982 Szerencsés Dániel
- 1983 Brady's Escape
- 1984 Flowers of Reverie
- 1984 Csak egy mozi
- 1984 Társasutazás
- 1985 Embriók
- 1985 Tanner
- 1986 A nagy generáció
- 1986 Love, Mother
- 1986 Hol volt, hol nem volt
- 1986 Varázslat
- 1987 Téli Magyarország
- 1988 Hanna's War
- 1988 Miss Arizona
- 1988 Túsztörténet
- 1989 Murderers Among Us: The Simon Wiesenthal Story
- 1989 The Phantom of the Opera
- 1989 Red King, White Knight
- 1989 Max and Helen
- 1989 Journey of Hope
- 1990 Mack the Knife
- 1990 Judgment
- 1990 The Josephine Baker Story
- 1991 The Gravy Train Goes East
- 1992 Teamster Boss: The Jackie Presser Story
- 1992 Maigret
- 1993 Family Pictures
- 1994 Mesmer
- 1995 A Kid in King Arthur's Court
- 1995 Never Talk to Strangers
- 1995 Catherine the Great
- 1996 Sztracsatella
- 1996 Rasputin: Dark Servant of Destiny
- 1996 Trilogy of Terror II
- 1997 Out of Order
- 1997 The Hunchback
- 1997 Ms. Scrooge
- 1998 Crime and Punishment
- 1998 A Knight in Camelot
- 1999 Jakob the Liar
- 1999 Mary, Mother of Jesus
- 2000 David Copperfield
- 2000 In the Beginning
- 2001 An American Rhapsody
- 2001 Anne Frank: The Whole Story
- 2002 Dracula
- 2002 Szerelemtől sújtva
- 2003 Apám beájulna
- 2003 A Rózsa énekei
- 2003 A Long Weekend in Pest and Buda
- 2003 Európából Európába
- 2004 Dark Kingdom: The Dragon King
- 2005 Csudafilm (also writer and director)
- 2006 Nincs kegyelem (also writer and director)
- 2007 The Moon and the Stars
- 2012 The Door
- 2014 Corn Island
- 2016 Gondolj rám
- 2017 Budapest noir
- 2017 1945
