= Daughter of Darkness (1990 film) =

1990 television film directed by Stuart Gordon

- Home video cover
- Genre: Horror
- Written by: Andrew Laskos
- Directed by: Stuart Gordon
- Starring: Anthony Perkins; Mia Sara; Robert Reynolds; Dezsõ Garas; Jack Coleman
- Composer: Colin Towns
- Country of origin: United States

Production
- Executive producers: Gerald W. Abrams; Harry Chandler
- Producer: Andras Hamori
- Production location: Hungary
- Cinematography: Iván Márk
- Editor: Andrew Horvitch
- Running time: 120 minutes
- Production company: King Phoenix Entertainment

Original release
- Network: CBS
- Release: January 26, 1990

Daughter of Darkness is a 1990 American made-for-television supernatural horror film directed by Stuart Gordon and starring Anthony Perkins, Mia Sara, Dezsõ Garas and Jack Coleman. It originally premiered on CBS on January 26, 1990.

== Plot ==
Katherine Thatcher (Mia Sara), a young woman trying to learn the identity of her father, is drawn into a Romanian vampire underworld. She is unaware that her father (Perkins) is a vampire. The vampire community is surprised to find that someone has been born from a union between a vampire and a woman and they seek to draw her into their plans.

== Cast ==
- Anthony Perkins - Anton/Prince Constantine
- Mia Sara - Katherine Thatcher
- Robert Reynolds - Grigore
- Dezsõ Garas - Max
- Jack Coleman - Devlin
- Erika Bodnár - Nicole
- Ági Margittay - Ági Margitai
- Mari Kiss - Elena

== Production ==
The film featured actors Anthony Perkins, Mia Sara and Jack Coleman. Director Stuart Gordon originally scouted locations in Romania for the film but later chose to shoot on location in Hungary.

== Release ==
Daughters of Darkness was shown on CBS on January 26, 1990.

== Reception ==
Jon Burlingame commented on the film in the Intelligencer Journal, noting the film's political elements, such as setting the film in Romania four months before democracy was brought to the country. However, Burlingame said that the film eventually succumbed to "standard horror-film conventions" and that Anthony Perkins "is reduced to doing a bad Bela Lugosi imitation, albeit heroically." Rick Kogan of the Chicago Tribune also commented on Perkins, stating he was beginning to "look and act as haggard and haunted as if he really had been living at the Bates Motel (don't even wonder how goofy his accent is here)." Kogan found that Gordon's "expansive and clever horror-habits are muted and constrained by the small screen."
