= Daniel Takes a Train (film) =

1983 Hungarian film

- Szerencsés Dániel
- Directed by: Pál Sándor
- Written by: Zsuzsa Toth
- Starring: Péter Rudolf, Sándor Zsótér, Kati Szerb, Mari Töröcsik, Dezsö Garas, Gyula Bodrogi
- Release date: 1983
- Running time: 92 minutes
- Country: Hungary

Daniel Takes a Train (Hungarian: Szerencsés Dániel) is a 1983 Hungarian thriller film directed by Pál Sándor. Set at the time of Hungarian Revolution of 1956, the film follows Daniel and his search for romantic interest Mariann. The film is one of the first to address the events of the revolution, and was cited by the New York Times as a "good introduction to Hungarian cinema".

Daniel Takes a Train was screened at the 1983 Cannes Film Festival, where it won a FIPRESCI award. The film inspired the name of music group Daniel Takes a Train.

== Cast ==
- Péter Rudolf
- Sándor Zsótér
- Kati Szerb
- Mari Törőcsik
- Dezsö Garas
- Gyula Bodrogi
- Ági Margitai
- Tamás Major
