= Leliceni =

Leliceni Csíkszentlélek
- Commune
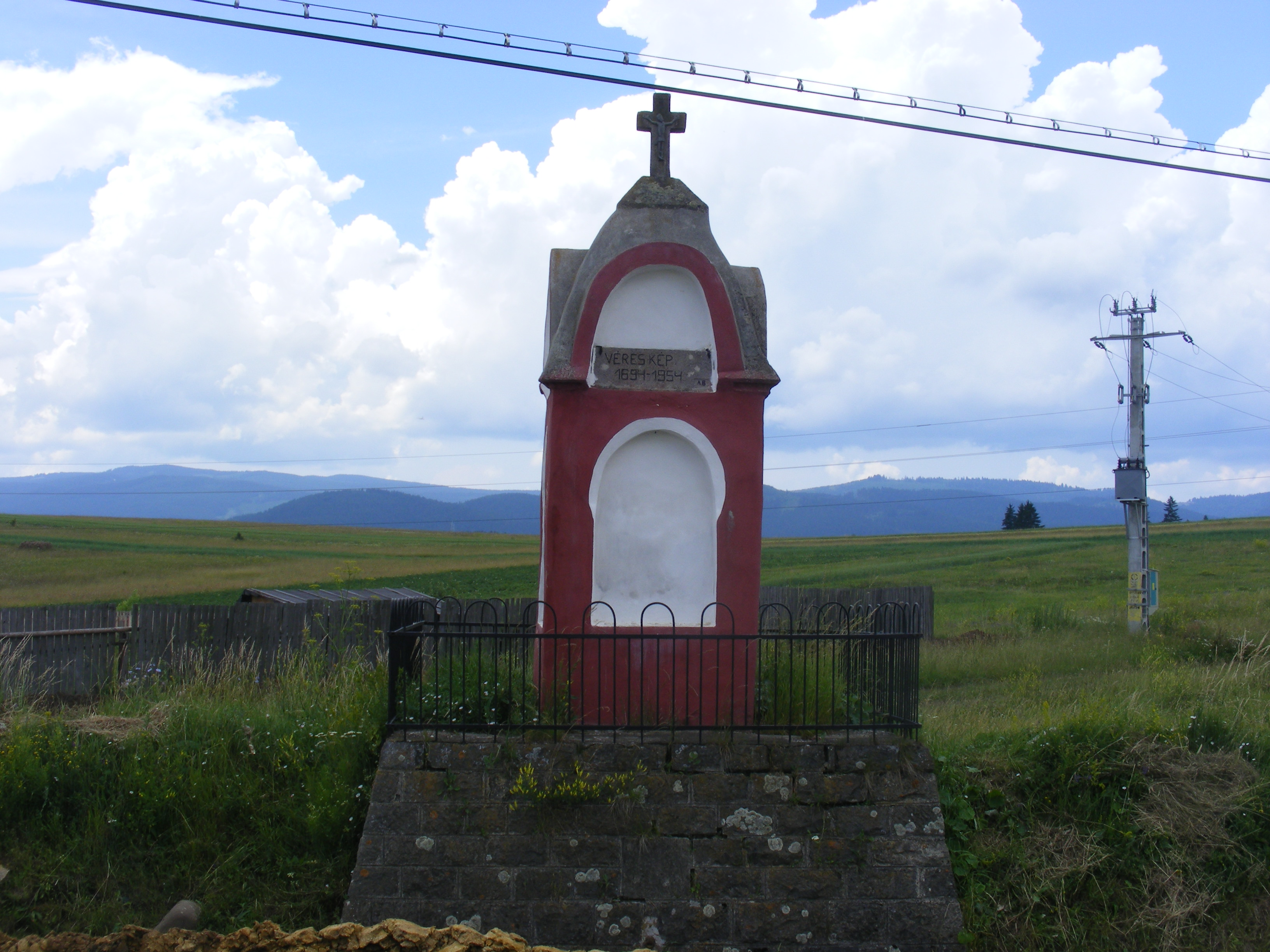
- The "bloody face"

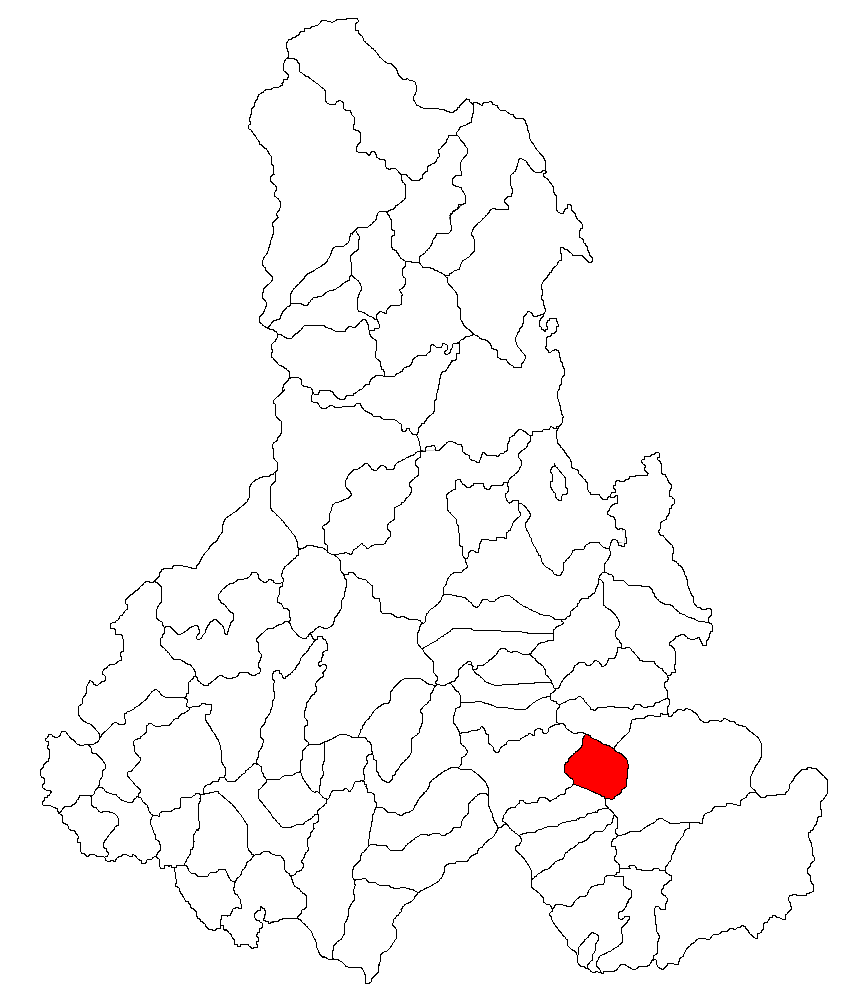
- Location in Harghita County

- Location in Romania
- Coordinates: 46°21′N 25°51′E
- Country: Romania
- County: Harghita

Government
  - Mayor (2020–2024): István-Alfréd Nagy (UDMR)
- Area: 36.91 km^{2} (14.25 sq mi)
- Population (2021-12-01): 2,471
  - Density: 66.95/km^{2} (173.4/sq mi)
- Time zone: UTC+02:00 (EET)
  - Summer (DST): UTC+03:00 (EEST)
- Postal code: 537268
- Area code: +40 266
- Vehicle reg.: HR

Leliceni (Hungarian: Csíkszentlélek or colloquially Szentlélek, meaning "Holy Spirit", Hungarian pronunciation:[ˈtʃiːksɛntleːlɛk]) is a commune in Harghita County, Romania. It lies in the Székely Land, an ethno-cultural region in eastern Transylvania.

== Component villages ==
The commune is composed of four villages:

In Romanian	In Hungarian	Population
Fitod	Fitód	443
Hosasău	Hosszúaszó	1
Leliceni	Csíkszentlélek	283
Misentea	Csíkmindszent	1032

== History ==
The main village was first mentioned in 1251 by its Hungarian name as castrum Zenth Lelewk. In 1602, it was recorded as Szentlélek and in 1913 as Csikszentlélek. Its original Romanian names was Cic-Sânlelec which was later Romanianized to the current official name. The villages forming the commune belonged to Csíkszék district until the administrative reform of Transylvania in 1876, when they fell within the Csík County in the Kingdom of Hungary. After the Treaty of Trianon of 1920, they became part of Romania and fell within Ciuc County during the interwar period. In 1940, the second Vienna Award granted the Northern Transylvania to Hungary and the villages were held by Hungary until 1944. After Soviet occupation, the Romanian administration returned and the commune became officially part of Romania in 1947. Between 1952 and 1960, the commune fell within the Hungarian Autonomous Province, between 1960 and 1968 the Mureș-Hungarian Autonomous Province. In 1968, the province was abolished, and since then, the commune has been part of Harghita County.

The most important component village of the commune is Misentea (Hungarian: Csíkmindszent, or colloquially Mindszent, Hungarian pronunciation:[ˈtʃiːkmindsɛnt], meaning "All Saints"). It was first recorded as Omnes Sancti in 1332. The village, composed of scattered houses at that time, had already existed in the era of the Árpád dynasty. It was burned down by Ottoman troops in 1661 when half of the village people perished. In 1719, it was hit by a plague. Biblical names are given for the parts of the village, which is explained by the fact that a 19th-century local priest is said to have replaced the Szekely placenames given under the ancient decimal tribal system by biblical names. Its school was already in operation as early as in 1590. In 1910, it had 1190 Hungarian inhabitants. Today, the wood industry provides the main economic activity.

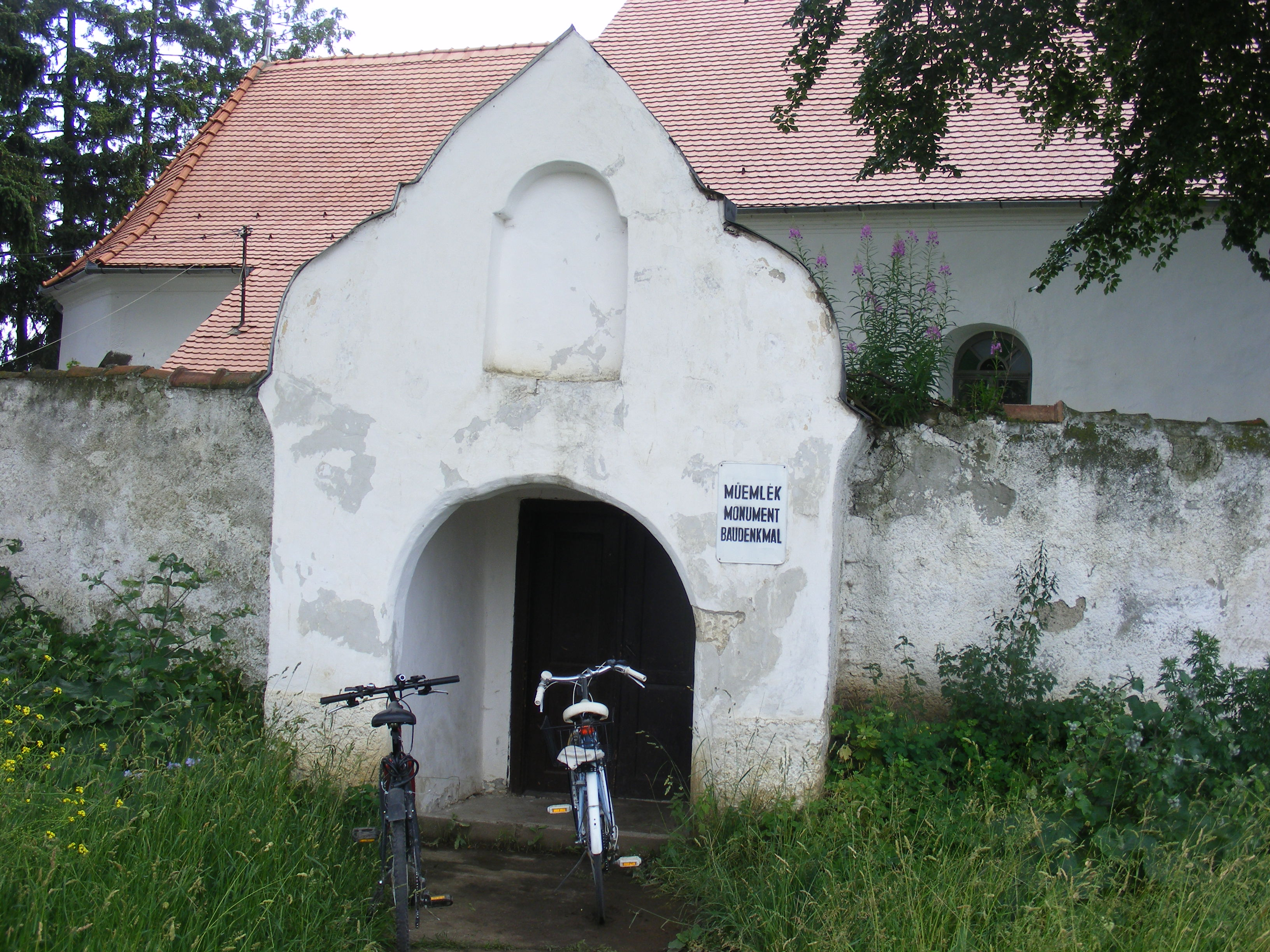
Misentea fortified church

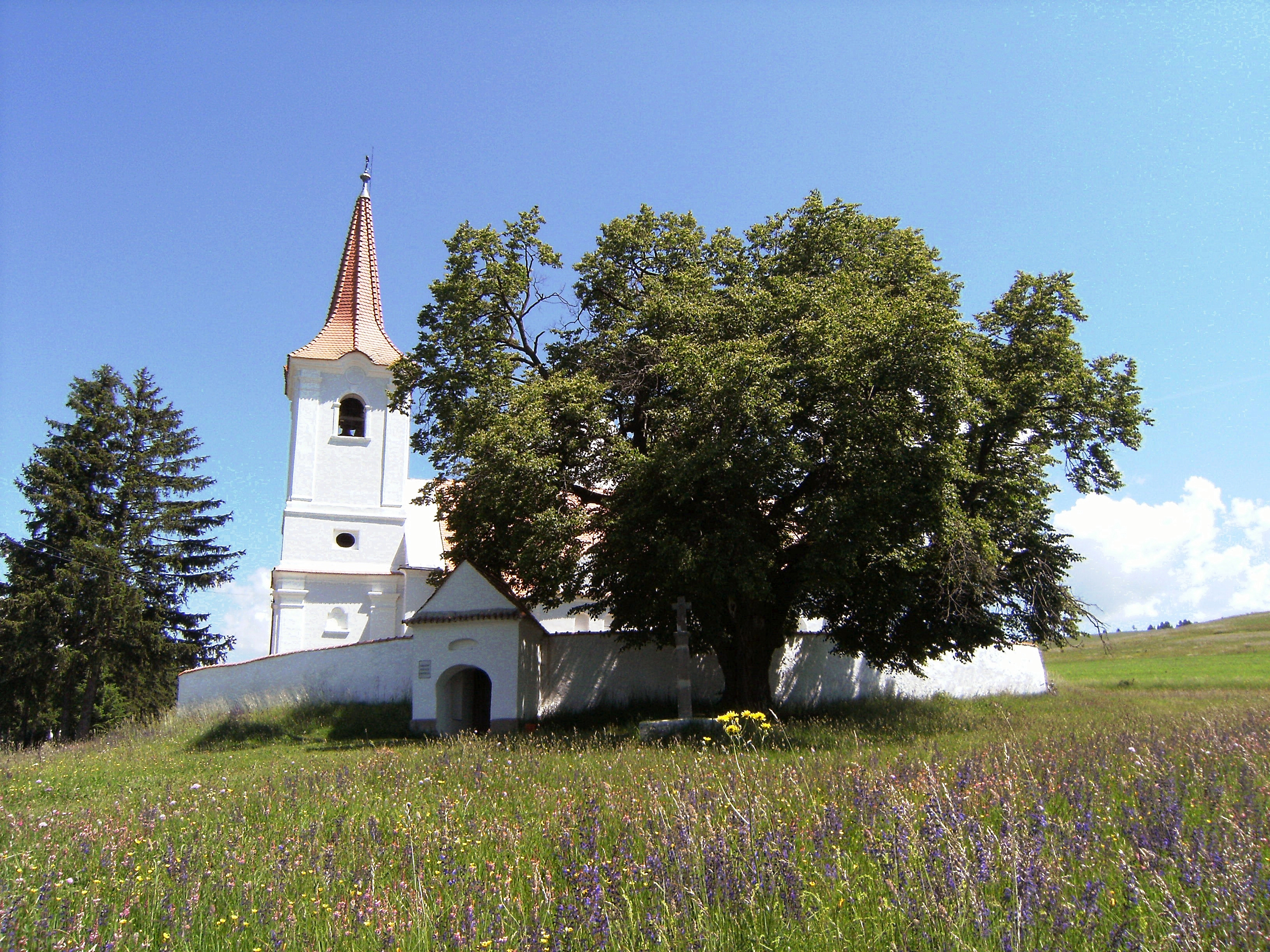
Lime in Leliceni

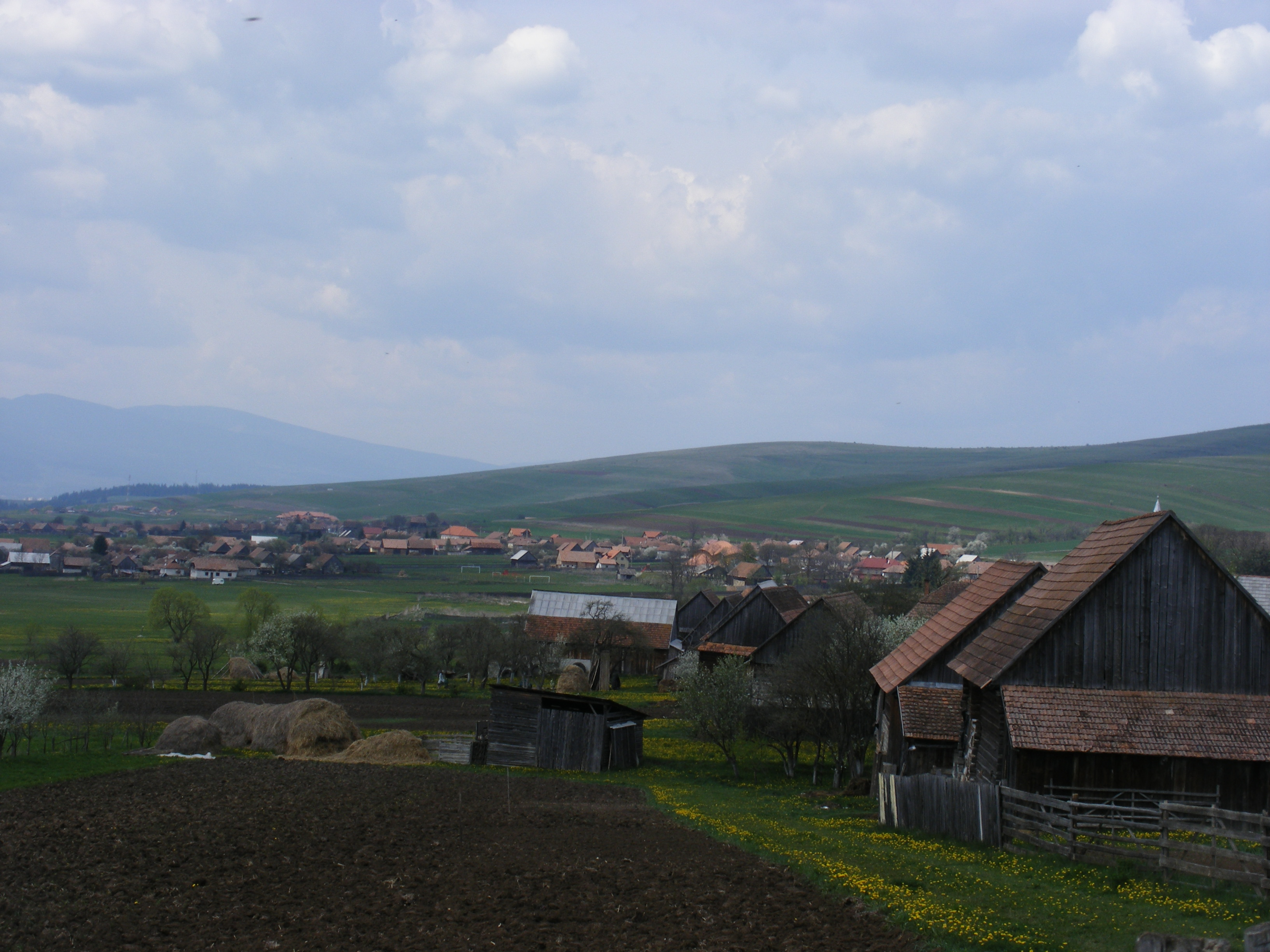
Misentea landscape

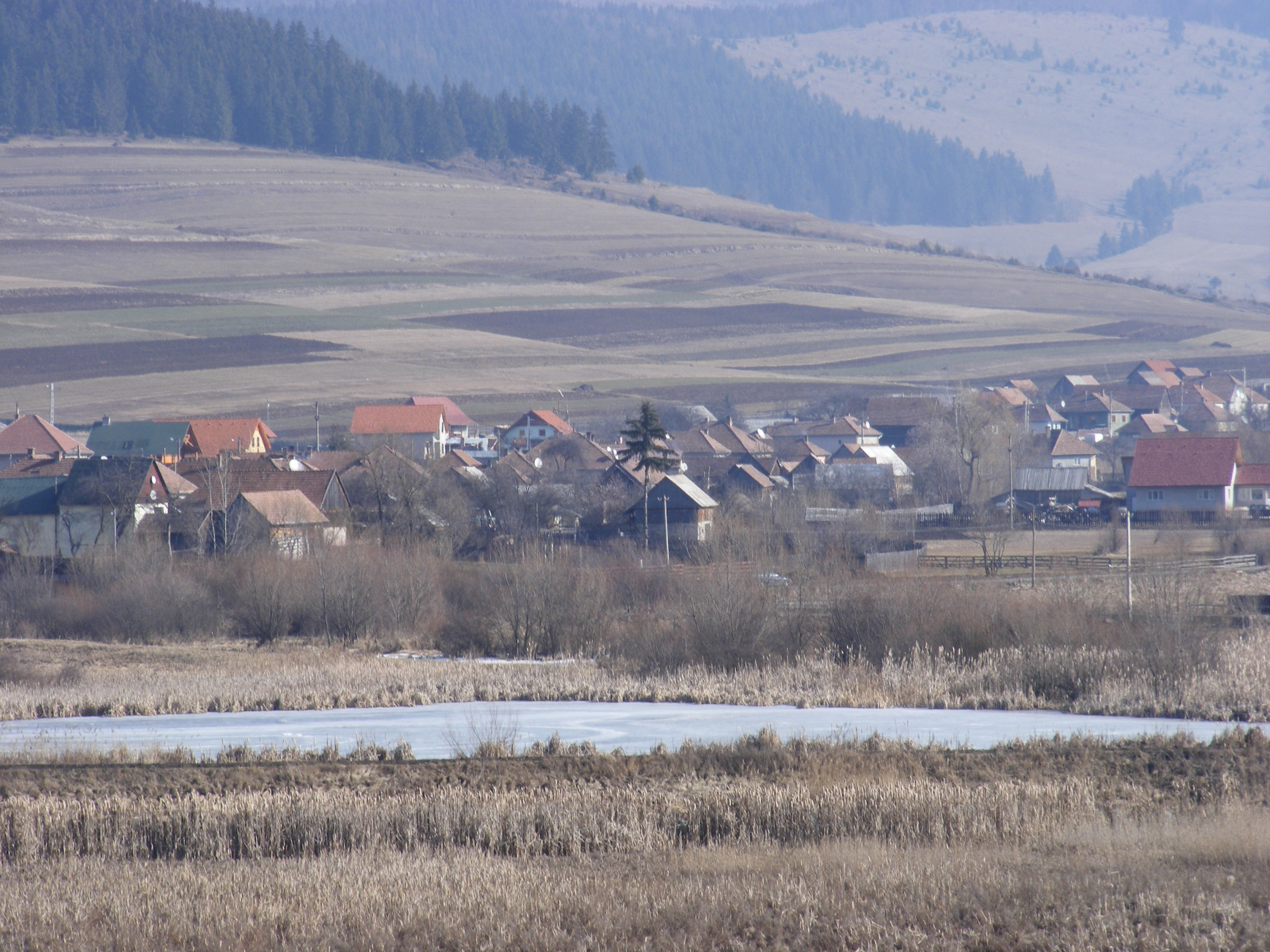
Fitod

Péter Pál Domokos discovered here the local songbook compiled by János Bochkor between 1716 and 1739.

== Demographics ==
The commune has an absolute Székely (Hungarian) majority. According to the 2011 census it has a population of 2,002; of which 96.75% or 1,937 are Hungarian.

Formerly part of Sâncrăieni commune, the 4 villages broke off in 2004 with a population of 1,721.

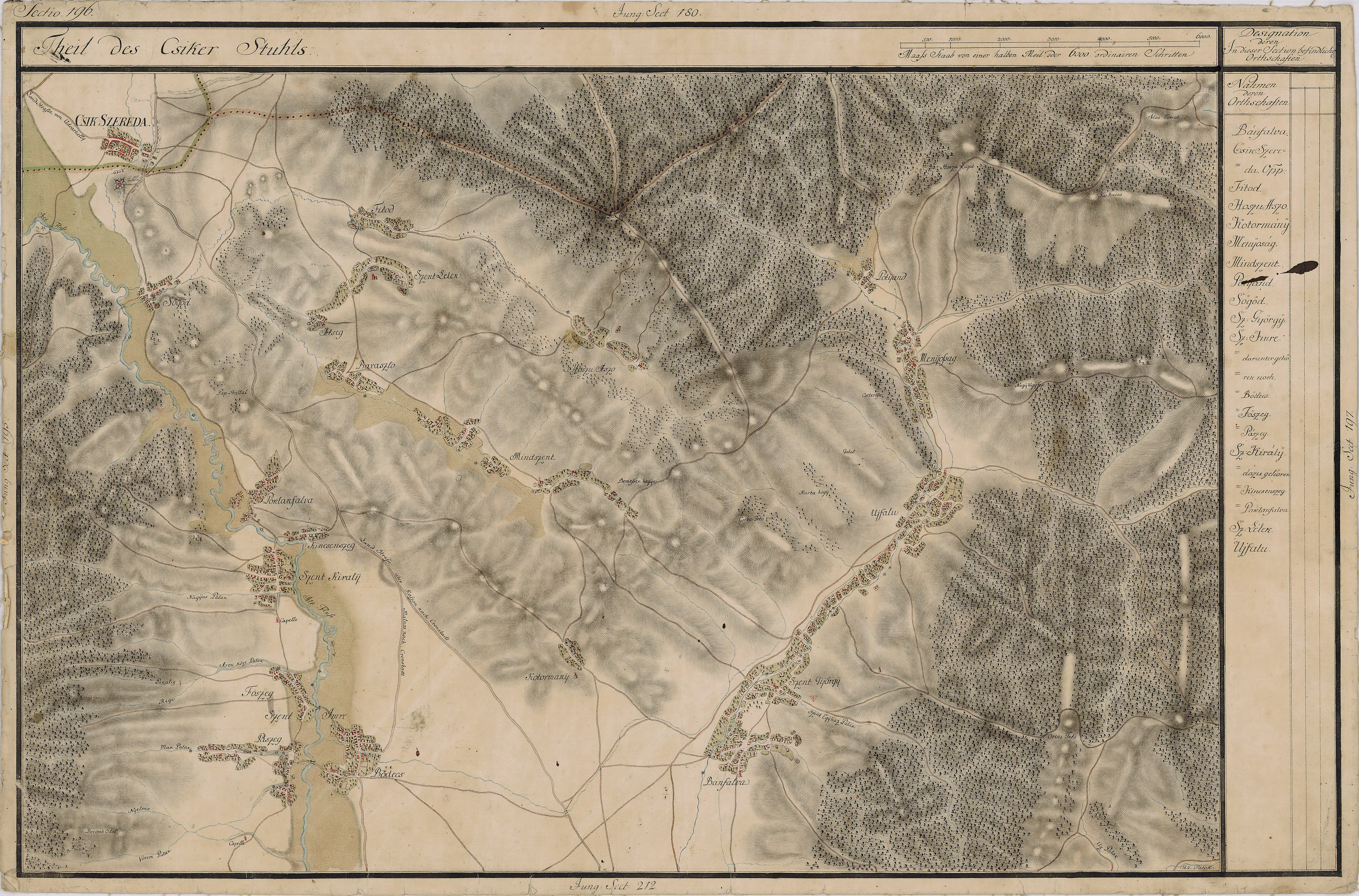
The villages on Josephine Land Survey, 1769-1773

== Landmarks ==
- Built in the 14th century and expanded in the 15th century, its church received its present form in 1806. Its winged altar was made by the order of the Czakó-family in 1510 as proven by the inscription it bears: „Insignia Filiorum Czakó 1510. Insignia Regis Ungarie”. It is now in the Hungarian National Museum in Budapest. The church bell is from 1511. In front of the church, an old linden tree stands under which the Székelys used to discuss their business according to ancient pagan customs,
- next to the church is a 500-year-old winter linden (Tilia cordata), which was voted "European Tree of the Year" in 2011.
- At the side of the main road stands the so-called "Bloody Face" or "Red Picture", a 5.5-meter-high cone-shaped monument erected in memory of the 1694 Tatar invasion when the Székelys defeated the intruders,
- On the Paphalála (Priest’s Death) hill, there used to be a Chapel. The hill gained its name from the decapitation of dean János Gyergyai by order of royal judge Kelemen Mikes that took place here in 1697. The dean was shortened for having entered into a marriage.

== Notable people ==
- Péter Ágoston, jesuit monk and famous preacher, was born here in 1617
- Vazul Bándi, historian of the Csíksomlyó Grammar School, was born here in 1847
- István Nagy, painter, born in Csíkmindszent (Misentea) in 1873
- Attila Ambrus, bank robber and professional ice hockey player, born in Fitod in 1967

== Twinning ==
- Pusztaederics, Hungary
- Fülöpjakab, Hungary
- Mindszent, Hungary
