= Zsuzsa Nyertes =

Hungarian actress

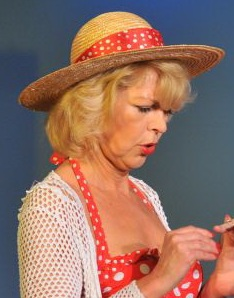
- Born: Zsuzsanna Nyertes; 14 December 1958 (age 67); Budapest, Hungary
- Education: Academy of Drama and Film in Budapest
- Occupation: Actress
- Years active: 1983–present

Zsuzsa Nyertes (born Zsuzsanna Nyertes; 14 December 1958) is a Hungarian actress.

== Life ==
In 1983, she graduated from the Academy of Drama and Film in Budapest and was a member of the Vidám Színpad. She has a diverse repertoire of performances, from cabaret to comedy to musicals. She also took part in television broadcasts as well. She married and had a daughter born in 1993. She currently owns a beauty salon, regularly writes poems, and published a book of poems. At the age of 42, she was featured in Playboy as a Marilyn Monroe's look-alike. She regularly features in game and fashion shows.

== Awards ==
- The Knight's Cross of the Hungarian Order of Merit (2009)
- Pepita Különdíj (2014)
- Nagy Miklós Vándor-díj (2015)

== Filmography ==
=== Feature films ===
- Szegény Dzsoni és Árnika (1983)
- István, a király (1984)
- Nyitott ablak (1988)
- Amerikából jöttem... (1989)
- Hamis a baba (1991)
- A három testőr Afrikában (1996)
- Érzékek iskolája (1996)
- Egy hét Pesten és Budán (2003)

=== Television film ===
- Tizenhat város tizenhat lánya (1979)
- Reggelire legjobb a puliszka (1983)
- Mint oldott kéve 1–7. (1983)
- Csodatopán (1984)
- Linda (1984–1989)
- Kaviár és lencse (1985)
- A kaméliás hölgy (1986)
- Az angol királynő (1988)
- Napóleon (1989)
- Polizeiruf 110: Der Tod des Pelikan (1990)
- Família Kft. (1991)
- Űrgammák (1995)
- Barátok közt (2001)

Entertainment

- Új Gálvölgyi-show (1991–1992)
- Gálvölgyi szubjektív (1994)
- Kern András-bohózatok
- Színésznők a kifutón
- Gálvölgyi-show (2005–2007)
- Best of 50 Gálvölgyi
- Kabarémúzeum (2006)

=== Syncing ===
- Flug des Falken (1985)
- Spinédzserek (1996–1999)
- Titkolt titkos ügynök (1991)

== CDs and audiobooks ==
- Little Red Riding Hood and other Grimm Tales
