= Dezső Garas =

Hungarian actor

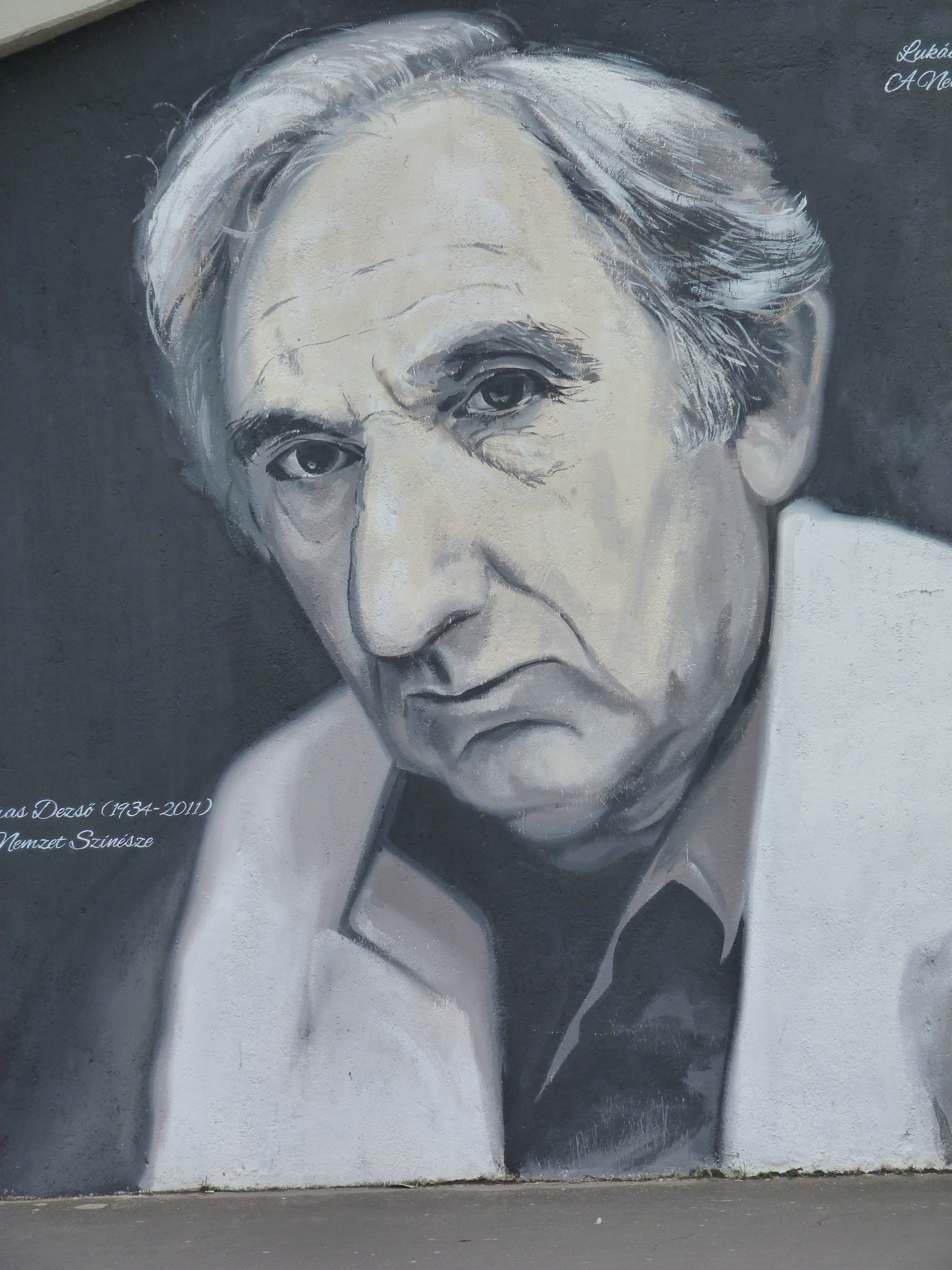
- Born: 9 December 1934; Budapest, Hungary
- Died: 30 December 2011 (aged 77); Budapest, Hungary
- Other name: Dezső Grósz
- Occupation: Actor
- Years active: 1956-2011

Dezső Garas (9 December 1934 – 30 December 2011) was a Hungarian actor, who appeared in more than 145 films and television shows since 1956. He starred in the 1993 film Whoops, which was entered into the 43rd Berlin International Film Festival. Garas died in Budapest on 30 December 2011, aged 77, following a long kidney-related illness.

== Selected filmography ==
- Liliomfi (1954)
- Summer Clouds (1957)
- Adventure in Gerolstein (1957)
- Tale on the Twelve Points (1957)
- The Smugglers (1958)
- Two Half Times in Hell (1961)
- Tales of a Long Journey (1963)
- Lady-Killer in Trouble (1964)
- Car Crazy (1965)
- Football of the Good Old Days (1973)
- Jacob the Liar (1975) - Frankfurter
- A Strange Role (1976)
- My Father's Happy Years (1977)
- Anton the Magician (1978)
- Szerencsés Dániel (1983)
- Before the Bat's Flight Is Done (1989)
- The Pregnant Papa (1989)
- When the Stars Were Red (1991)
- Whoops (1993)
- Perlasca, un Eroe Italiano (2002)
- A Long Weekend in Pest and Buda (2003)
- East Side Stories (2010)
