= Those Who Wear Glasses =

1969 film

- Directed by: Sándor Simó
- Written by: Sándor Simó
- Starring: István Bujtor
- Cinematography: Gábor Kenyeres
- Music by: Zdenkó Tamássy
- Release date: 1969
- Running time: 78 minutes
- Country: Hungary
- Language: Hungarian

Those Who Wear Glasses (Hungarian: Szemüvegesek) is a 1969 Hungarian black comedy film written and directed by Sándor Simó. The film won the Golden Leopard at the Locarno International Film Festival. One of the earliest examples of black comedy in European filmmaking, it is considered a classic of the genre.

== Cast ==
- István Bujtor as Valkó László
- Mari Törőcsik as Mari
- Emil Keres as Ormai
- István Avar as Tibor
- Mária Ronyecz as Jutka
- Tamás Major as Náray
