= Sándor Simó =

Hungarian film producer

- Born: 8 July 1934; Budapest, Hungary
- Died: 4 September 2001 (aged 67); Budapest, Hungary
- Occupations: Film director Film producer Screenwriter
- Years active: 1969-2001

Sándor Simó (7 August 1934 – 4 September 2001) was a Hungarian film producer, director and screenwriter. He produced 25 films and directed a further seven. His 1969 film Those Who Wear Glasses won the Golden Leopard at the Locarno International Film Festival. His 1977 film My Father's Happy Years was entered into the 28th Berlin International Film Festival.

== Selected filmography ==
- Those Who Wear Glasses (1969)
- My Father's Happy Years (1977)
- The Train Killer (1983)
- Whoops (1993)
