= The Berlin Affair =

1985 film by Liliana Cavani

The Berlin Affair (Interno Berlinese)
- Theatrical release poster
- Directed by: Liliana Cavani
- Screenplay by: Liliana Cavani; Roberta Mazzoni
- Based on: Quicksand by Jun'ichirō Tanizaki
- Produced by: Yoram Globus; Menahem Golan
- Starring: Gudrun Landgrebe; Kevin McNally; Mio Takaki
- Cinematography: Dante Spinotti
- Edited by: Michael J. Duthie; Ruggero Mastroianni
- Music by: Pino Donaggio
- Production companies: Cannon Films; Italian international Film
- Release dates: October 1985 (U.S.); 6 November 1985 (Italy); February 1986 (Berlin International Film Festival)
- Running time: 122 minutes
- Countries: Italy; West Germany

The Berlin Affair (Italian: Interno Berlinese; German: Leidenschaften) is a 1985 Italian-German film, directed by Liliana Cavani and starring Gudrun Landgrebe, Kevin McNally and Mio Takaki. Set in Berlin, 1938, it sees the wife of a rising Nazi diplomat fall in love with Mitsuko Matsugae, the daughter of the Japanese ambassador and an artist. Her husband finds out, and moves to break up the affair. However he soon falls in love with Mitsuko himself, leading to the intervention of officials higher in the system. The film is based upon the novel Quicksand by Jun'ichirō Tanizaki.

== Plot ==
Berlin, Nazi Germany, late 1938: Louise von Hollendorf visits her former college literature professor to tell him about her recent life events. The rest of the film is told in flashback with occasional voice-over and on-camera narration by Louise to the Professor.

Several months earlier during the spring season, Louise is married to Heinz, a German senior diplomat at the Ministry of Foreign Affairs. Her husband's long work hours make her feel lonely. She decides to take drawing lessons at the institute of Fine Arts. At the institute, Louise meets a classmate named Mitsuko Matsugae, the young and alluring daughter of the Japanese ambassador. Captivated by Mitsuko's beauty, Louise asks her to model for her sketching practice. Rumor soon spreads at the institute that the two women are romantically engaged. Rather than driving them apart, the rumors bring the two friends closer together and soon they are engaged in a passionate love affair. As Louise confides to the Professor, "One moment we were laughing, the next, we were making love". They have their romantic encounters first at Louise's house and later at Mitsuko's house on the grounds of the Japanese embassy. After spending more and more time together, Louise falls in love with Mitsuko.

Heinz soon grows suspicious of the women's relationship. He not only becomes jealous but also worried that his wife's indiscretions might harm his political ambitions. Heinz confronts Louise about being unfaithful, who denies his allegation, even in the face of clear evidence.

One day, Louise discovers that Mitsuko has had an affair with Joseph Benno, their half-Italian drawing instructor. Louise learns about Mitsuko and Joseph's plan to marry and that the two have spread the lesbian rumors about Louise and Mitsuko to distract people from their own socially unacceptable, mixed-race relationship. Disgusted and disillusioned, Louise breaks away from Mitsuko and returns to her husband, confessing the full extent of what has happened. Heinz is upset, but forgives Louise for her infidelity.

Meanwhile, the Nazi regime starts to eliminate dissidents under the cloak of a morality campaign. Wolf von Hollendorf, Heinz's cousin and a high-ranking Gestapo officer, forces Louise and Heinz to participate in a plot, which uncovers General Werner von Heiden's homosexuality whereby they set a trap for von Heiden at their house by inviting him and (unbeknownst to von Heiden) his lover, a young handsome pianist. At the visit, Wolf exposes von Heiden's relationship, ruining the general's career and forcing him to flee both Berlin and Germany.

One month later, Mitsuko reappears in Louise's life, faking being ill and pregnant. Louise does not believe Mitsuko. Nevertheless, they rekindle their affair with even greater intensity. Joseph Benno, who still has a relationship with Mitsuko, promises Louise that he will not interfere with Louise's and Mitsuko's romance if Louise helps him and Mitsuko in getting married. Louise reluctantly agrees and signs a paper stating that. Benno then uses this written agreement to blackmail Heinz who, with Wolf's help, turns the tables on Benno and has him deported back to Italy.

Heinz is now determined to separate his wife from her Japanese female lover. The two women plan to scare Heinz to accept their relationship by faking an attempted suicide. The plan takes an unexpected turn when Mitsuko seduces Heinz in a ménage à trois. Caught in a love triangle, Louise, Mitsuko and Heinz all grow more and more jealous of each other. Mitsuko, becoming more jealous and possessive, dominates Louise and Heinz. At a dinner, Mitsuko drugs the von Hollendorfs with sleeping pills to prevent them from having sex. Mitsuko uses the ruse to turn Heinz and Louise on each other. By now, their self-destructive relationship becomes publicly known to the Nazi regime as the exiled Benno gets his account published in a Berlin newspaper. To avoid a scandal, Heinz is asked to resign from his post and leave Berlin. Wolf temporarily withdraws their passports to prevent Louise, Heinz and Mitsuko from leaving the country.

Louise, Heinz and Mitsuko hide out in a seedy hotel room to debate their options. However, rather than leave each other, all three drink poison prepared by Mitsuko in a ceremonial rite of suicide and lay down in the room's bed holding onto each other. Some time later, upon awakening and to her bewilderment, Louise discovers that both Heinz and Mitsuko are dead, revealing that she was given a sedative by Mitsuko instead of poison.

At first, Louise thought that by being left behind she was betrayed by both her lovers. However, in the final scene, while finishing her narrative to her Professor, Louise thinks that maybe Mitsuko did so out of loyalty, to spare Louise's life. The Professor urges Louise to write and publish her story, and also passes on his final manuscript to her for safekeeping. Minutes later, he is arrested and taken away by the Gestapo, leaving behind Louise, now alone, who has to decide all by herself how she will go on with her life.

== Cast ==
- Gudrun Landgrebe as Louise von Hollendorf
- Kevin McNally as Heinz von Hollendorf
- Mio Takaki as Mitsuko Matsugae
- Hanns Zischler as Wolf von Hollendorf
- Andrea Prodan as Joseph Benno
- Massimo Girotti as Werner von Heiden
- Pieter Daniel as Edmund Meyer
- William Berger as Professor
- John Steiner as Oskar Engelhart
- Edward Farrelly as Bernard
- Philippe Leroy as Herbert Gessler
- Claudio Lorimer as Otto Bhuler

== Production ==
The original title of the film, Interno Berlinese, can be translated as Inside Berlin or Interior Berliner. The story is based upon Jun'ichirō Tanizaki's novel Quicksand, or Manji, published serial from 1928 to 1930. Cavani was drawn to the novel because of its dramatic intensity and extreme economy, his capacity to bring us, as nearly breathless spectators, inside the meaning of seemingly insignificant details. Manji was published as a serial novel in a literary magazine between 1928 and 1930. Sonoko, the first-person narrator, recounts her own story to a prominent writer as a long monologue that continues the novel itself. It is the story of a passionate love affair with Mitsuko that eventually involves her husband and Watanuki, an impotent effeminate dandy. Mitsuki was actually the name of Tanizaki's third wife. She inspired several of his novels. Cavani brought the story forward in time and set the plot in Germany in 1938.

The Berlin Affair was the first film produced by Menahem Golan and Yoram Globus in Italy for Cannon. It was shot in Rome at the Paolis Studios and Vienna from April to July 1985. Gudrun Landgrabe, one of the discoveries of the New German Cinema, had appeared in Robert van Ackeren's A Woman in Flames 1982, Edgar Reitz’s Heimat 1984, and István Szabó’s Colonel Redl 1985. Kevin McNally, a British actor, plays the husband. Casting the role of Mitzuko was challenging. Cavani went to Tokyo looking for a model of beauty that could balance seductiveness with an iron will. She found it in the 24-year-old actress and pop singer Mio Takaki.

== Release ==
It was entered into the 36th Berlin International Film Festival. The Berlin Affair is available in Region 2 DVD. It has not been released on DVD in the U.S.A.

== See also ==
- List of Italian films of 1985
