= List of Hungarian submissions for the Academy Award for Best International Feature Film =

Best International Feature Film submissions from Hungary

Highlights
- Debut: 1965
- Submissions: 62
- Nominations: 10
- Oscar winners: 2

Hungary has submitted films for the Academy Award for Best International Feature Film every year since 1965, a streak beaten only by France, which has submitted every year since 1956. The category is awarded annually by the Academy of Motion Picture Arts and Sciences (Note: The category was previously named the Academy Award for Best Foreign Language Film, but this was changed to the Academy Award for Best International Feature Film in April 2019, after the Academy deemed the word "Foreign" to be outdated.) to a feature-length film produced outside the United States that contains primarily non-English dialogue. Hungary's submission is selected annually by a Selection Committee of esteemed film professionals.

As of 2026, Hungary has been nominated ten times and won twice, for Mephisto (1981) and Son of Saul (2015).

== Submissions ==
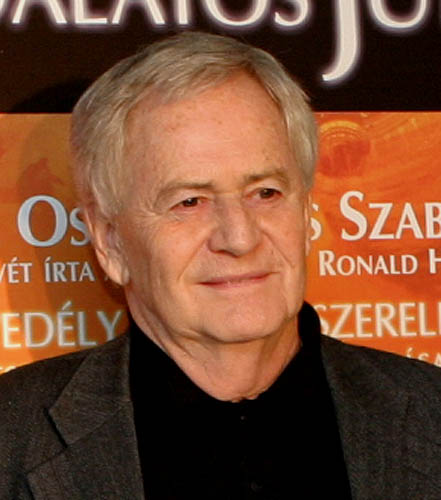
István Szabó directed Hungary's first film to win the award, Mephisto (1981).

Every year, each country is invited by the Academy of Motion Picture Arts and Sciences to submit its best film for the Academy Award for Best International Feature Film. The International Feature Film Committee oversees the process and reviews all the submitted films. Following this, they vote via secret ballot to determine the five nominees for the award.

István Szabó's films were selected to represent Hungary seven times, between 1967 and 1992, more than any other Hungarian director, and four of these films were nominated. Zoltán Fábri's films were selected four times between 1965 and 1978, and nominated twice.

Mephisto (1981), directed by Szabó, and Son of Saul (2015), directed by László Nemes, are the only Hungarian films to win the category.

Hungarian nominated films include: The Boys of Paul Street (1968), Cats' Play (1972), Hungarians (1978), Confidence (1980), Job's Revolt (1983), Colonel Redl (1985), Hanussen (1988), and On Body and Soul (2017).

The Notebook (2013) and Those Who Remained (2019) advanced to the December shortlists, but were not nominated.

Most of the films are primarily in Hungarian (also known as Magyar), although three of Istvan Szabo's films (Colonel Redl, Hanussen and Mephisto) all of which starred Austrian actor Klaus Maria Brandauer, were largely in German, due to its World War II themes. Below is a list of the films that have been submitted by Hungary for review by the Academy for the award.

Year (Ceremony)	Film title used in nomination	Original title	Language(s)	Director(s)	Result
1965 (38th)	Twenty Hours	Húsz óra	Hungarian	Zoltán Fábri	Not nominated
1966 (39th)	The Round-Up	Szegénylegények	Hungarian	Miklós Jancsó	Not nominated
1967 (40th)	Father	Apa	Hungarian	István Szabó	Not nominated
1968 (41st)	The Boys of Paul Street	A Pál utcai fiúk	Hungarian	Zoltán Fábri	Nominated
1969 (42nd)	The Upthrown Stone	Feldobott kő	Hungarian	Sándor Sára	Not nominated
1970 (43rd)	Lovefilm	Szerelmesfilm	Hungarian	István Szabó	Not nominated
1971 (44th)	Love	Szerelem	Hungarian, German	Károly Makk	Not nominated
1972 (45th)	Present Indicative	Jelenidő	Hungarian	Péter Bacsó	Not nominated
1973 (46th)	Photography	Fotográfia	Hungarian	Pál Zolnay	Not nominated
1974 (47th)	Cats' Play	Macskajáték	Hungarian	Károly Makk	Nominated
1975 (48th)	Adoption	Örökbefogadás	Hungarian	Márta Mészáros	Not nominated
1976 (49th)	The Fifth Seal	Az ötödik pecsét	Hungarian	Zoltán Fábri	Not nominated
1977 (50th)	A Strange Role	Herkulesfürdöi emlék	Hungarian	Pál Sándor	Not nominated
1978 (51st)	Hungarians	Magyarok	Hungarian, German, Polish	Zoltán Fábri	Nominated
1979 (52nd)	Angi Vera		Hungarian	Pál Gábor	Not nominated
1980 (53rd)	Confidence	Bizalom	Hungarian, German	István Szabó	Nominated
1981 (54th)	Mephisto		German	István Szabó	Won Academy Award
1982 (55th)	Time Stands Still	Megáll az idő	Hungarian, Russian	Péter Gothár	Not nominated
1983 (56th)	Job's Revolt	Jób lázadása	Hungarian	Imre Gyöngyössy and Barna Kabay	Nominated
1984 (57th)	Yerma		Hungarian	Imre Gyöngyössy and Barna Kabay	Not nominated
1985 (58th)	Colonel Redl	Redl ezredes	German, Hungarian	István Szabó	Nominated
1986 (59th)	Cat City	Macskafogó	Hungarian	Béla Ternovszky	Not nominated
1987 (59th)	Diary for My Lovers	Napló szerelmeimnek	Hungarian, Russian	Márta Mészáros	Not nominated
1988 (61st)	Hanussen		Hungarian, German	István Szabó	Nominated
1989 (62nd)	My 20th Century	Az én XX. századom	Hungarian	Ildikó Enyedi	Not nominated
1990 (63rd)	Little but Tough	Kicsi, de nagyon erős	Hungarian	Ferenc Grünwalsky	Not nominated
1991 (64th)	Brats	Félálom	Hungarian	János Rózsa	Not nominated
1992 (65th)	Sweet Emma, Dear Böbe	Édes Emma, drága Böbe – vázlatok, aktok	Hungarian, German, Russian, English	István Szabó	Not nominated
1993 (66th)	We Never Die	Sose halunk meg	Hungarian, Hebrew	Róbert Koltai	Not nominated
1994 (67th)	Woyzeck	Woyzeck	Hungarian	János Szász	Not nominated
1995 (68th)	The Outpost	A részleg	Hungarian, Romanian	Péter Gothár	Not nominated
1996 (69th)	Vaska Easoff	Haggyállógva Vászka	Hungarian, Russian	Péter Gothár	Not nominated
1997 (70th)	The Witman Boys	Witman fiúk	Hungarian	János Szász	Not nominated
1998 (71st)	Gypsy Lore	Romani kris – Cigánytörvény	Hungarian, German	Bence Gyöngyössy	Not nominated
1999 (72nd)	The Lord's Lantern in Budapest	Nekem lámpást adott kezembe az Úr, Pesten	Hungarian	Miklós Jancsó	Not nominated
2000 (73rd)	Glamour		Hungarian	Frigyes Gödrös	Not nominated
2001 (74th)	Abandoned	Torzók	Hungarian	Árpád Sopsits	Not nominated
2002 (75th)	Hukkle		Hungarian, Czech	György Pálfi	Not nominated
2003 (76th)	Forest	Rengeteg	Hungarian	Benedek Fliegauf	Not nominated
2004 (77th)	Kontroll		Hungarian	Nimród Antal	Not nominated
2005 (78th)	Fateless	Sorstalanság	Hungarian, German, English	Lajos Koltai	Not nominated
2006 (79th)	White Palms	Fehér tenyér	Hungarian, Russian, English	Szabolcs Hajdu	Not nominated
2007 (80th)	Taxidermia		Hungarian, English, Russian	György Pálfi	Not nominated
2008 (81st)	Iska's Journey	Iszka utazása	Hungarian, Romanian	Csaba Bollók	Not nominated
2009 (82nd)	Chameleon	Kaméleon	Hungarian	Krisztina Goda	Not nominated
2010 (83rd)	Bibliothèque Pascal	Bibliothèque Pascal	Romanian, English, Hungarian	Szabolcs Hajdu	Not nominated
2011 (84th)	The Turin Horse	A torinói ló	Hungarian, German	Béla Tarr	Not nominated
2012 (85th)	Just the Wind	Csak a szél	Hungarian, English, Carpathian Romani	Benedek Fliegauf	Not nominated
2013 (86th)	The Notebook	A nagy füzet	Hungarian, German	János Szász	Made shortlist
2014 (87th)	White God	Fehér isten	Hungarian, English	Kornél Mundruczó	Not nominated
2015 (88th)	Son of Saul	Saul fia	Hungarian, Yiddish, German, Polish, Russian, Slovak, Czech, Greek, Hebrew	László Nemes	Won Academy Award
2016 (89th)	Kills on Wheels	Tiszta szívvel	Hungarian	Attila Till	Not nominated
2017 (90th)	On Body and Soul	Testről és lélekről	Hungarian	Ildikó Enyedi	Nominated
2018 (91st)	Sunset	Napszállta	Hungarian, German	László Nemes	Not nominated
2019 (92nd)	Those Who Remained	Akik maradtak	Hungarian	Barnabás Tóth	Made shortlist
2020 (93rd)	Preparations to Be Together for an Unknown Period of Time	Felkészülés meghatározatlan ideig tartó együttlétre	Hungarian, English	Lili Horvát	Not nominated
2021 (94th)	Post Mortem		Hungarian, German	Péter Bergendy	Not nominated
2022 (95th)	Blockade	Blokád	Hungarian, German, Russian	Ádám Tősér	Not nominated
2023 (96th)	Four Souls of Coyote	Kojot négy lelke	Hungarian	Áron Gauder	Not nominated
2024 (97th)	Semmelweis		Hungarian	Lajos Koltai	Not nominated
2025 (98th)	Orphan	Árva	Hungarian	László Nemes	Not nominated
2026 (99th)	Silent Friend	Stille Freundin	German, English, Cantonese	Ildikó Enyedi	Pending

== See also ==
- List of Academy Award winners and nominees for Best International Feature Film
- List of Academy Award-winning foreign language films
- Cinema of Hungary
