= Gudrun Landgrebe =

German actress (born 1950)

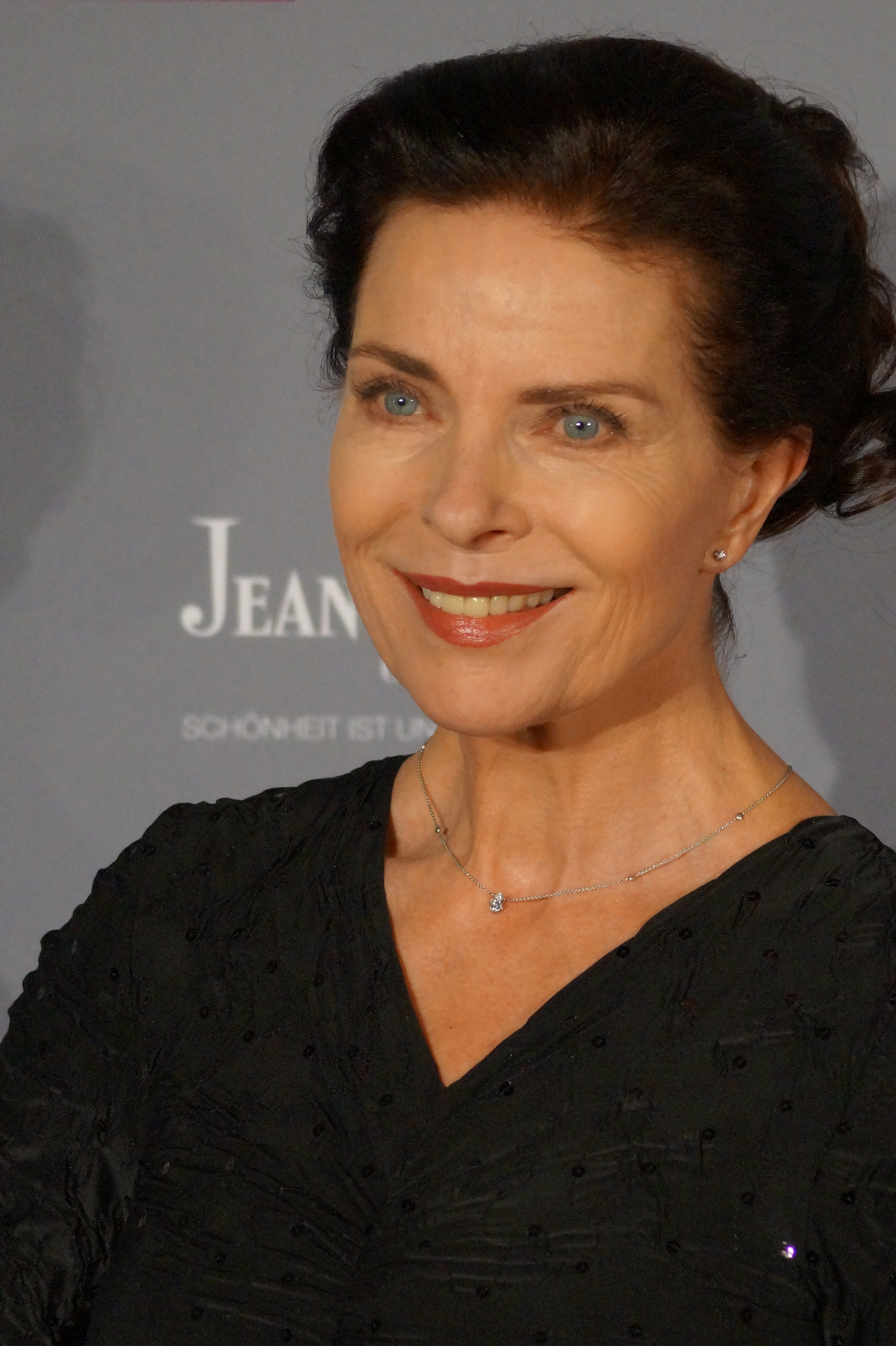
Gudrun Landgrebe, 2015

Gudrun Landgrebe (German: [ˈɡuːdʁʊn ˈlantˌɡʁeːbə]; born 20 June 1950) is a German actress.

Landgrebe was born in Göttingen, grew up in Bochum, and attended theatre school in Cologne from 1968 until 1971. In 1971 she made her debut at Stadttheater Bielefeld. She also appeared in Heimat as the character Klärchen Sisse. Since 1981 she has frequently appeared in German movies - her first film role was in the comedy Dabbel Trabbel. In 1983 she gained international fame in the Robert van Ackerens movie Die flambierte Frau. Further movies such as Istvan Szabo's Oberst Redl (1985), Yerma (1984) and Burkhard Driest's Anna's Mother (1984) followed. In 1985 she appeared alongside Kevin McNally in Liliana Cavani's The Berlin Affair.

She appeared in 1998 in the TV movie Opera Ball with Heiner Lauterbach and Franka Potente. In 1997 she was in Rossini, with Mario Adorf, Veronica Ferres, Heiner Lauterbach, Jan Josef Liefers and Götz George, directed by Helmut Dietl.

Landgrebe has been married to Dr. Ulrich von Nathusius since June 2001 and lives in Hunsrück.

== Selected filmography ==
Year	Title	Role	Director	Notes
1983	A Woman in Flames	Eva	Robert van Ackeren	
1984	Anna's Mother	Marianne	Burkhard Driest	
1984	The Other Side of the Moon	Anna Werneck	Michael Lähn	TV film
1984	Thousand Eyes	Lohmann	Hans-Christoph Blumenberg	
1984	Heimat	Klärchen	Edgar Reitz	TV series
1984	Yerma	Yerma	Imre Gyöngyössy, Barna Kabay	
1985	Palace	Hannah Bauer	Édouard Molinaro	
1985	Colonel Redl	Katalin Kubinyi	István Szabó	
1985	The Berlin Affair	Louise von Hollendorf	Liliana Cavani	
1988	The Cat	Jutta Ehser	Dominik Graf	
1989	Quattro storie di donne	Carla	Dino Risi	TV film
1989	Der Bastard	Lisa	Ulrich Stark	TV miniseries
1989	Affäre Nachtfrost	Anne Seyfried / Friska Pankraz	Sigi Rothemund	TV film
1990	Das Haus am Watt	Lena Golborn	Sigi Rothemund	TV film
1990	High Score	Police-Commissioner	Gustav Ehmck	
1991	Milena	Olga	Véra Belmont	
1991	The Kaltenbach Papers	Eva Sadowski	Rainer Erler	TV film
1992	C'era una volta Biancaneve (Snow White)	The Queen	Ludvík Ráža	TV film
1992	The Shadow	Erika	Claude Goretta	
1993	Private Crimes	Daniela Pierboni	Sergio Martino	TV miniseries
1993	Pauline In Between	Hella Müller-Lalinde	Peter Timm	
1993	Goldstaub	Isabella	Ottokar Runze	TV film
1993–1995	Schloß Hohenstein	Carla Roth		TV series
1994	Dangerous Games	Inga Mahler	Adolf Winkelmann	TV film
1995	Das Schwein – Eine deutsche Karriere	Sibylle Curtius	Ilse Hofmann	TV miniseries
1995	I Love My Daughter's Husband	Julia Struck	Vivian Naefe	TV film
1996	Tresko	Katrin Tresko		TV series
1997	Rossini	Valerie	Helmut Dietl	
1997	The Hours before Dawn	Vera Brand	Wolf Gremm	TV film
1998	Opernball	Claudia Röhler	Urs Egger	TV film
1998	Sugar for the Beast	Mrs. Krieger	Markus Fischer	TV film
1998	Das merkwürdige Verhalten geschlechtsreifer Großstädter zur Paarungszeit	Cornelia	Marc Rothemund	
1998	One Step Too Far	Laura van Monstedt	Udo Witte	TV film
1998	Fever	Vera	Xaver Schwarzenberger	TV film
1999	On the Wings of Love	Lisa	Gabriel Barylli	
1999	Angels' Sin	Julia Beerbaum	Wolf Gremm	TV film
1999	The Millennium Disaster: Computer Crash 2000	Dr. Heine	Anders Engström	TV film
2000	Donna Leon: Death and Judgment	Franca Trevisan	Christian von Castelberg	TV film
2001	Vamp in Negligee	Ellen Schweizer	Berno Kürten	TV film
2002	The Sisters' House	Frances Gray	Rolf von Sydow	TV film
2002	Heart or Cash	Adele Weiß	Michael Rowitz	TV film
2003	Verliebte Diebe	Claire Vanderboldt	Peter Patzak	TV film
2006	A Pirate's Heart	Queen Margaret	Miguel Alexandre	TV film
2008	Rebecca Ryman: Olivia and Jai	Lady Bridget Templewood	Dieter Kehler	TV film
2008	Waiting for Angelina	Blandine Oswald	Hans-Christoph Blumenberg	
2009	Oh, What a Mess	Frederike Norderstedt	Dirk Regel	TV film
2011	Wunderkinder	Irina Salomonowa	Marcus O. Rosenmüller	
2011	Bermuda-Triangle North Sea	Claudia Schelking	Nick Lyon	TV film
2015	Weinberg	Dr. Wieland	Till Franzen, Jan Martin Scharf	TV miniseries
