= Lajos Koltai =

Hungarian cinematographer and director

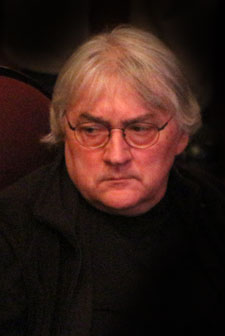
- Lajos Koltai in 2013
- Born: 2 April 1946 (age 80); Budapest, Hungary
- Years active: 1965–2020

Lajos Koltai, ASC, HSC, (born 2 April 1946) is a Hungarian cinematographer and film director, best known for his work with directors István Szabó and Giuseppe Tornatore.

His work in Malèna earned him a nomination for the Academy Award for Best Cinematography.

== Early years and career ==
Born at the beginning of the Cold War, he became interested in film at a very young age, though in Hungary at the time, film containing subversive content was heavily censored. He shot his first short on a Super 8 film camera at the age of 14 and began to draft short scripts and turn them into movies starring friends and family. One year he won first and second prizes at a local amateur film festival, and coincidentally another young filmmaker, István Szabó, was the head of the jury. Koltai graduated from the School of Drama and Film in Budapest, a school known for nurturing such legends as Vilmos Zsigmond and László Kovács.

== Collaboration with István Szabó ==
Still early in his career he gained international recognition during his collaborations with Szabó, namely his film Mephisto, which won the Academy Award for Best Foreign Language Film, and the cult political classic "Angi Vera" by Pal Gabor. At this point the international film community was starting to take notice of these Eastern European films. While Hollywood was at the peak of creativity a decade before after several decades of turning out films that didn't face the same restrictions as in these parts of the world, the Hungarian artistic spirit was beginning to find its place in the world, and many Hungarian directors were confronting truths about their country's tainted Nazi-affiliated history . What followed was several artistic and political masterpieces, the teen-oriented Time Stands Still (1982), a film many considered to be well ahead of its time, Cannes Film Festival winner Colonel Redl (1985), which garnered yet another Oscar nomination, and Hanussen, another political drama loosely based on the rise of Hitler.

In 1995 at the 19th Moscow International Film Festival he won the Special Silver St. George for the Director of Photography for his work on the film Mario and the Magician.

== Work in Hollywood ==
Around this time Koltai decided to make the move to the United States, a dramatic departure for any European filmmaker, let alone cinematographer, though clearly many opportunities lied in the Hollywood playing field. So he joined the American Society of Cinematographers (ASC) and began to compile an impressive body of work, notably Luis Mandoki's White Palace, Wrestling Ernest Hemingway, Born Yesterday, When a Man Loves a Woman, Just Cause, Jodie Foster's Home for the Holidays, and Jack Lemmon and Walter Matthau's last film together Out to Sea. While none of these films had a particularly signature or even beautiful style (save perhaps Mandoki's White Palace), due to the cookie-cutter industry standards Hollywood notoriously places over artistic license, it was around this time that another fateful collaboration took place, and that would be with Giuseppe Tornatore, the legendary director of Cinema Paradiso. The Legend of 1900 would be their first film together, a story about a piano player who was born and raised on a steam boat. Tornatore brought out some of Koltai's best work by allowing an actual creative collaboration to take place on set, instead of the cinematographer just taking orders from the director, and the result is what many (including Koltai himself) consider to be his most beautiful work. This led to a career high for any cinematographer, being nominated for an Academy Award for Tornatore's sweeping love story Malèna in 2000.

== Fateless ==
In 2004 Koltai directed his first film, the Holocaust drama Fateless (Sorstalanság), based on the novel by the same name by Nobel Prize winning writer Imre Kertész. It was released in Hungary in February 2005 with moderate success and it was released in the United States in the fall of 2005. It has had much exposure and success on the film festival circuit premiering at the Telluride Film Festival, Karlovy Vary International Film Festival, Chicago Film Festival, the Los Angeles Film Festival, the Washington Jewish Film Festival, The Boston Jewish Film Festival, the Toronto International Film Festival, the Woodstock Film Festival, the Berlinale, or Berlin Film Festival, where it was nominated for the prestigious Golden Berlin Bear, and countless others. It was also nominated for Best Score (Ennio Morricone) and Best Cinematography (Gyula Pados) at the European Film Awards, and Hungary nominated it for the 2006 Academy Awards, but out of the list of 58 countries as potential nominees for Best Foreign Film, it didn't make it to the final five.

== Recent work ==
Koltai finalized his first American directing deal for Focus Features, on the film Evening, scripted by Susan Minot (Stealing Beauty) and Michael Cunningham (The Hours). Shooting took place summer 2006 in Rhode Island. Actresses Claire Danes, Toni Collette, Vanessa Redgrave and Meryl Streep star in the movie.

Koltai's next projects are Aline & Wolfe, and Spider Dance. The former, which is scheduled to commence principal photography in 2009, tells the story of American writer Thomas Wolfe (1900–1938, Look Homeward, Angel) and his tumultuous affair with the much older and married arts patron and Broadway set designer Aline Bernstein, who is credited with inspiring Wolfe's writing career. Spider Dance is based upon the life of Lola Montez; focusing on her travels in Australia and is set for release in Christmas 2010.

He directed the 2023 film Semmelweis, a biopic about the life of 19th-century physician Ignaz Semmelweis, which Hungary selected to recommend for nomination in the International Feature Film category at the 2025 Academy Awards.

== Filmography ==
=== Cinematographer ===
==== Feature film ====
Year	Title	Director	Notes
1975	Jutalomutazás	István Dárday; Györgyi Szalai	
1975	Adoption	Márta Mészáros	Shared credit with Márta Mészáros
1975	Mrs. Dery Where Are You?	Gyula Maár	
1975	Autó	Géza Böszörményi	
1976	Szépek és bolondok	Péter Szász	
1976	A járvány	Pál Gábor	
1977	Teketória	Gyula Maár	
1977	Rain and Shine	Ferenc András	
1978	Amerikai cigaretta	János Dömölky	
1978	Filmregény - Három növér	István Dárday	With Ferenc Pap
1978	The Stud Farm	András Kovács	
1978	Just like Home	Márta Mészáros	
1978	Angi Vera	Pál Gábor	
1979	Ajándék ez a nap	Péter Gothár	
1980	Bizalom	István Szabó	
1980	The Green Bird	István Szabó	
1980	Harcmodor	István Dárday; Györgyi Szalai	With Ferenc Pap
1980	Színes tintákról álmodom	László Ranódy	
1980	Haladék	Lajos Fazekas	
1981	Mephisto	István Szabó	
1982	Time Stands Still	Péter Gothár	
1982	Guernica	Ferenc Kósa	
1983	The Princess	Pál Erdöss	With Ferenc Pap and Gabor Szabo
1983	Mennyei seregek	Ferenc Kardos	
1985	Colonel Redl	István Szabó	
1986	Hajnali háztetök	János Dömölky	
1987	Gaby: A True Story	Luis Mandoki	
1988	Hanussen	István Szabó	
1989	Homer and Eddie	Andrei Konchalovsky	
1989	Georg Elser - Einer aus Deutschland	Klaus Maria Brandauer	
1990	White Palace	Luis Mandoki	
1991	Mobsters	Michael Karbelnikoff	
1991	Meeting Venus	István Szabó	
1992	Sweet Emma, Dear Böbe	István Szabó	
1993	Born Yesterday	Luis Mandoki	
1993	Wrestling Ernest Hemingway	Randa Haines	
1994	When a Man Loves a Woman	Luis Mandoki	
1994	Mario and the Magician	Klaus Maria Brandauer	
1995	Just Cause	Arne Glimcher	
1995	Home for the Holidays	Jodie Foster	
1996	Mother	Albert Brooks	
1997	Out to Sea	Martha Coolidge	
1998	The Legend of 1900	Giuseppe Tornatore	
1999	Sunshine	István Szabó	
2000	Malèna	Giuseppe Tornatore	
2001	Taking Sides	István Szabó	
2002	The Emperor's Club	Michael Hoffman	
2002	Max	Menno Meyjes	
2004	Being Julia	István Szabó	
2006	Relatives	István Szabó	
2020	Zárójelentés	István Szabó	

==== Television ====
TV movies

Year	Title	Director
1989	Perfect Witness	Robert Mandel
1990	Descending Angel	Jeremy Kagan
1996	Offenbachs Geheimnis	István Szabó

TV series

Year	Title	Director	Note
1982	Schwarz Rot Gold	Dieter Wedel	Episode "Alles in Butter"

=== Director ===
- Fateless (2005)
- Evening (2007)
- Semmelweis (2023)

== Awards and nominations ==
Year	Award	Category	Title	Result
2000	Academy Awards	Best Cinematography	Malèna	Nominated
2005	Berlin International Film Festival	Golden Bear	Fateless	Nominated
1998	Camerimage	Golden Frog	The Legend of 1900	Nominated
2005	Chicago International Film Festival	New Directors Competition	Fateless	Nominated
1998	David di Donatello	Best Cinematography	The Legend of 1900	Won
2000	David di Donatello	Best Cinematography	Malèna	Won
1998	European Film Awards	Best Cinematographer	The Legend of 1900	Won
1999	European Film Awards	Best Cinematographer	Sunshine	Won
2004	European Film Awards	Best Cinematographer	Being Julia	Nominated
