= List of submissions to the 56th Academy Awards for Best Foreign Language Film =

1983 Best Foreign Language Film submissions

Highlights
- Oscar winner: (Sweden) Fanny and Alexander
- Submissions: 26
- Debuts: 1

This is a list of submissions to the 56th Academy Awards for Best Foreign Language Film. The Academy Award for Best Foreign Language Film was created in 1956 by the Academy of Motion Picture Arts and Sciences to honour non-English-speaking films produced outside the United States. The award is handed out annually, and is accepted by the winning film's director, although it is considered an award for the submitting country as a whole. Countries are invited by the Academy to submit their best films for competition according to strict rules, with only one film being accepted from each country.

For the 56th Academy Awards, twenty-six films were submitted in the category Academy Award for Best Foreign Language Film. The Dominican Republic submitted a film for the first time. The five nominated films came from Algeria, France, Hungary, Spain and Sweden.

Sweden won the award for the third time with Fanny and Alexander by Ingmar Bergman, which also won Best Art Direction, Best Cinematography and Best Costume Design, alongside nominations for Best Original Screenplay and Best Director.

== Submissions ==
Submitting country	Film title used in nomination	Original title	Language(s)	Director(s)	Result
Algeria	Le Bal	Le Bal	No Dialogue	Ettore Scola	Nominated
Austria	Tramps	Die letzte Runde	German	Peter Patzak	Not nominated
Canada	The Tin Flute	Bonheur d'occasion	French	Claude Fournier	Not nominated
China	My Memories of Old Beijing	城南旧事	Mandarin	Wu Yigong	Not nominated
Czechoslovakia	Incomplete Eclipse	Neúplné zatmění	Czech	Jaromil Jireš	Not nominated
Denmark	Zappa		Danish	Bille August	Not nominated
Dominican Republic	Guaguasi		Spanish	Jorge Ulla	Not nominated
France	Entre Nous	Coup de foudre	French	Diane Kurys	Nominated
East Germany	The Turning Point	Der Aufenthalt	German	Frank Beyer	Not nominated
West Germany	A Woman in Flames	Die flambierte Frau	German	Robert van Ackeren	Not nominated
Hungary	Job's Revolt	Jób lázadása	Hungarian	Imre Gyöngyössy and Barna Kabay	Nominated
Iceland	The House	Húsið	Icelandic	Egill Eðvarðsson	Not nominated
Israel	A Married Couple	זוג נשוי	Hebrew	Yitzhak Yeshurun	Not nominated
Italy	And the Ship Sails On	E la nave va	Italian	Federico Fellini	Not nominated
Japan	Antarctica	南極物語	Japanese	Koreyoshi Kurahara	Not nominated
Mexico	Erendira	Eréndira	Spanish, Portuguese	Ruy Guerra	Not nominated
Netherlands	The Fourth Man	De vierde man	Dutch	Paul Verhoeven	Not nominated
Peru	Maruja in Hell	Maruja en el infierno	Spanish	Francisco José Lombardi	Not nominated
Portugal	No Trace of Sin	Sem Sombra de Pecado	Portuguese	José Fonseca e Costa	Not nominated
Romania	Return from Hell	Întoarcerea din iad	Romanian	Nicolae Mărgineanu	Not nominated
Soviet Union	Vassa	Васса	Russian	Gleb Panfilov	Not nominated
Spain	Carmen		Spanish	Carlos Saura	Nominated
Sweden	Fanny and Alexander	Fanny och Alexander	Swedish, German	Ingmar Bergman	Won Academy Award
Switzerland	In the White City	Dans la ville blanche	French, German, Portuguese	Alain Tanner	Not nominated
Taiwan	Growing Up	小畢的故事	Mandarin	Chen Kunhou	Not nominated
Yugoslavia	Great Transport	Veliki transport	Serbo-Croatian	Veljko Bulajić	Not nominated
