= Hanns Zischler =

German actor (born 1947)

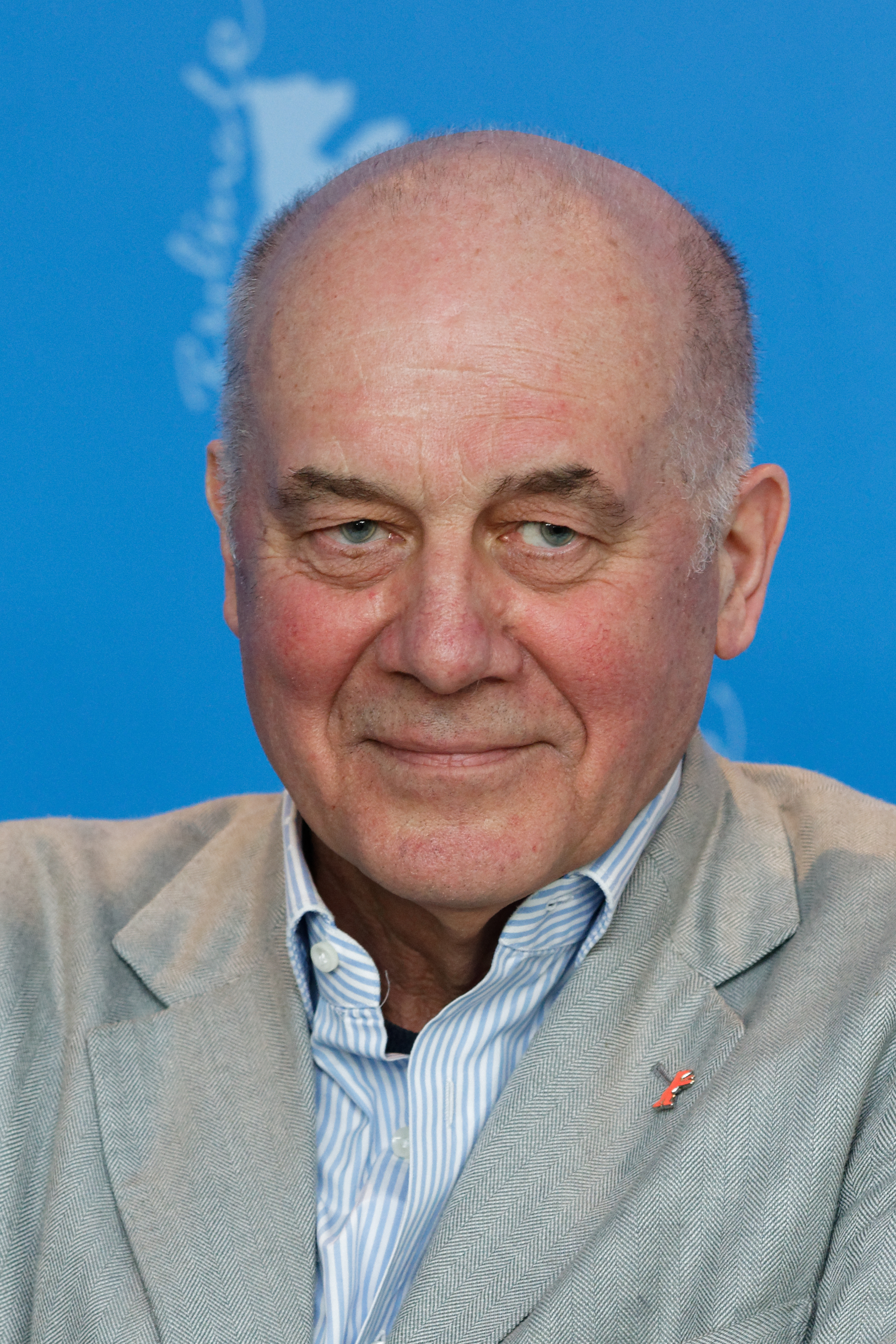
- Zischler in 2017
- Born: 18 June 1947 (age 79); Nuremberg, Allied-occupied Germany
- Other names: Hans Zischler, Johann Zischler
- Occupation: Actor
- Years active: 1968–present

Hanns Zischler (born 18 June 1947) is a German actor, director, and writer.

Zischler started his professional career as a lecturer and translator. Starting in 1968, he worked with the Berliner Schaubühne, where he served as a dramaturge and assistant director to Peter Stein and Klaus Michael Grüber. Zischler has stayed active as a writer and publisher to the present, receiving a number of literary prizes in Germany such as the Friedrich-Baur-Preis (2004), the Heinrich Mann Prize (2009), the Preis der Literaturhäuser (2013), and the August-Graf-von-Platen-Preis (2022).

As an actor, he appeared in Wim Wenders's early films Summer in the City (1970) and Kings of the Road (1976). Since the mid-1970s, Zischler is a regular face in German film and television, usually as a character actor. He has appeared in over 300 film and television productions. Next to the Wenders films, among his internationally known roles are Hans in Steven Spielberg's film Munich and the Russian Mafia's boss Igor Sergeyevich Baklanov in the 1996 pilot movie Der Clown.

He is known for German and Swedish television viewers for his role as Josef Hillman in the second season of the Martin Beck crime TV series. In 2026, he played a leading role as Thomas Mann in the award-winning film Fatherland by Paweł Pawlikowski.

== Selected filmography ==
- Summer in the City (1970, directed by Wim Wenders)
- Kings of the Road (1976, directed by Wim Wenders)
- Les Rendez-vous d'Anna (1978, directed by Chantal Akerman)
- Putting Things Straight (1979, directed by Georg Brintrup)
- Berlin Chamissoplatz (1980, directed by Rudolf Thome)
- Angels of Iron (1981, Wedirected by Thomas Brasch)
- Malevil (1981, directed by Christian de Chalonge)
- Strike Back (1981, directed by Carl Schenkel)
- Domino (1982, directed by Thomas Brasch)
- Doctor Faustus (1982, directed by Franz Seitz)
- A Woman in Flames (1983, directed by Robert van Ackeren)
- Closed Circuit (1983, directed by Rudolf Thome)
- Les Cavaliers de l'orage (1984, directed by Gérard Vergez)
- Das Autogramm (1984, directed by Peter Lilienthal)
- The Berlin Affair (1985, directed by Liliana Cavani)
- A viso coperto (1985, directed by Gianfranco Albano) (TV film)
- Douce France (1986, directed by François Chardeaux)
- Tarot (1986, directed by Rudolf Thome)
- Kir Royal (1986, directed by Helmut Dietl) (TV series)
- The Hothouse (1987, directed by Peter Goedel)
- The Venus Trap (1988, directed by Robert van Ackeren)
- Mon cher sujet (1988, directed by Anne-Marie Miéville)
- Himmelsheim (1989, directed by Manfred Stelzer)
- Der Leibwächter (1989, directed by Adolf Winkelmann) (TV film)
- Francesco (1989, directed by Liliana Cavani)
- La Révolution française (1989, directed by Richard T. Heffron and Robert Enrico) (TV miniseries)
- The Rose Garden (1989, directed by Fons Rademakers)
- Das Haus am Watt (1990, directed by Sigi Rothemund) (TV film)
- Dr. M (1990, directed by Claude Chabrol)
- Europa Europa (1990, directed by Agnieszka Holland)
- Ende der Unschuld (1991, directed by Frank Beyer) (TV film)
- Allemagne 90 neuf zéro (1991, directed by Jean-Luc Godard)
- Salt on Our Skin (1992, directed by Andrew Birkin)
- Abgetrieben (1992, directed by Norbert Kückelmann) (TV film)
- La peur (1992, directed by Daniel Vigne) (TV film)
- Tatort: Bienzle und der Biedermann (1992) (TV series)
- Just a Matter of Duty (1993, directed by Thomas Mitscherlich)
- The Cement Garden (1993, directed by Andrew Birkin)
- Faraway, So Close! (1993, directed by Wim Wenders)
- The Blue One (1994, directed by Lienhard Wawrzyn)
- Charlie & Louise – Das doppelte Lottchen (1994, directed by Joseph Vilsmaier)
- Du fond du cœur (1994, directed by Jacques Doillon)
- Femme de passions (1995, directed by Bob Swaim) (TV film)
- Superbrain (1996, directed by Menahem Golan) (TV film)
- Der letzte Kurier (1996, directed by Adolf Winkelmann) (TV film)
- Der Clown (1996 pilot TV movie, directed by Hermann Joha)
- Die Schuld der Liebe (1997, directed by Andreas Gruber)
- 23 (1998, directed by Hans-Christian Schmid)
- Sunshine (1999, directed by István Szabó)
- Anniversaries (2000, directed by Margarethe von Trotta) (TV miniseries)
- Paradiso: Seven Days with Seven Women (2000, directed by Rudolf Thome)
- Vera Brühne (2001, directed by Hark Bohm) (TV film)
- A Fine Day (2001, directed by Thomas Arslan)
- Beck – Mannen utan ansikte (2001) (TV series)
- Dance with the Devil (2001, directed by Peter Keglevic) (TV film)
- Taking Sides (2001, directed by István Szabó)
- 666 – Traue keinem, mit dem du schläfst! (2002, directed by Rainer Matsutani)
- Amen. (2002, directed by Costa-Gavras)
- Jean Moulin (2002, directed by Yves Boisset) (TV film)
- Ripley's Game (2002, directed by Liliana Cavani)
- Petites Coupures (2003, directed by Pascal Bonitzer)
- Red and Blue (2003, directed by Rudolf Thome)
- Walk on Water (2004, directed by Eytan Fox)
- Post Impact (2004, directed by Christoph Schrewe) (TV film)
- Olgas Sommer (2004, directed by Nina Grosse)
- Munich (2005, directed by Steven Spielberg) as Hans
- L'Annulaire (2005, directed by Diane Bertrand)
- Un ami parfait (2006, directed by Francis Girod)
- March of Millions (2007, directed by Kai Wessel) (TV film)
- Day of Disaster (2007, directed by Peter Keglevic) (TV film)
- Manhunt (2008, directed by Laurent Jaoui) (TV film)
- Flame & Citron (2008, directed by Ole Christian Madsen)
- A Year Ago in Winter (2008, directed by Caroline Link)
- Todsünde (2008, directed by Matti Geschonneck (TV film)
- Hilde (2009, directed by Kai Wessel)
- Abducted (2009, directed by Matti Geschonneck) (TV film)
- Hinter blinden Fenstern (2010, directed by Matti Geschonneck) (TV film)
- Content (2010, directed by Chris Petit) (TV film)
- In the Shadows (2010, directed by Thomas Arslan)
- In the World You Have Fear (2011, directed by Hans W. Geißendörfer)
- Playoff (2011, directed by Eran Riklis)
- Zettl (2012, directed by Helmut Dietl)
- The Case of Jakob von Metzler (2012, directed by Stephan Wagner) (TV film)
- Rommel (2012, directed by Niki Stein) (TV film)
- George (2013, directed by Joachim A. Lang) (TV film)
- Stations of the Cross (2014, directed by Dietrich Brüggemann)
- Clouds of Sils Maria (2014, directed by Olivier Assayas)
- All of a Sudden (2016)
- Crash Test Aglaé (2016, directed by Éric Gravel)
- A Prominent Patient (2017)
- Black Island (2021)
- A Place Called Dignity (2021)
- The Universal Theory (2023)
- Fatherland (2026)
