= A Very Moral Night =

1977 film

- Film poster
- Directed by: Károly Makk
- Written by: Péter Bacsó; Sándor Hunyady; István Örkény
- Starring: Margit Makay
- Cinematography: János Tóth
- Edited by: György Sívó
- Release date: 1977
- Running time: 110 minutes
- Country: Hungary
- Language: Hungarian

A Very Moral Night (Hungarian: Egy erkölcsös éjszaka) is a 1977 Hungarian comedy film directed by Károly Makk. It was entered into the 1978 Cannes Film Festival.

== Cast ==
- Margit Makay - Aunt Kelepei
- Irén Psota - Mutter
- Carla Romanelli - Bella
- Georgiana Tarjan - Darinka (as Györgyi Tarján)
- György Cserhalmi - Jenő Kelepei
- Edith Leyrer - Nusika
- Mari Kiss - Rózsi
- Ildikó Kishonti - Karolina
- Zsuzsa Mányai - Girl
- Edit Soós - Girl
- Katalin Szécsi - Girl
- Ági Szirtes - Servant-maid
- Judit Törő - Girl
- András Ambrus - Major
- Lajos Balázsovits - Szabó
- Zoltán Basilides - Tivadar
- Zoltán Benkóczy - Chief Hunter
- Gyula Benkő - Deputy Homoródy
- László Csákányi - Mr. Kautsky
