= Yerma (1984 film) =

1984 film

- Directed by: Imre Gyöngyössy; Barna Kabay
- Screenplay by: Imre Gyöngyössy; Barna Kabay; Katalin Petényi
- Based on: Yerma by Federico García Lorca
- Starring: Gudrun Landgrebe
- Cinematography: Gábor Szabó
- Release date: 20 December 1984
- Running time: 107 minutes
- Countries: Hungary; West Germany
- Language: Hungarian

Yerma is a 1984 Hungarian drama film directed by Imre Gyöngyössy and Barna Kabay, based on the play of the same name written by Federico García Lorca. The film was selected as the Hungarian entry for the Best Foreign Language Film at the 57th Academy Awards, but was not accepted as a nominee.

== Plot ==
Yerma, a beautiful young woman, lives with her husband Juan in an idyllic Andalusia village. They both long for a child, but Juan cannot fulfill his wife's desire.

== Cast ==
- Gudrun Landgrebe as Yerma
- Titusz Kovács as Juan, Yerma's Husband
- Mathieu Carrière as Víctor
- Mareike Carrière as María
- Mária Sulyok as Dolores
- Róbert Gergely as Leonardo
- Hédi Temessy as Magdalena

== See also ==
- List of submissions to the 57th Academy Awards for Best Foreign Language Film
- List of Hungarian submissions for the Academy Award for Best Foreign Language Film
