= Cats' Play =

- Hungarian: Macskajáték
- Directed by: Károly Makk
- Written by: Károly Makk; István Örkény
- Cinematography: János Tóth
- Edited by: György Sívó
- Music by: Péter Eötvös
- Release date: 1972
- Running time: 115 minutes
- Country: Hungary
- Language: Hungarian

Cats' Play (Hungarian: Macskajáték) is a 1972 Hungarian drama film directed by Károly Makk and based on the novel by István Örkény. It was nominated for the Academy Award for Best Foreign Language Film. It was also entered into the 1974 Cannes Film Festival.

== Plot ==
Giza resides not far from Munich with her son Michael, his wife, and their two grandchildren. Having migrated from Hungary to the Federal Republic, she now finds herself in retirement. Her health, though not perfect, is manageable. She maintains lively correspondence with her younger sister Erzsi, who remains in Budapest, working as a music teacher. Additionally, Giza cooks for a younger married doctor couple. Despite being widowed, she enjoys occasional dinner invitations from her daughter. However, her daughter, Ilona, married to the doctor Joseph, has yet to have children. Erzsi, feeling somewhat redundant, rarely engages in phone conversations with her sister.

Erzsi is on a quest for a specific photo depicting both sisters during their youth. Unfortunately, Giza does not possess the photo and suspects it may have been lost. Erzsi shares tales of Paula in her letters to Giza, whom she has recently reunited with. In the past, Paula had saved Erzsi and her husband Béla from starvation during World War II. Presently, Paula wields a significant influence over Erzsi, persuading her to dye her hair and gifting her a dress. Giza, observing from a distance, feels pangs of jealousy but later apologises in a subsequent letter. On the other hand, Erzsi discloses to Paula in one of their meetings her affection for opera singer Viktor Csermlényi and her deep-rooted passion for music. Erzsi and Viktor have been romantically involved since their youth, maintaining their affair even after Erzsi's marriage to Béla. Only after Béla underwent a complicated surgery did Erzsi sever ties with Viktor. However, they continue to meet every Thursday, where Erzsi prepares meals for him. Their love endures, albeit unspoken.

Accompanied by her music class, Erzsi attends a performance of Boris Godunov. However, she abruptly leaves shortly after the performance commences, unable to endure the music—Viktor had once portrayed the role, delivering one of his finest performances. Upon returning home, she encounters Viktor, who presents her with roses and sings for her. Despite Viktor's insistence that, at 71, he no longer possesses the same vocal prowess, Erzsi finds it disheartening to witness his decline. Soon thereafter, her professional life faces upheaval. Incensed by Erzsi's absence during the opera, her students intentionally perform poorly during a recital in front of the school principal. Consequently, the principal suggests Erzsi consider retirement in the fall. Shortly after, Erzsi accompanies Paula to Viktor's concert. Paula expresses a desire to meet the renowned singer. Later, Erzsi learns from Viktor himself that he escorted Paula home via taxi. They engaged in a lengthy conversation. Jealous and hurt, Erzsi initially contemplates canceling a planned dinner on Thursday but ultimately relents. However, she is informed by Viktor that a rehearsal unexpectedly prolonged, preventing his attendance. Enraged, Erzsi discards the meal. Subsequently, her maid Mousey expresses concern to Giza, suspecting Erzsi may be on the brink of a nervous breakdown. Despite Giza's attempts to persuade her to relocate, Erzsi adamantly refuses, preferring to spend her final days in Budapest. In receipt of a prescription for new sleeping pills from her brother-in-law, Erzsi ceases correspondence and disconnects the phone.

Giza pens a letter to Mousey, informing her of an upcoming surgical procedure in two days' time. Meanwhile, Erzsi initiates numerous letters to Giza, none of which are dispatched. In these missives, she recounts an encounter with Viktor and Paula during a meal, during which she succumbed to rage, overturning the tableware, and leaving abruptly. Viktor remained unresponsive to subsequent calls, and attempts to converse with him at his concerts proved futile. Erzsi confesses her love for Viktor to Giza, entreating assistance in organizing a concert tour for him across the Federal Republic. Following days of lethargy spent in bed, composing unfinished letters, Erzsi consumes an overdose of sleeping pills. Though she collapses, she miraculously survives. A telegram from her nephew delivers the somber news of Giza's passing. Shortly thereafter, Paula dispatches a letter to Erzsi containing the long-sought photo, discovered amongst Viktor's belongings. Erzsi, in a gesture of closure, addresses the photo to Giza before dispatching it at the post office.

== Cast ==
- Margit Dajka as Mrs. Orbán, Erzsi (as Dayka Margit)
- Ildikó Piros as Mrs. Orbán at young age
- Elma Bulla as Giza
- Éva Dombrádi as Giza at young age
- Mari Törőcsik as Maid
- Margit Makay as Paula
- Samu Balázs as Csermlényi Viktor
- Gyöngyi Bürös as Ilus, Mrs. Orbán's daughter
- Attila Tyll as Józsi, Ilus's husband
- Sári Kürthy as Viktor's mother
- Tibor Szilágyi as School director
- Erzsi Orsolya as janitor's wife

== Production ==
Cats' Play is based on the short novel Katzenspiel by István Örkény from 1964, which was also adapted into a play in 1971. Originally, the role of Giza was intended for Mária Mezei, but she withdrew shortly before filming began. She was replaced by Elma Bulla, who had previously portrayed Giza in the theater. The costumes were designed by Nelly Vágó, and the film sets were created by József Romvári. The film made its premiere at the Cannes International Film Festival on May 10, 1974.

== Recognition ==
Cats' Play competed for the Palme d'Or at the Cannes International Film Festival in 1974. In 1975, the film received an Oscar nomination for Best Foreign Language Film.

== See also ==
- List of submissions to the 47th Academy Awards for Best Foreign Language Film
- List of Hungarian submissions for the Academy Award for Best Foreign Language Film
