= Vera Pap =

Hungarian actress (1956–2015)

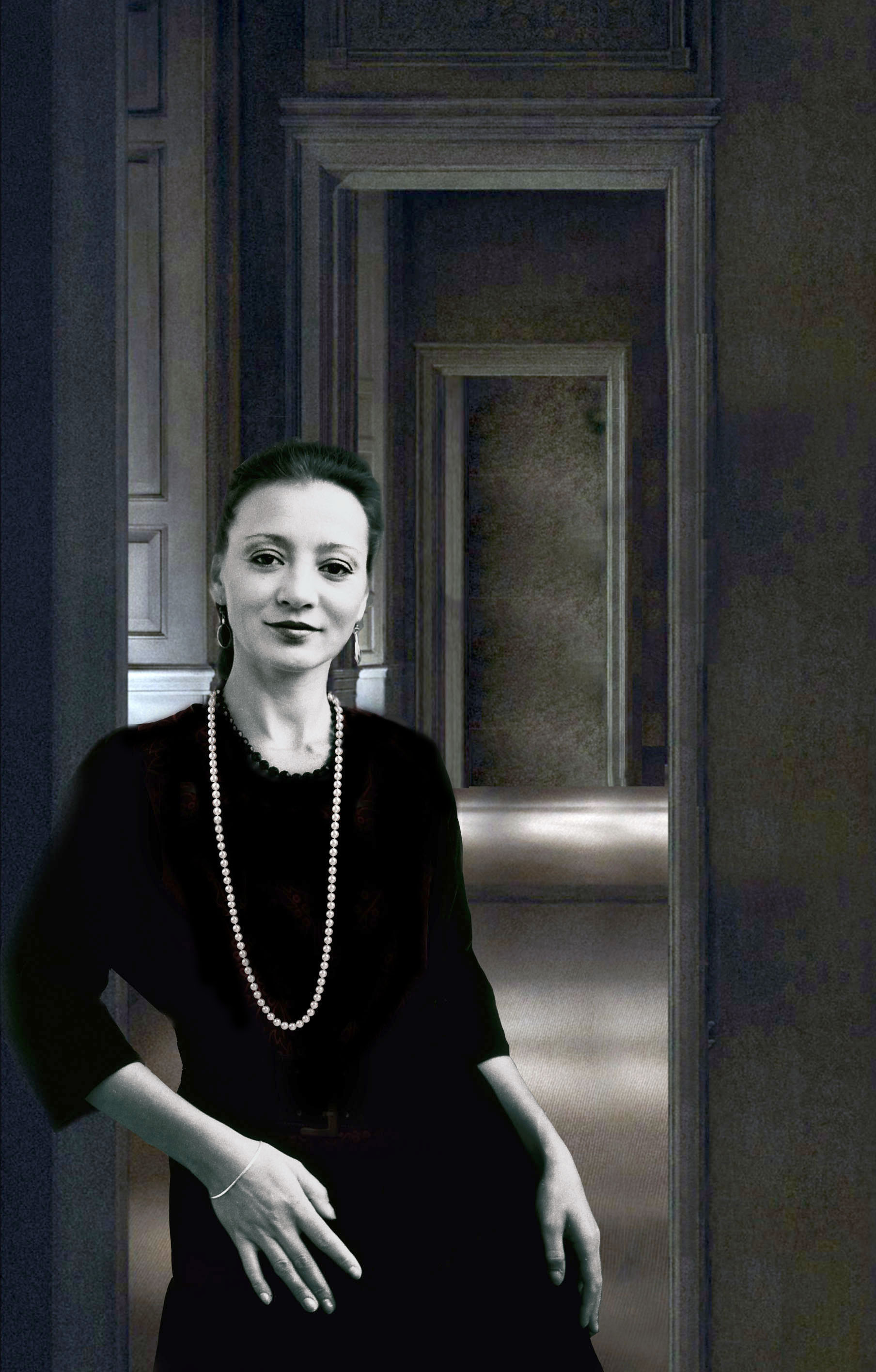
- Born: Veronika Pap; 27 January 1956; Budapest, Hungary
- Died: 9 April 2015 (aged 59); Budapest, Hungary
- Occupation: Actress
- Years active: 1960–2015

Vera Pap (born Veronika Pap; 27 January 1956 – 9 April 2015) was a Hungarian actress. She appeared in more than fifty films from 1960 to 2015.

== Selected filmography ==
Year	Title	Role	Notes
1979	Angi Vera	Vera Angi	
1982	The Vulture	Kati	
1995	The Wondrous Voyage of Kornel Esti		
