= Itt a szabadság! =

1991 film

- Directed by: Péter Vajda
- Written by: András Salamon
- Starring: Péter Andorai
- Cinematography: Sándor Kardos
- Release date: 29 March 1991
- Running time: 104 minutes
- Country: Hungary
- Language: Hungarian

Itt a szabadság! is a 1991 Hungarian drama film directed by Péter Vajda. It was entered into the 17th Moscow International Film Festival.

== Cast ==
- Péter Andorai as Kopa Imre
- Evdokiya Germanova as Duszja
- Sándor Fábry as Figaró
- Károly Löwy as Karcsi
- Sándor Varga as Sanyika
- Ági Szirtes as Kopáné, Marika (as Szirtes Ágnes)
- András Stohl
- András Schlanger
