= The Last Word (1975 film) =

1975 film

- Directed by: Robert van Ackeren
- Written by: Robert van Ackeren; Joy Markert; Iris Wagner
- Produced by: Felix Hock; Wenzel Lüdecke; Robert van Ackeren
- Starring: Delphine Seyrig; Barry Foster; Peter Hall
- Cinematography: Dietrich Lohmann
- Edited by: Clarissa Ambach
- Production companies: Inter West Film; Robert van Ackeren Filmproduktion
- Distributed by: Constantin Film
- Release date: 25 April 1975
- Running time: 96 minutes
- Country: West Germany
- Language: German

The Last Word (German: Der letzte Schrei) is a 1975 West German comedy drama film written and directed by Robert van Ackeren. It stars Delphine Seyrig, Barry Foster, Peter Hall, Kirstie Pooley, and Udo Kier.

== Cast ==
- Delphine Seyrig as Simone
- Barry Foster as Edward
- Peter Hall as Leo
- Kirstie Pooley as Jella
- Ellen Umlauf as Catharina
- Udo Kier as Raimund
- Henning Schlüter as Dr. Schatz
