= The Revolt of Job =

1983 Hungarian film

- Directed by: Imre Gyöngyössy; Barna Kabay
- Written by: Imre Gyöngyössy; Katalin Gyöngyössy; Barna Kabay; Katalin Petényi
- Starring: Ferenc Zenthe; Hédi Temessy; Gábor Fehér
- Cinematography: Gábor Szabó
- Edited by: Mari Miklós; Katalin Petényi
- Music by: Zoltán Jeney
- Production company: Mafilm
- Release date: December 1, 1983
- Running time: 105 minutes
- Country: Hungary
- Language: Hungarian

The Revolt of Job (Hungarian: Jób lázadása) is a 1983 Hungarian film directed by Imre Gyöngyössy and Barna Kabay. It received a nomination for the Academy Award for Best Foreign Language Film.

Set in Hungary in 1943, the film follows an elderly Jewish couple, Jób and Róza, who adopt a troublesome non-Jewish child named Lackó. Their intention is to pass on their wealth and knowledge to him before Nazi oppression reaches Hungary. Lackó becomes a part of the family until the Nazis separate him from his adoptive parents.

Gyöngyössy, speaking at the film's premiere in New York City, expressed his desire for the movie to serve "as a message not only across generations but also across nations."

== Plot ==
Hungary in 1943: The Jewish Hasidic couple Jób and Róza adopt the orphaned boy Lackó, who is Christian. However, due to the prohibition against Jews adopting Christians at that time, the documents are backdated to 1938. Shepherd Jób gifts two calves for the boy. Yet, Lackó, proving to be stubborn and unruly, resists even in the orphanage. Jób interprets this defiance as a divine sign: a spark from one of the calves must have transferred to Lackó, indicating him as the chosen one. Unlike their deceased children, Lackó is meant to survive and perpetuate the family's spirit and faith. However, within the Jewish community of the village, Jób's decision is met with disapproval, with Rabbi Mandele accusing him of blasphemy.

Lackó grows up unaware of God. He curiously observes Sabbath preparations and prayers, foreign rituals to him. When Jób explains that God resides in all things, even frogs, Lackó reluctantly joins neighbor Kati in frog hunting to appease his father. The arrival of a circus in the village introduces the residents to cinema for the first time with The Frozen Child, eliciting mixed emotions. Some are moved to tears, while others resent having paid for distressing entertainment, unable to discern the film's artifice. Maid Ilka and farmhand Jani, who work on Jób's farm, consummate their long-standing love after being emotionally stirred by the film. They subsequently marry, blessed by the village priest.

One day, Jób and Lackó encounter Monk Günther, who begins teaching Lackó about religion. Jób, inspired, starts praying fervently for his son. When rain falls the next morning, Jób interprets it as a sign of divine acknowledgment. However, the joy is short-lived as Lackó contracts diphtheria, a disease that claimed two of Jób's children previously. Desperate prayers from Jób and Róza are answered when Lackó recovers, seen as a blessing by the Jewish community who offer gifts and support.

As Lackó's parents prepare him for their inevitable separation, Lackó is bewildered by their impending absence. At a farewell feast, Jób presents Lackó with his father's knife, a symbolic gesture. The next day, while Lackó is ill, Jób and Róza depart, leaving Lackó with Ilka and Jani. Their parting is final, underscored by the painted Star of David on their former home. Hurt and confused, Lackó witnesses the deportation of his girlfriend Kati and confronts his parents, who coldly reject him. Desperate and alone, Lackó wanders, witnessing the execution of deserters and his loved ones' departure in cattle wagons. In a heart-wrenching moment, Jób insists that Lackó stay behind, awaiting the Messiah. As the wagons depart, Lackó cries out for the Messiah, embarking on a solitary journey.

== Cast ==
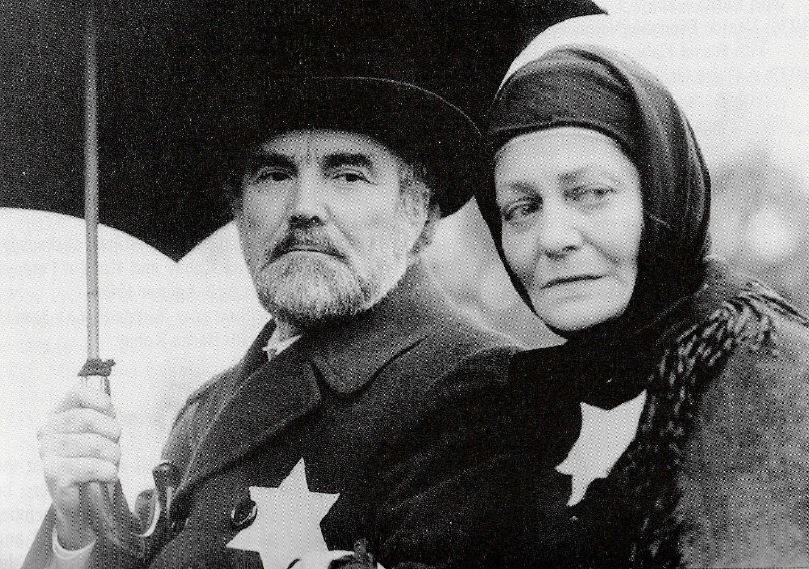
Ferenc Zenthe and Hédi Temessy

- Ferenc Zenthe (Jób)
- Hédi Temessy (Róza)
- Péter Rudolf (Jani)
- Léticia Cano (Ilka)
- István Verebes (Rabbi hangja)
- László Gálffi (Cirkuszos)
- Gábor Fehér (Lackó)
- Nóra Görbe (Ilka hangja)
- András Ambrus (Ügyvéd)
- Sándor Oszter (Árvaház igazgatója)
- Péter Blaskó (Fiatal szomszéd)
- Flóra Kádár

== See also ==
- List of submissions to the 56th Academy Awards for Best Foreign Language Film
- List of Hungarian submissions for the Academy Award for Best Foreign Language Film
