= Himmelsheim =

- Directed by: Manfred Stelzer
- Written by: Fitzgerald Kusz
- Starring: Elke Sommer; Sigi Zimmerschied; Hanns Zischler
- Release date: 2 March 1989
- Running time: 89 minutes
- Country: West Germany
- Language: German

Himmelsheim is a 1989 German comedy film directed by Manfred Stelzer and starring Elke Sommer, Sigi Zimmerschied and Hanns Zischler.

== Cast ==
- Elke Sommer – Helga Muenzel
- Sigi Zimmerschied – Toni
- Hanns Zischler – Dr. Ehrenfried
