= Those Who Remained =

2019 film

- Theatrical release poster
- Directed by: Barnabás Tóth
- Written by: Barnabás Tóth; Klára Muhi
- Produced by: Mónika Mécs
- Starring: Károly Hajduk; Abigél Szõke
- Cinematography: Gábor Marosi
- Edited by: Ágnes Mógor
- Music by: László Pirisi
- Distributed by: Budapest Film
- Release dates: 30 August 2019 (Telluride FF); 26 September 2019 (Hungary)
- Running time: 83 minutes
- Country: Hungary
- Language: Hungarian
- Box office: $119,599

Those Who Remained (Hungarian: Akik maradtak) is a 2019 Hungarian drama film directed by Barnabás Tóth. The film is based on the 2003 novel Férfiidők lányregénye (2021 English edition Those Who Remained) by Zsuzsa Várkonyi. It was selected as the Hungarian entry for the Best International Feature Film at the 92nd Academy Awards, making the December shortlist.

== Plot ==
A 16-year-old girl and a middle-aged doctor connect in Budapest after World War II, each mourning their families lost in concentration camps.

== Cast ==
- Károly Hajduk as Körner Aladár
- Abigél Szõke as Wiener Klára
- Mari Nagy as Olgi
- Barnabás Horkay as Pepe
- Katalin Simkó as Erzsi

== See also ==
- List of submissions to the 92nd Academy Awards for Best International Feature Film
- List of Hungarian submissions for the Academy Award for Best International Feature Film
