= András Stohl =

Hungarian actor

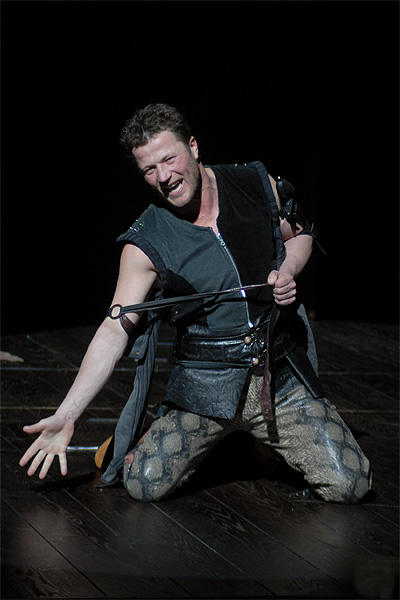
- András Stohl in the play King Lear of the Hungarian National Theatre in 2007
- Born: Stohl András; 23 February 1967 (age 59); Fót, Hungary
- Occupation: Actor
- Years active: 1990–

András Stohl (born 23 February 1967) is a Hungarian actor.

== Career ==
Stohl graduated from the Academy of Drama and Film in Budapest in 1990. He became a member of the Katona József Theatre in Budapest. In 2001 he became a freelancer, after the leadership of the theater decided that his work on television was irreconcilable with the theatre's artistic concept. Since 2003, he has been a member of the Hungarian National Theatre.

== Selected filmography ==
- Itt a szabadság! (1991)
- Perlasca – Un eroe Italiano (2002)
