= Temporary Paradise =

1981 film

- Directed by: András Kovács
- Written by: András Kovács
- Starring: André Dussollier
- Cinematography: György Illés
- Release dates: July 1981 (Moscow); 24 September 1981 (Hungary)
- Running time: 92 minutes
- Country: Hungary
- Language: Hungarian

Temporary Paradise (Hungarian: Ideiglenes paradicsom) is a 1981 Hungarian drama film directed by András Kovács. It was entered into the 12th Moscow International Film Festival where it won the Silver Prize.

== Cast ==
- André Dussollier as Jacques
- Edit Frajt as Vajda Klári
- László Szabó as László / Gérard
- Christian Van Cau as A francia attasé
- Ferenc Bács as Egy magyar ezredes
- Csongor Ferenczy as Egy magyar százados
- Ágnes Bánfalvy as Márta (as Bánfalvi Ági)
- Edit Soós as Virágh néni
- Béla Paudits as Egy francia hadifogoly
