= Bizalom =

1980 film

Confidence
- Directed by: István Szabó
- Written by: István Szabó
- Cinematography: Lajos Koltai
- Edited by: Zsuzsa Csákány
- Release date: 10 January 1980
- Running time: 105 minutes
- Country: Hungary
- Language: Hungarian

Confidence (Hungarian: Bizalom) is a 1980 Hungarian film directed by István Szabó, set in the waning days of World War II. It chronicles the story of two resistance members who are compelled to assume the roles of husband and wife in order to evade detection by the Nazis, despite being married to others. The film garnered critical acclaim, earning Szabó the Silver Bear for Best Director at the 30th Berlin International Film Festival and receiving a nomination for the Academy Award for Best Foreign Language Film at the 53rd Academy Awards.

== Plot ==
During the closing stages of World War II, amidst the siege of Budapest, Kata (Ildikó Bánsági) is intercepted on her way home from the cinema and informed that her apartment is being searched. She learns that her daughter and husband, a member of the Hungarian resistance, have already fled to safety. With false papers under the alias Mrs. János Bíró, she seeks refuge in a suburban house alongside her "husband" (Péter Andorai), a prominent figure in the resistance movement. In their shared quarters, János treats Kata with aloofness, outlining the rules of hiding: she mustn't leave without his consent and is forbidden from divulging personal information.

As the threat of exposure looms and a mutual attraction develops, Kata and János engage in a clandestine affair. János, haunted by a past betrayal to the Gestapo by a former lover in Germany, initially resists his feelings for Kata. However, as time passes, he allows himself to love her. When Kata ventures to reunite with her real husband, she grapples with guilt. Meanwhile, János gradually overcomes his fear and paranoia, only to realize his love for Kata when it's too late, as his actions have irreparably damaged their relationship.

Following the war's conclusion and the lifting of the siege, a car arrives for János, who departs with a promise to contact Kata soon. However, Kata finds herself in a predicament when she must prove her identity before a verification committee. Her original documents were destroyed during her time in hiding, and only János can attest to her true identity. Reluctantly, Kata returns to her husband while János appears at the verification center, calling for his "wife" among the assembled crowd.

== Cast ==
- Ildikó Bánsági ... Kata
- Péter Andorai ... János
- Oszkárné Gombik ... A néni
- Károly Csáki ... A bácsi
- Ildikó Kishonti ... Erzsi
- Lajos Balázsovits ... Kata férje
- Tamás Dunai ... Günther Hoffmann
- Zoltán Bezerédi ... Pali
- Éva Bartis
- Béla Éless (as Béla Éles)
- Danielle du Tombe ... Elza
- Gyula Gazdag ... Egy férfi
- Gyöngyi Dorogi
- László Littmann ... Dr. Czakó (as dr. Littmann László)
- Judit Halász ... János felesége

== Accolades ==
Award	Date	Category	Recipient	Result	Ref.
Berlin International Film Festival	30th Berlin International Film Festival	Golden Bear	István Szabó	Nominated	
Berlin International Film Festival	30th Berlin International Film Festival	Silver Bear for Best Director	István Szabó	Won	

== See also ==
- List of submissions to the 53rd Academy Awards for Best Foreign Language Film
- List of Hungarian submissions for the Academy Award for Best Foreign Language Film
