= Péter Andorai =

Hungarian actor (1948–2020)

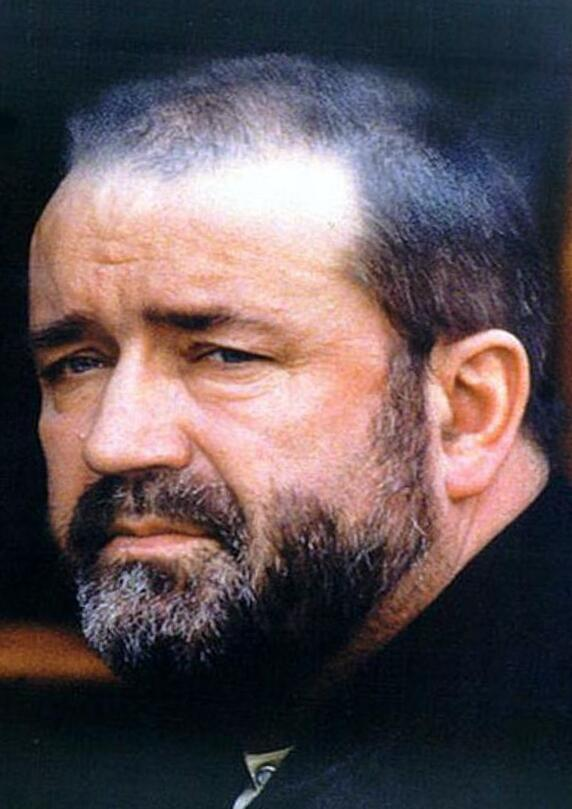
- Born: 25 April 1948; Budapest, Hungary
- Died: 1 February 2020 (aged 71); Budapest, Hungary
- Occupation: Actor
- Years active: 1975–2020
- Spouse: Edit Ábrahám (1983-?) (divorced) (1 child)

Péter Andorai (25 April 1948 – 1 February 2020) was a Hungarian actor. He appeared in more than 90 films since 1975. He starred in the 1980 film Bizalom, which was entered into the 30th Berlin International Film Festival, where it won the Silver Bear for Best Director.

== Selected filmography ==
- Vörös rekviem (1976) - Sallai Imre
- A kard (1977) - Feri
- Ékezet (1977) - Seregi, üzemmérnök
- Riasztólövés (1977) - Csipesz
- My Father's Happy Years (1977) - Varga Ernõ, kommunista
- Amerikai cigaretta (1978) - Jegyüzér
- Áramütés (1979) - Vince
- Szabadíts meg a gonosztól (1979) - Antal, a katona
- Bizalom (1980) - János Biró
- The Green Bird (1980) - Jan Widuchowski
- Utolsó elötti ítélet (1980) - A férfi
- Mephisto (1981) - Otto Ulrichs
- Another Way (1982) - Dönci Horváth - Lívia férje
- Nyom nélkül (1982) - Gyanusított
- Wagner (1983) - Mikhail Bakunin
- Tight Quarters (1983) - Miklós
- Szeretök (1984) - Árkosi
- Eszmélés (1984) - Tányér Imre
- Colonel Redl (1985) - Major aus Wien
- Lélegzetvisszafojtva (1985)
- Falfúró (1986) - Gondnok
- Elsö kétszáz évem (1986) - Betörõ
- Képvadászok (1986) - Gál
- A nagy generáció (1986)
- Hajnali háztetök (1986) - Halász Péter
- Love, Mother (1987) - Csépai elvtárs
- Érzékeny búcsú a fejedelemtöl (1987) - Kemény János
- Küldetés Evianba (1988) - Náci összekötõ
- Hanussen (1988) - Fabian
- Kiáltás és kiáltás (1988) - Tibor
- Eldorádó (1988) - Berci
- Egy teljes nap (1988) - A vak utas
- Before the Bat's Flight Is Done (1989)
- Vadon (1989)
- Die Skorpionfrau (1989) - Felix
- The Pregnant Papa (1989) - Béla, az orvos
- My 20th Century (1989) - Thomas Edison
- Georg Elser - Einer aus Deutschland (1989) - Leibl
- A hecc (1989) - György, Tamás bátyja
- Könnyü vér (1990) - Férfi a hajón
- Magyar rekviem (1990) - Rusznyák
- Itt a szabadság! (1991) - Kopa Imre
- A három növér (1991) - Versinyin
- Szerelmes szívek (1991) - Király, a menedzser
- Könyörtelen idök (1992) - Berkovich szolgabíró
- Sweet Emma, Dear Böbe (1992) - Stefanics - Igazgató
- A csalás gyönyöre (1992) - Feri - Jutka férje
- Goldberg variácók (1992)
- Roncsfilm (1992) - Ádám
- Gyerekgyilkosságok (1993) - Andró Béla, nyomozó
- Vigyázók (1993) - Károly, Éva testvére
- Rúzs (1994) - Arpad
- Utrius (1994)
- Váratlan halál (1996) - (segment "Az ablakok-Levél")
- Csinibaba (1997) - Kúnó Purábl
- The Witman Boys (1997) - Endre Tálay
- Presszó (1998) - Nyomozó
- Simon, the Magician (1999) - Simon
- Sunshine (1999) - Anselmi
- Rosszfiúk (2000) - Kecsõ apja
- Hamvadó cigarettavég (2001) - German general
- Rinaldó (2003) - Lajos
- A Rózsa énekei (2003)
- Bolondok éneke (2003) - Dominik
- The Unburied Man (2004) - Münnich Ferenc
- Rózsadomb (2004) - Gábor
- Relatives (2006) - Szentkálnay
- Lopott képek (2006) - Ottó
- Töredék (2007)
- A Nap utcai fiúk (2007) - Gábor apja
- Az ügynökök a paradicsomba mennek (2010) - Kárász Andor
- The Door (2012) - Mr. Brodarics
- The Notebook (2013) - Plébános
- Pillangók (2014) - Motil
- Argo 2 (2015)
- Aurora Borealis: Északi fény (2017) - ÁVH soldier II.
- A hentes, a kurva és a félszemü (2017) - Kaszala ezrdes
- Zárójelentés (2020) - Oregember az állomáson

== Honors and awards ==
- Jászai Mari Award (1980)
- Hungarian Movie Week Award (1986, 1999)
- Award of The Hungarian Movie Critics (1987, 2000)
- Veszprém TV get-together Special Award (1990)
- Hungarian TV Critics Award (1991)
- Kossuth Prize (1994)
- Order of Merit of the Republic of Hungary, Officer's Cross (2007)
- The Nation's Performer (2015)
- Prima Award (2016)
