= Embers (2026 film) =

- Directed by: István Szabó
- Written by: Christopher Hampton; Sándor Márai (novel)
- Produced by: Tibor Krsko; Ari Lantos
- Starring: Viggo Mortensen
- Cinematography: Elemér Ragályi
- Edited by: Dániel Garas
- Music by: Mychael Danna
- Release date: 2026
- Running time: 97 minutes
- Country: Hungary
- Language: English

Embers is upcoming historical drama film directed by István Szabó is based of 1942 novel Embers by Sándor Márai .

== Cast ==
- Ralph Fiennes as Henrik
- Viggo Mortensen
- Katherine Langford
- Charlotte Rampling
- Louis Hofmann
- Gijs Blom
- Evelyne Brochu
- Zac Wishart
