= Post Mortem (2020 film) =

2020 film

- Poster
- Directed by: Péter Bergendy
- Starring: Viktor Klem
- Release date: 9 October 2020 (Warsaw)
- Running time: 115 minutes
- Country: Hungary
- Language: Hungarian

Post Mortem is a 2020 Hungarian horror film directed by Péter Bergendy. It was selected as the Hungarian entry for the Best International Feature Film at the 94th Academy Awards.

== Plot ==
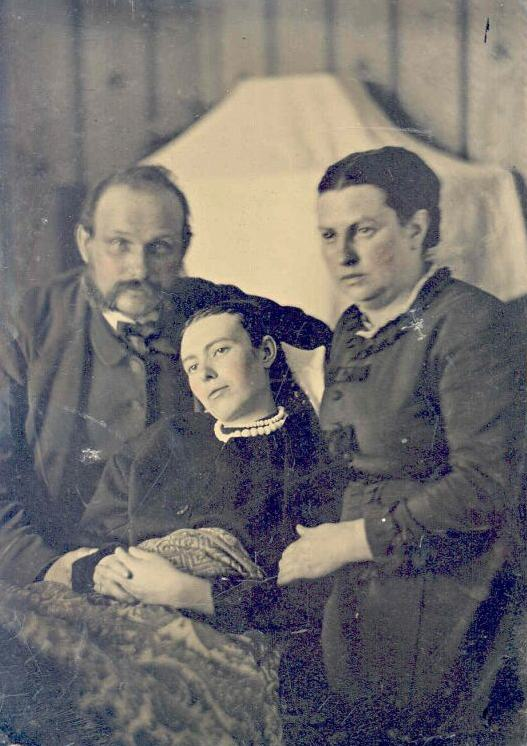
Post-mortem photograph of a dead girl and her parents.

In 1918, towards the end of First World War, on a battlefield, the German soldier Tomás is left for dead after an artillery explosion, being thrown into the mass grave; however, an older soldier sees him still breathing in the pile of corpses and pulls him out of the pile of bodies, where in a semi-conscious state due to the explosion, he had a strange vision: that of a girl who calls him back to life. Six months later, Tomás has become a post-mortem photographer. He offers bereaved relatives the possibility of having a last permanent memory of their dead, through pictures where the living and the dead (made up and recomposed) pose together. Tomás sees how his hallucination seems to materialize in the enigmatic person of Anna, an orphan girl of about ten years of age.

Tomás leaves the travelling caravan of which he is a member, to go to Anna's Hungarian village, at the invitation of some of its inhabitants saying he will be back in a few days. It turns out that in that village and others around it, the frozen ground prevents the burial of the many victims of a dreadful pandemic. The photographer sets to work, taken in by the local teacher Marcsa, but the atmosphere is very heavy and paranoid in such terrible times when, according to the locals, "there are more dead than alive, and the land is overrun by ghosts".

Tomás and Anna decide to continue their investigations on the frontier of the beyond, but events worsen and the dangers become greater and greater... barking dogs, muffled moans coming from nowhere, evil shadows, oozing walls, invisible attacks, duplicities, discreet or large-scale attacks, stratagems to witness the presence of ghosts (ropes, bells, flour on the ground, traces of torches, photographic plate and phonograph, etc.).

== Cast ==
- Viktor Klem as Tomás
- Fruzsina Hais as Anna
- Judit Schell as Marcsa
- Andrea Ladányi as Auntie
- Zsolt Anger as Imre

== See also ==
- List of submissions to the 94th Academy Awards for Best International Feature Film
- List of Hungarian submissions for the Academy Award for Best International Feature Film
