= Ildikó Kishonti =

Hungarian actress

Ildikó Kishonti (26 April 1947 – 30 August 2009) was a Hungarian actress. She also appeared on television.

== Filmography ==
Year	Title	Role	Notes
1973	Régi idök focija		
1977	A Very Moral Night	Karolina	
1979	Tíz év múlva		
1980	Bizalom	Erzsi	
1981	Mephisto	Dora Martin, primadonna	
1981	Boldogtalan kalap	Vera	
1983	Szerencsés Dániel	Singer in hotel	
1984	Lily in Love		
1984	Eszmélés	Vargáné	
1986	Elysium		
1987	Az utolsó kézirat		
1992	Ördög vigye	Max Devil	Voice
1994	Pá Drágám		
2005	Sorstalanság	Vili bácsi felesége	
2005	Az igazi Mikulás	Dönci felesége	
