= Edit Soós =

Hungarian actress

- Born: 7 August 1934; Budapest, Hungary
- Died: 13 July 2008 (aged 73); Budapest, Hungary
- Occupation: Actress
- Years active: 1956–2006

Edit Soós (7 August 1934 – 13 July 2008) was a Hungarian film and television actress. She appeared in 60 films between 1956 and 2006.

== Selected filmography ==
- The Bridge of Life (1956)
- Lady-Killer in Trouble (1964)
- The Healing Water (1967)
- A Very Moral Night (1977)
- Cserepek (1980)
- Temporary Paradise (1981)
- The Train Killer (1983)
