= Manfred Durniok =

German film producer

- Born: 2 May 1934; Berlin, Germany
- Died: 7 March 2003 (aged 68); Berlin, Germany
- Occupations: Film producer Film director Screenwriter
- Years active: 1957-2003

Manfred Durniok (2 May 1934 – 7 March 2003) was a German film producer, director and screenwriter. He produced 27 films between 1961 and 2003. He was a member of the jury at the 20th Berlin International Film Festival in 1970.

== Selected filmography ==
- Malatesta (dir. Peter Lilienthal, 1970)
- The Green Bird (1980)
- The Last U-Boat (1993)
