= The Green Bird (film) =

- Directed by: István Szabó
- Written by: István Szabó
- Produced by: Manfred Durniok; Rolf von Sydow
- Starring: Hannelore Elsner; Péter Andorai; Krystyna Janda
- Cinematography: Lajos Koltai
- Edited by: Eva-Maria Grohmann
- Production companies: Manfred Durniok Filmproduktion; Saarländischer Rundfunk
- Distributed by: Chronos Filmverleih
- Release date: 24 February 1980
- Running time: 94 minutes
- Country: West Germany
- Language: German

The Green Bird (German: Der grüne Vogel) is a 1980 West German drama film directed by István Szabó and starring Hannelore Elsner, Péter Andorai and Krystyna Janda.

== Cast ==
- Hannelore Elsner as Dr.Renate Winter-Ewald
- Péter Andorai as Jan Widuchowski
- Krystyna Janda as Katzka Widuchowski
- Danuta Szaflarska as Polnische Professorin
- Johanna Elbauer as Barbara
- Rolf von Sydow as Deutscher Professor
- Andreas Briegel as Dr. Werner Ewald
- Angela Jaffé as Annette Ewald, Renates Kind

== Bibliography ==
- Hans-Michael Bock & Tim Bergfelder. The Concise Cinegraph: An Encyclopedia of German Cinema. Berghahn Books, 2009.
- Ewa Mazierska & Michael Goddard. Polish Cinema in a Transnational Context. Boydell & Brewer, 2014.
