= Bence Gyöngyössy =

Hungarian film director

- Born: 26 November 1963 (age 62); Budapest, Hungary
- Education: Madách Imre Gimnázium (1978–1980) American High School's Munich International School LMU Munich (1988–1994) Munich Film and Television Academy (HFF)
- Occupations: film producer, film director, cinematographer, screenwriter, actor
- Parents: Imre Gyöngyössy (father); Katalin Petényi (mother)
- Awards: May Ophüls Prize nomination, Germany; Golden Zenit Award for Best First Feature Film, Montreal World Film Festival (1997); Academy Award (Oscar), (Hungarian nomination) – Best Foreign Language Film category International Film Festival, Tokyo; Alexandria International Film Festival – Special Jury Prize; Balázs Béla-díj (2019)

Bence Gyöngyössy (born 26 November 1963 in Budapest) Balázs Béla-díj winning Hungarian film producer, film director, cinematographer, screenwriter and actor.

== Career ==
His parents were Imre Gyöngyössy (1930–1994), Balázs Béla-díj winning film director, poet and Katalin Petényi (1941 –), art historian, film director, screenwriter and editor. He began his secondary school education at the Madách Imre Gimnázium in Budapest, where he attended from 1978 to 1980. In 1980, he moved with his parents to Munich, where he lived until 1997. He graduated from the American High School's Geneva University's international baccalaureate of Munich International School.

From 1983 to 1988, he was a student of communication drama at LMU Munich. From 1988 to 1994 he studied directing at the University of Television and Film Munich (HFF). Since 1983, he has been active in various film and television productions on all five continents. Over the years he has gained experience not only as a film director and scriptwriter, but also as a production manager, film producer and cinematographer. From 1997 to 2001 he was Programme Director and Member of the Board of RTL Klub, and from 2008 to 2009 he was Programme Director and Member of the Board of TV2. He currently works as a film writer, director and producer in Budapest.

== Filmography ==
=== Producer ===
- Száműzöttek (1991)
- Halál sekély vízben (1994)
- Ámbár tanár úr (1998)
- Barátok közt – tv sorozat (1998–2018)
- Hippolyt (1999)
- Meseautó (2000)
- Hal a tortán – tv sorozat (2008)
- Hitvallók és ügynökök (2009)
- Utolsó rapszódia (2011)

=== Director ===
- Idézet (1988)
- Az utolsó Volga német zenetanár (1989)
- A feltámadás lányai (1990)
- Magány (1992)
- Romani Kris – Cigánytörvény (1997)
- Egy szoknya, egy nadrág (2005)
- Egy bolond százat csinál (2006)
- Papírkutyák (2008)
- Utolsó rapszódia (2011)
- A tanyagondnok (2014)
- Janus (2015)
- A nemzet építésze (2015)
- Olasz – magyar örökség (2015)
- Cseppben az élet (2019)
- A feltaláló (2020)

=== Cinematographer ===
- Kulák volt az apám (2014)
- Örökség a jövőnek – Olasz-magyar kapcsolatok (2015)

=== Screenwriter ===
- Havasi selyemfiú (1978)
- Romani Kris – Cigánytörvény (1997)
- Papírkutyák (2008)
- Utolsó rapszódia (2011)
- Janus (2015)
- A Balaton hullámain

=== Actor ===
- Richard III (1973)

== Awards ==
- May Ophüls Prize nomination, Germany
- Golden Zenit Award for Best First Feature Film, Montreal World Film Festival (1997)
- Academy Award (Oscar), (Hungarian nomination) – Best Foreign Language Film category
- International Film Festival, Tokyo
- Alexandria International Film Festival – Special Jury Prize
- Balázs Béla-díj (2019)

== Bibliography ==
- MTI Who's Who 2009. Ed. Péter Hermann. Budapest: MTI. 2008. ISBN 978-963-1787-283
