= The Stud Farm =

1978 film

- Film poster
- Hungarian: A ménesgazda
- Directed by: András Kovács
- Written by: András Kovács
- Starring: József Madaras
- Cinematography: Lajos Koltai
- Edited by: Mária Szécsényi
- Release date: 23 August 1978
- Running time: 102 minutes
- Country: Hungary
- Language: Hungarian

The Stud Farm (Hungarian: A ménesgazda) is a 1978 Hungarian drama film directed by András Kovács. It was entered into the 29th Berlin International Film Festival.

== Cast ==
- József Madaras - Busó Jani
- Ferenc Bács - Bazsi
- Ferenc Fábián - Busó Mátyás
- András Ambrus - Muran Mihály, altiszt
- Csongor Ferenczy - Kisbáró
- István Gyarmati
- András Csiky - Ághy
- Levente Bíró - Kábik, állatorvos
- Marianna Moór - Kati, kocsmárosnõ (as Moór Marianne)
- Erzsi Pásztor
- Irén Bordán - Erzsi
- Ilka Petur - A Busó testvérek anyja
- Sándor Horváth - Kristóf Máté, párttitkár
- Károly Sinka - Schobert
- Nándor Tomanek - Braun, agronómus
