= Mio Takaki =

Japanese actress and singer

- Born: Takaki Mio (高樹 澪); December 31, 1959 (age 66); Fukuoka Prefecture, Japan
- Occupations: Actress, singer
- Years active: 1981 – 2003, 2009–present
- Style: TV drama · movie
- Height: 1.60 m (5 ft 3 in)

Mio Takaki (高樹 澪, Takaki Mio; born December 31, 1959) is a Japanese actress and singer.

== Life and career ==
She debuted as an actress in 1981 with Mōningu Mūn wa Sozatsu ni. Her single "Dansu wa Umaku Odorenai", released in July 1982, was a hit, selling 800,000 copies.
