= András Kovács (film director) =

Hungarian film director (1925–2017)

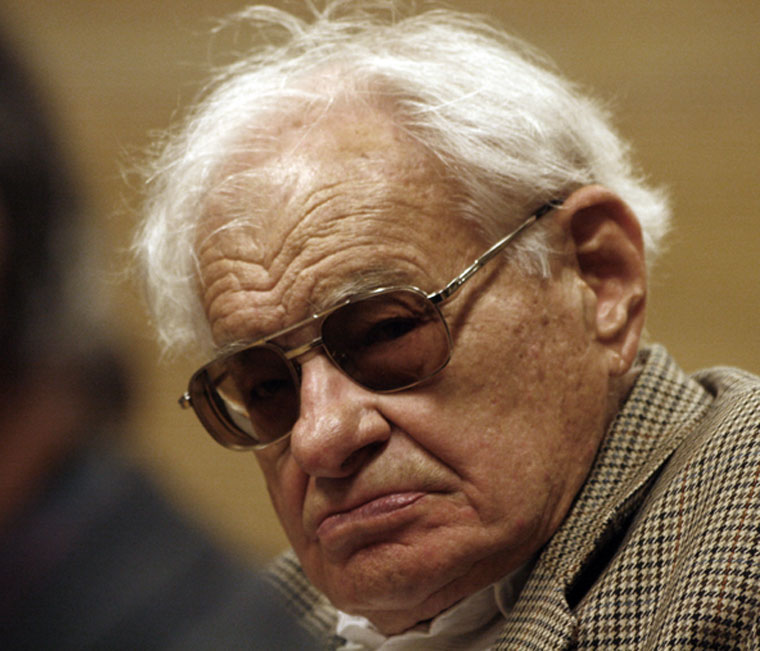
- Born: 20 June 1925; Chidea, Kingdom of Romania
- Died: 11 March 2017 (aged 91); Budapest, Hungary
- Occupation: Film director
- Years active: 1952–1996

András Kovács (20 June 1925 – 11 March 2017) was a Hungarian film director and screenwriter. He directed 30 films between 1961 and 1996. His 1968 film The Lost Generation was entered into the 6th Moscow International Film Festival. His 1978 film A ménesgazda was entered into the 29th Berlin International Film Festival. His 1981 film Temporary Paradise won the Silver Prize at the 12th Moscow International Film Festival. His 1985 film The Red Countess was entered into the 14th Moscow International Film Festival.

He was also a member of the jury at the 5th Moscow International Film Festival in 1967 and the 1976 Cannes Film Festival.

== Selected filmography ==
- Semmelweis (1952)
- Cold Days (1966)
- The Lost Generation (1968)
- Present Indicative (1972)
- A ménesgazda (1978)
- A Sunday in October (1979)
- Temporary Paradise (1981)
- The Red Countess (1985)
