= A Woman in Flames =

1983 film by Robert van Ackeren

- German-language DVD cover art
- Directed by: Robert van Ackeren
- Written by: Robert van Ackeren; Catharina Zwerenz
- Produced by: Robert van Ackeren; Dieter Geissler
- Starring: Gudrun Landgrebe; Mathieu Carrière; Hanns Zischler; Gabriele Lafari; Matthias Fuchs
- Cinematography: Jürgen Jürges
- Edited by: Tanja Schmidbauer
- Music by: Peer Raben
- Distributed by: CineVox
- Release date: 1983
- Running time: 106 minutes
- Country: West Germany
- Language: German

A Woman in Flames (Die flambierte Frau, literally "The Flambéed Woman") is a 1983 German drama film, directed and co-written by Robert van Ackeren, starring Gudrun Landgrebe, Mathieu Carrière, and Hanns Zischler. The film was selected as the West German entry for the Best Foreign Language Film at the 56th Academy Awards, but was not accepted as a nominee.

== Plot ==
Eva, an upper class housewife, becomes frustrated and leaves her arrogant husband. She is drawn to the idea of becoming a call girl. With the aid of a prostitute named Yvonne, Eva learns the basics and then they both set out looking for janes and johns together. She meets a charming man who she falls in love with and goes to his house late at night for a romantic tryst. He turns out to be a gigolo. Consequently, they move into his penthouse, which is large enough for both of them to offer their services separately.

Eva gradually moves into the world of sado-masochism. She finds being a dominatrix extremely satisfying, and begins to take pleasure in controlling others and causing them intense pain. She discovers this in a scene in which a man is hiding under a table. Eva can see that his hands are sticking out from under the table and are clearly visible. Coldly, and with intense inner satisfaction, Eva proceeds to crush the man's hands by slowly walking over them with her stiletto-heeled shoes.

Chris, the gigolo, becomes jealous of her and wants to know what's going on upstairs and how she is making so much money. She tells him it is from hurting men, and that the more she hurts them, the more money she gets. This upsets him greatly. She also becomes jealous of a boyfriend/client he has been seeing/servicing for many years. The scenes in the upstairs room intensify. One day he sneaks up and observes her in a scene dominating a man tied to a chair. He has a look on his face like "see, this is what you truly are," and the look on her face says proudly "yes, this is what I truly am." He tries to whisk her away from all of it, buying her furs, talking about marriage. She tells him that she's been dreaming about hitting him, and in the dream he likes it.

The setting is all there for a romantic ending, and yet, he panics, he takes all their money and invests it in a restaurant that she doesn't want to be part of. She tries to walk out on him, and he gets angry, throws her against the wall, hits her, pours alcohol on her, and lights her on fire.

But the last scene shows her unscathed, happy with her friend the sex worker/madame, and they're getting thrown out of a bar that Chris owns.

== See also ==
- Sadism and masochism in fiction
- List of submissions to the 56th Academy Awards for Best Foreign Language Film
- List of German submissions for the Academy Award for Best Foreign Language Film
