= Edith Leyrer =

Austrian actress (born 1946)

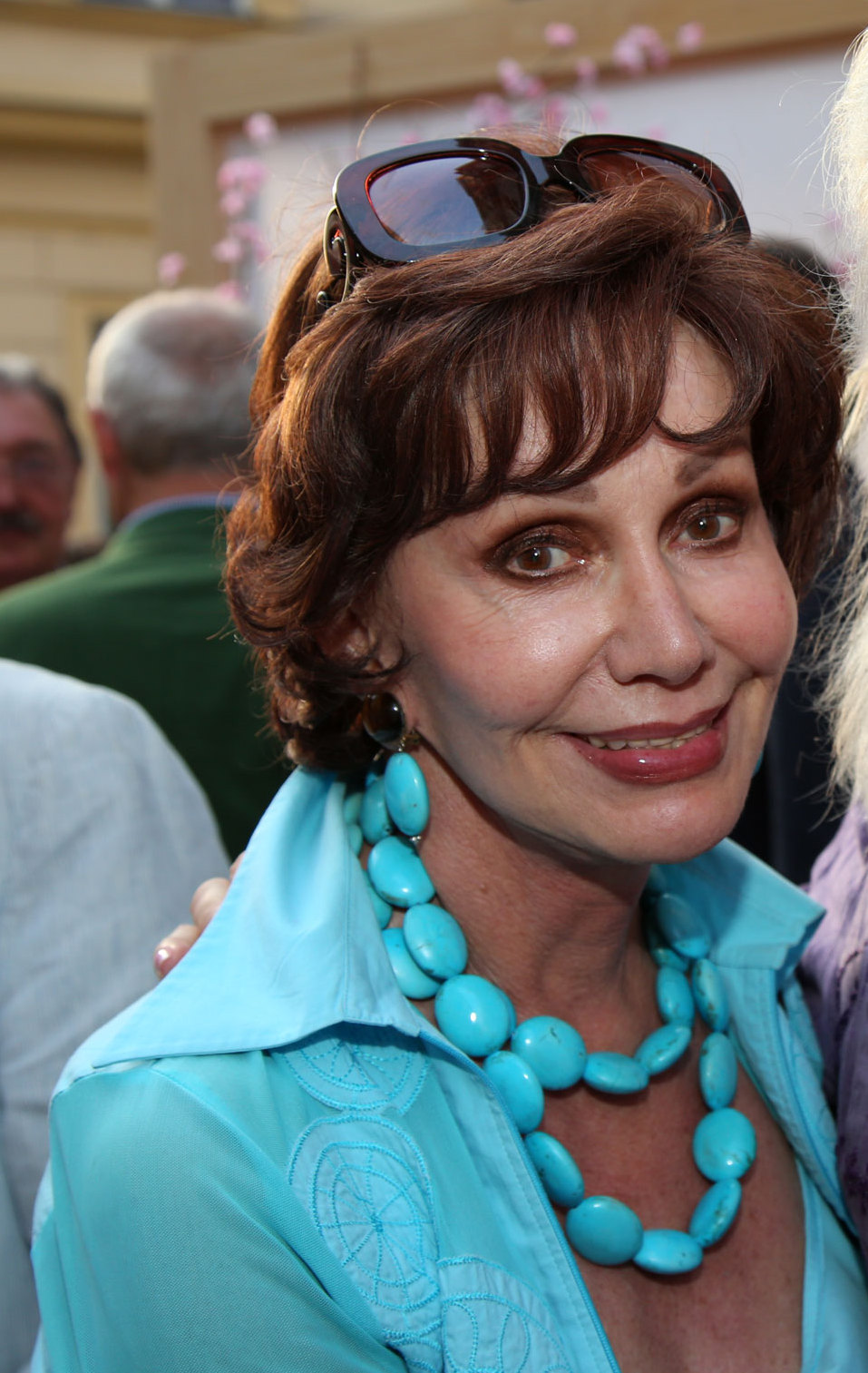
Edith Leyrer (2015)

Edith Leyrer (born 25 October 1946) is an Austrian actress. She has worked in several theatres in Austria and Germany and is known for her cabaret work. She has also appeared in films including the 1968 television film of Robert Stolz's Wenn die kleinen Veilchen blühen.

Born in Vienna, Leyrer told her family when she was 3 that she wanted to be an actress. She studied dance at the Academy of Music in Vienna (now the University of Music and Performing Arts), debuted as a dancer at the age of 15, replacing an injured soloist, and was engaged by the Saar State Theatre at 16 after only a year of theatrical studies. She appeared with Martin Flossmann at the Kabarett "Simpl" in Vienna for 15 years beginning in 1978.

In 2009 she published a joke book with Ferdi Besim, proprietor of a Vienna Oriental carpet business.

In 2004 she was awarded the Goldenes Verdienstzeichen des Landes Wien by the State of Vienna. She is honorary president of Make-A-Wish Austria.
