= Angi Vera =

1978 film

- Film poster
- Directed by: Pál Gábor
- Written by: Pál Gábor; Endre Vészi
- Starring: Vera Pap
- Cinematography: Lajos Koltai
- Edited by: Éva Kármentő
- Production company: Mafilm
- Release date: 1978
- Running time: 96 minutes
- Country: Hungary
- Language: Hungarian

Angi Vera is a 1978 Hungarian drama film directed by Pál Gábor and starring Vera Pap. It was selected as the Hungarian entry for the Best Foreign Language Film at the 52nd Academy Awards, but was not accepted as a nominee.

== Plot ==
Vera Angi (Vera Pap) is an employee of a hospital in post-WWII Hungary. She complains to her superiors about the unsanitary conditions in the hospital. As her proletarian background fits in nicely with the new doctrine of the communist regime, she is sent to a six-month education course. While in the school, she falls in love with the teacher István André (Tamás Dunai), while informers make conditions difficult for the students.

== Cast ==
- Vera Pap - Vera Angi (as Pap Veronika)
- Erzsi Pásztor - Anna Traján
- Éva Szabó - Mária Muskát
- Tamás Dunai - István André
- László Halász - Sas elvtárs
- László Horváth - József Neubauer
- Flóra Kádár - Mrs. János Mikus

== See also ==
- List of submissions to the 52nd Academy Awards for Best Foreign Language Film
- List of Hungarian submissions for the Academy Award for Best Foreign Language Film
