= István Szabó =

Hungarian film director, screenwriter, and opera director

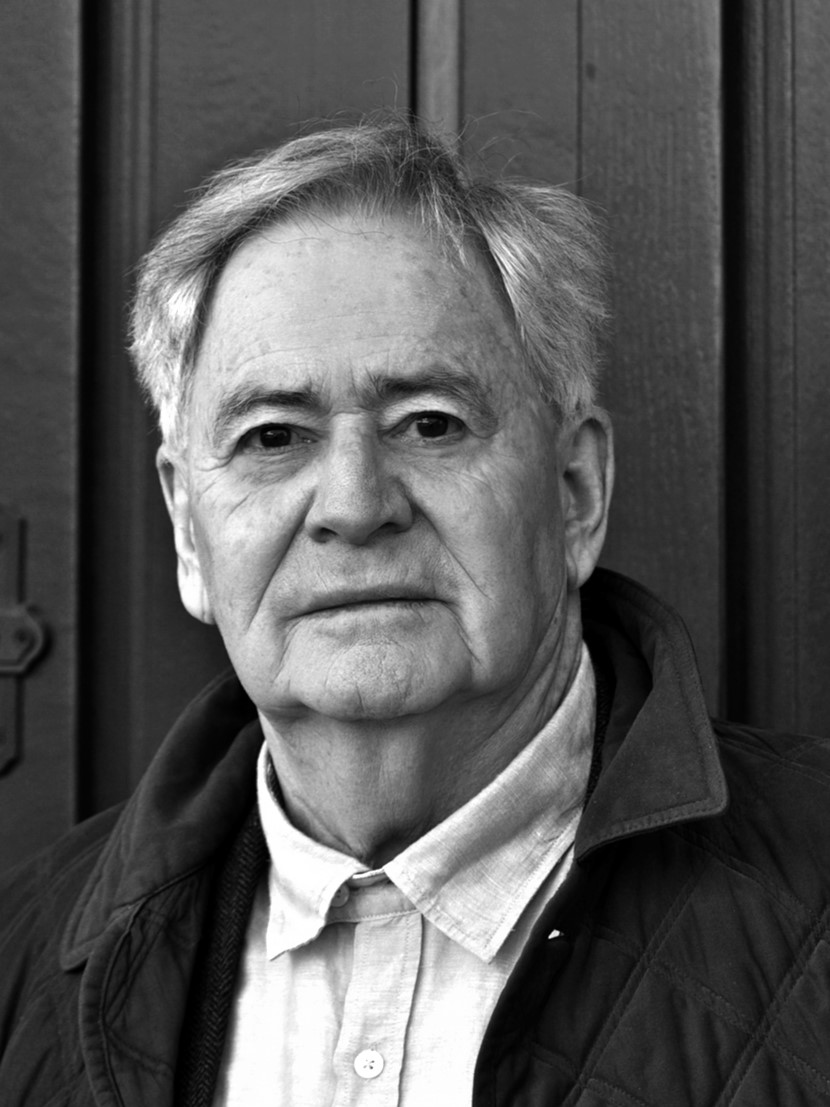
- Szabó in 2012
- Born: 18 February 1938 (age 88); Budapest, Hungary
- Education: University of Theatre and Film Arts in Budapest
- Occupation: Film director
- Years active: 1959–present

István Szabó (Hungarian: [ˈsɒboː ˈiʃtvaːn]; born 18 February 1938) is a Hungarian film director, screenwriter, and opera director.

Szabó is one of the most notable Hungarian filmmakers and one who has been best known outside the Hungarian-speaking world since the late 1960s. Working in the tradition of European auteurism, he has made films that represent many of the political and psychological conflicts of Central Europe's recent history, as well as of his own personal history. He made his first short film in 1959 as a student at the Academy of Drama and Film in Budapest, and his first feature film in 1964.

He achieved his greatest international success with Mephisto (1981) for which he was awarded an Academy Award for Best Foreign Language Film. Since then, most of Szabó's films have been international co-productions filmed in a variety of languages and European locations. However, he has continued to make films in Hungarian, and even in his international co-productions he has often filmed in Hungary using Hungarian talent.

In 2006, weekly Hungarian magazine Élet és Irodalom (Life and Literature in English) published an article revealing that Szabó had been an informant of the Communist regime's secret police.

== Life ==
Born in Budapest, Szabó is the son of Mária (née Vita) and István Szabó, the latter of whom was a doctor from a long line of doctors. Szabó came from a family of Jews who had converted to Catholicism, but were considered Jews by the Arrow Cross Party (Hungarian fascists). They were forced to separate and hide in Budapest sometime between 15 October 1944, when Nazi Germany deposed the Hungarian government for trying to sign an armistice with the Allies, installing the Arrow Cross in power, and 13 February 1945, when the Soviets defeated the German Army in Budapest. Szabó survived by hiding at an orphanage, but his father died of diphtheria shortly after the German defeat. Memories of these events would later appear in several of his films.

In 2006, weekly Hungarian magazine Élet és Irodalom (Life and Literature in English) published an article revealing he had been an informant for the Communist regime's secret police. Between 1957 and 1961, he submitted 48 reports on 72 people, mostly classmates and teachers at the Academy of Drama and Film in Budapest. According to historian István Deák, in only one case did Szabó's informing cause significant damage, when an individual was denied a passport. After the article was published, over 100 prominent intellectuals, including some of those about whom Szabó had made reports, published a letter of support for him. Szabó's initial response to the article was that informing had been an act of bravery, since he had intended to save the life of his former classmate Pál Gábor. When this claim turned out not to be true, Szabó admitted that his true motive had been to prevent his own expulsion from the Academy. Author Anna Porter asserted that "whether this is true or not is impossible to prove as not much has remained of Szabó's file and as revelations about the murky past of prominent figures such as Szabó have become mired in controversy."

In a 2001 interview, Szabó revealed that he believes in God, but considers the subject personal and does not like to talk about it.

== Career ==
=== Pre–1964 ===
As a child, Szabó wanted to be a doctor like his father. By the age of 16, however, had been inspired by a book by Hungarian film theorist Béla Balázs to become a film director. After finishing high school, he was one of 11 applicants out of 800 who were admitted to the Academy of Drama and Film in Budapest, where he studied under Félix Máriássy, who became something of a father figure to him. His classmates included Judit Elek, Zsolt Kézdi-Kovács, János Rózsa, Pál Gábor, Imre Gyöngyössy, Ferenc Kardos, and Zoltán Huszárik. During this period, Szabó directed several short films, most notably his thesis film, Koncert (1963), which earned a prize at the International Short Film Festival Oberhausen. Subsequently he was apprenticed to the head of the Hunnia Film Studio, János Herskó, which resulted in an opportunity to direct his first feature film at the age of 25, rather than having to spend ten years working as an assistant director.

The beginning of Szabó's career coincided with the beginning of a “new wave” in Hungarian cinema, one of several new wave cinemas that occurred around this time throughout Western and Eastern Europe. The new wave in Eastern Europe began against a backdrop of political liberalization, the decentralization of film industries, and the emergence of films as valuable commodities for export to Western European markets. The resulting films were more formally experimental, politically anti-establishment, and, especially in the case of Szabó, psychologically probing than the films of the previous generation. Hungarian filmmakers in particular experienced a significant increase in freedom of expression due to the reforms of the Kádár government.

=== Hungarian films, 1964–1980 ===
Szabó's first feature film, Age of Illusions (1965), is a partly autobiographical film about the problems Szabó's generation had starting their careers, dealing with the older generation, and developing romantic relationships. The appearance of a poster for François Truffaut's The 400 Blows in the background of a scene suggests Szabó's artistic compatibility with Truffaut and the French New Wave. The film won the Silver Sail for Best First Work at the Locarno International Film Festival and a Special Jury Prize for Best Director at the Hungarian Film Festival.

Father (1966) is a coming-of-age story that displays Szabó's increasing fascination with history and his childhood memories. The plot covers events from the Arrow Cross Party dictatorship to the Hungarian Revolution of 1956, revolving around the disorientation and self-awareness of a generation that had to grow up without a father figure in wartime. The main character replaces the image of his absent father with fantasy images that change over time. These events take place during a period of his life when he begins to transition to adulthood. Finally, he is able to face the reality of his situation and comes to understand that he has to rely on his own strength rather than that of an idealized father figure. The film won the Grand Prix at the 5th Moscow International Film Festival and the Special Jury Prize at Locarno, and established Szabó as the most internationally famous Hungarian filmmaker of his time, as well as an auteur in the European film tradition. In 2000, Father appeared as number 11 on a list of the 12 best Hungarian films according to a group of Hungarian film critics.

Lovefilm (1970) focuses on a young man's relationship with his childhood sweetheart, told through flashbacks that include the Arrow Cross dictatorship and 1956, and rendered in an experimental, fragmented form. This experimental tendency in Szabó's films reached its apotheosis in 25 Fireman Street (1973), which began as a short film, Dream About a House (1971). 25 Fireman Street takes place during the course of a long, hot night in Budapest, during which the residents of a single apartment building are plagued by dream-memories of pain and loss spanning thirty years, including both World Wars, the Arrow Cross dictatorship, the Communist takeover, and 1956. While the film won the top prize at Locarno, Szabó was upset by its lack of success at the box office and at film festivals. Attributing this lack of success to the film's complex structure, he decided to give his next film a simpler structure.

In Budapest Tales (1976), Szabó traded his earlier, complex narrative structures, characterized by flashbacks and dreams, for a more linear one. At the same time, he traded the literal representation of history for an allegorical one. The film follows a disparate group of people who come together on the outskirts of an unnamed city at the end of an unnamed war to repair a damaged tram and ride it into the city. Allegorically, the film was interpreted by critics variously as representing Hungarian history specifically or universal human responses to war and reconstruction more generally.

Szabó's first four full-length films featured the actor András Bálint in roles based on Szabó himself. While Bálint also appeared in Budapest Tales, this was Szabó's first feature film that did not contain a significant amount of autobiographical material. He did not make another autobiographical film until Meeting Venus, eighteen years later.

Budapest Tales was even less successful than 25 Fireman Street at the box office and festivals. According to author David Paul, this may explain why Szabó shifted gears even more dramatically in his next film, Confidence (1980), in which historical events are represented straightforwardly, and are filtered through neither memory nor allegory. The film focuses on the relationship between a man and woman who are forced to share a room as they hide from the Arrow Cross toward the end of the Second World War. It garnered a Best Director award for Szabó at the Berlin Film Festival and was nominated for the Academy Award for Best Foreign Language Film at the 53rd Academy Awards.

=== International co-productions featuring Brandauer, 1981–1988 ===
Szabó's next three films constituted a new phase in his career—moving away from Hungarian productions, in Hungarian, written by Szabó alone, and featuring Bálint, and moving toward international co-productions, in German, written by Szabó in collaboration with others, and featuring Austrian actor Klaus Maria Brandauer. The informal trilogy—Mephisto (1981), Colonel Redl (1985) and Hanussen (1988)—features Brandauer in a series of roles based on historical figures who, as represented in the films, compromised their morals in order to climb the ladder of success within a context of authoritarian political power. In Mephisto, based on a novel by Klaus Mann, Brandauer plays an actor and theater director in Nazi Germany, a role based on Mann's former brother-in-law Gustaf Gründgens. The film won the Academy Award for Best Foreign Language Film, and the award for Best Screenplay at the Cannes Film Festival, and greatly increased Szabó's international prestige.

In Colonel Redl, Brandauer plays Alfred Redl, counter-intelligence chief of the Austro-Hungarian Empire who was blackmailed into espionage for the Russians in order to prevent the revelation of his homosexuality. The film won top awards in Germany and the UK, but provoked a scandal in Austria, where several periodicals accused the film of bringing the country into disrepute. In Hanussen, Brandauer plays the real life clairvoyant performer Erik Jan Hanussen, whose growing fame brings him into increasingly close—and dangerous—contact with the Nazis.

=== 1991–present ===
After his Brandauer trilogy, Szabó continued to make international co-productions, filming in a variety of languages and European locations. He has continued to make some films in Hungarian, however, and even in his international co-productions, he often films in Hungary and uses Hungarian talent.

Meeting Venus (1991), the first of several English-language films directed by Szabó—and his first comedy—is based on his experience directing Tannhäuser at the Paris Opera in 1984. Niels Arestrup plays a Hungarian directing the opera at an imaginary pan-European opera company, and encountering a multitude of pitfalls that symbolize the challenges of a united Europe.

With Sweet Emma, Dear Böbe (1992), Szabó returned to a strictly Hungarian subject—this time, however, focused on a contemporary, rather than historical, social problem. The film follows two young, female teachers of Russian facing the obsolescence of their specialty after the fall of the socialist government, as well as a variety of types of sexual harassment in the new Hungary. The film won the top prize at the Berlin Film Festival.

Sunshine (1999)—a three-hour historical epic, and an English-language, international co-production—was viewed by many critics as Szabó's most ambitious film, and, along with Mephisto, his most important. Hungary's Jews had figured in either a marginal or coded fashion in several of Szabó's earlier films, produced during the socialist period when discourse around the history of the country's Jews was more circumscribed. In Sunshine, for the first time, Szabó focused explicitly on this aspect of Hungarian history, which he himself had experienced as a child during the Arrow Cross dictatorship. Ralph Fiennes plays three generations in the Sonnenschein family as they experience the trials of twentieth-century Hungarian Jewish history, from the late Austro-Hungarian Empire through the Holocaust to the 1956 Revolution.

Several characters are based on real people, including the Zwack family, with their successful liquor business, the Olympic fencer Attila Petschauer, and the Jewish police official Ernö Szücs. The film won European Film Awards for Best Screenwriter, Best Actor, and Best Cinematographer. It received a rating of 74% Fresh from review aggregator Rotten Tomatoes.

An example of an extremely positive review was that of Roger Ebert of the Chicago Sun-Times, who called it “a movie of substance and thrilling historical sweep.” A. O. Scott of the New York Times had a more mixed reaction, writing that, by the end, “the movie has accumulated sufficient power and momentum to erase the memory of its earlier awkwardness. It shows such sympathy for its characters, and approaches its subject with such intelligence, that it's easy to forgive the clumsy editing, the haphazard insertion of black-and-white newsreels, and the hyperventilating sexual ardor that seems to be a Sors family curse.”

In Taking Sides (2001), Szabó returned to thematic territory he had explored in Mephisto. Stellan Skarsgård plays real life German conductor Wilhelm Furtwängler, and Harvey Keitel a U.S. Army investigator interrogating Furtwängler about his collaboration with the Nazis. The film won several awards at the Mar del Plata Film Festival in Argentina, including Best Director.

Being Julia (2004), based on a novel by W. Somerset Maugham, stars Annette Bening as a famous British actress experiencing a series of romantic and professional rivalries. Bening won a Golden Globe Award for her performance.

In 2005, Szabó was awarded the Lifetime Achievement Award at the 27th Moscow International Film Festival.

Rokonok (2006) was a Hungarian production based on a 1932 novel by Zsigmond Móricz about political corruption. Sándor Csányi plays a newly elected attorney general whose relatives (rokonok) come out of the woodwork looking for favors. It was entered into the 28th Moscow International Film Festival.

The Door (2012), an English language production based on a Hungarian novel by Magda Szabó (no relation), focuses on the relationship between an affluent novelist (Martina Gedeck) and her poor, mysterious maid (Helen Mirren). It opened the 13th Tbilisi International Film Festival and won the Michael Curtiz Audience Award at the Hungarian Film Festival of Los Angeles.

Szabó's frequent collaborators have included actors András Bálint, Klaus Maria Brandauer, Péter Andorai, and Ildikó Bánsági; cinematographer Lajos Koltai; and screenwriters Péter Dobai and Andrea Vészits.

=== Style and Themes ===
Several interconnected themes run through Szabó's films, the most common being the relationship between the personal and the political or historical. On the personal level, his first three feature films deal with coming of age issues, but political/historical events form the backdrop of these issues and continually rupture the attempts of the characters to lead their private lives. In an interview in 2008, Szabó said, “My mother once told me, 'We had a nice childhood and our youth was beautiful, but our life was destroyed by politics and history.'” The political/historical events most commonly depicted are the dominant traumatic events of mid-20th century Hungarian and Central European history—Nazism, the Second World War, and, in Hungary—or, more accurately, Budapest—the Arrow Cross dictatorship and the Holocaust, the Communist takeover, and the 1956 Revolution. Szabó himself has frequently referred to this theme as the search for security.

A related theme is the moral compromises individuals make in order to succeed in immoral political systems. In an interview about Taking Sides, Szabó said, “I don't think that life is possible without making compromises. The question is only one of limits: how far to go. When one crosses the line, then the compromise starts to be a bad, even deadly, one.” This theme is dominant in the Brandauer trilogy and, as Istvan Deak points out, may be related to Szabó's own collaboration with the Communist secret police.

Another closely related theme is the arts—most often theater, but also music and film itself. In several of Szabó's films—most famously in Mephisto—artists become caught up in conflicts around politics, role-playing, and identity.

Szabó's early films—culminating in Lovefilm and 25 Fireman Street—were influenced by the French New Wave in their experimentation with flashbacks, dream sequences, and unconventional narrative structures built on these techniques.

Szabó emphasizes iconography in his films, insofar as he tends to invest certain objects and places with symbolic meaning. Tram cars play this role in many of his films, and one becomes the central image in Budapest Tales. Budapest itself plays an important role in many of his films, including scenes of the Danube and of buildings Szabó lived in when he was a child.

Acting also plays a key role in Szabó's films, as he values psychological complexity in his central characters. In his first several features, he tended to use the same lead actors over and over—first András Bálint, then Klaus Maria Brandauer. Consistent with this focus on acting, he frequently employs long close-up shots to emphasize the play of emotions on the faces of his characters.

Other work

In addition to writing and directing films, Szabó has also served in a variety of other capacities in the film industry, including writing and directing television movies and episodes, short films, and documentaries, as well as serving as assistant director, screenwriter, producer, and actor in films directed by others. In 1969, he was a member of the jury at the 6th Moscow International Film Festival.

Szabó has directed several operas, including Tannhäuser in Paris, Boris Godunov in Leipzig, Il Trovatore in Vienna, and Three Sisters in Budapest. He has taught at film schools in Budapest, London, Berlin, and Vienna. In 1989, he was one of the founding members of the European Film Academy, and, in 1992, of the Széchenyi Academy of Literature and Arts.

== Filmography ==
=== Film ===
Year	Title	Country	Length	Director	Writer	Other
1959	A Hetedik napon	Hungary	Short	Yes	Yes	
1960	Bill Poster	Hungary	Short	Yes	Yes	
1961	Variációk egy témára	Hungary	Short	Yes	Yes	
1962	Délibáb minden mennyiségben	Hungary	Short		Yes	
1963	Párbeszéd	Hungary	Feature		Yes	Assistant Director
1963	You	Hungary	Short	Yes	Yes	Producer
1963	Koncert	Hungary	Short	Yes	Yes	
1965	Artists	Hungary	Short		Yes	
1965	Traffic-Rule Tale for Children	Hungary	Short	Yes	Yes	
1965	Age of Illusions	Hungary	Feature	Yes	Yes	
1966	Children's Sicknesses	Hungary	Feature			Script Editor
1966	Father	Hungary	Feature	Yes	Yes	Actor: voice of film director
1967	Red Letter Days	Hungary	Feature			Script Editor
1967	Piety	Hungary	Short	Yes	Yes	
1970	Lovefilm	Hungary	Feature	Yes	Yes	
1971	Budapest, Why I Love It (collection of short films: “The Square,” “A Mirror,” “Danube, Fishes, Birds,” “Portrait of a Girl,” “Dream About a House”)	Hungary	Short	Yes	Yes	
1973	25 Fireman Street	Hungary	Feature	Yes	Yes	
1977	Várostérkép	Hungary	Short	Yes	Yes	
1977	Budapest Tales	Hungary	Feature	Yes	Yes	
1978	Places on Sunday	Hungary	Short	Yes	Yes	
1978	The Hungarians	Hungary	Feature			Actor: Abris Kondor
1980	Bálint Fábián Meets God	Hungary	Feature			Actor: András
1980	Confidence	Hungary	Feature	Yes	Yes	
1980	The Green Bird	West Germany	Feature	Yes	Yes	
1981	Mephisto	West Germany, Hungary, Austria	Feature	Yes	Yes	Actor: Theatre party attendant
1985	Colonel Redl	Yugoslavia, Hungary, Austria, West Germany	Feature	Yes	Yes	
1987	Laura	Hungary	Feature			Consultant
1988	Hanussen	Hungary, West Germany, Austria	Feature	Yes	Yes	
1989	Túsztörténet	Hungary	Feature			Actor: Fõorvos
1990	Eszterkönyv	Hungary	Feature			Artistic Producer
1991	Meeting Venus	UK, Japan, USA	Feature	Yes	Yes	
1991	Sweet Emma, Dear Böbe – Sketches, Nudes	Hungary	Feature	Yes	Yes	
1993	Prinzenbad	Germany, Hungary	Feature			Producer
1994	Utrius	Hungary	Feature			Actor
1995	Esti Kornél csodálatos utazása	Hungary	Feature			Consultant
1996	A csónak biztonsága	Hungary	Short	Yes		
1997	Franciska vasárnapjai	Hungary	Feature			Actor: Orvos
1998	Place Vendôme	France	Feature			Actor: Charlie Rosen
1999	Sunshine	Germany, Austria, Canada, Hungary	Feature	Yes	Yes	Lyrics: “Please God May We Always Go on Singing”
2001	Taking Sides	France, UK, Germany, Austria	Feature	Yes		Actor: Passenger on train
2002	Ten Minutes Older: The Cello (segment: “Ten Minutes After”)	UK, Germany, France	Feature	Yes	Yes	
2003	The Colour of Happiness	Hungary	Feature			Consultant
2004	Európából Európába (segment 2)	Hungary	Short	Yes		
2004	Being Julia	Canada, USA, Hungary, UK	Feature	Yes		
2004	Shem	Israel, UK	Feature			Actor: Elijah
2006	Rokonok	Hungary	Feature	Yes	Yes	Actor: voice of Mr. Menzel
2006	I Served the King of England	Czech Republic, Slovakia	Feature			Actor: Stock marketeer
2012	The Door	Hungary	Feature	Yes	Yes	
2020	Zárójelentés	Hungary	Feature	Yes	Yes	
TBA	Embers	Hungary	Feature	Yes	TBA	Filming

=== Television ===
Year	Title	Country	Length	Director	Writer
1968	Bors (episode: “Vesztegzár a határon”)	Hungary	Feature	Yes	
1974	Ösbemutató	Hungary	Feature	Yes	Yes
1982	Levél apámhoz (Letter to my Father)	Hungary	Feature	Yes	Yes
1983	Cats' Play	West Germany, Canada	Feature	Yes	
1984	Bali	West Germany, Austria	Feature	Yes	
1984	Isten teremtményei		Feature	Yes	Yes
1996	Offenbachs Geheimnis (includes complete performances of Les deux aveugles and Croquefer, ou Le dernier des paladins)	Germany, France, Hungary	Feature	Yes	

=== Appearances in documentaries ===
Year	Title	Country
1982	Történetek a magyar filmröl	Hungary
1998	TV a város szélén (episode 1.1)	Hungary
2002	Simó Sándor	Hungary
2004	Gero von Boehm begegnet...	Germany
2005	Into the Night with...	Germany, France
2006	The Outsider	Canada
2007	The Fallen Vampire	France, Romania, Austria, Germany, Netherlands
2007	Close-up (episode: “Bela Lugosi: Dracula's Dubbelganger”)	Netherlands, Germany, Belgium
2008	Szakácskirály	Hungary
2010	Sodankylä ikuisesti	Finland

== See also ==
- Cinema of Hungary
- Culture of Hungary
- Jacob Sager Weinstein
