= Gábor Szabó (cinematographer) =

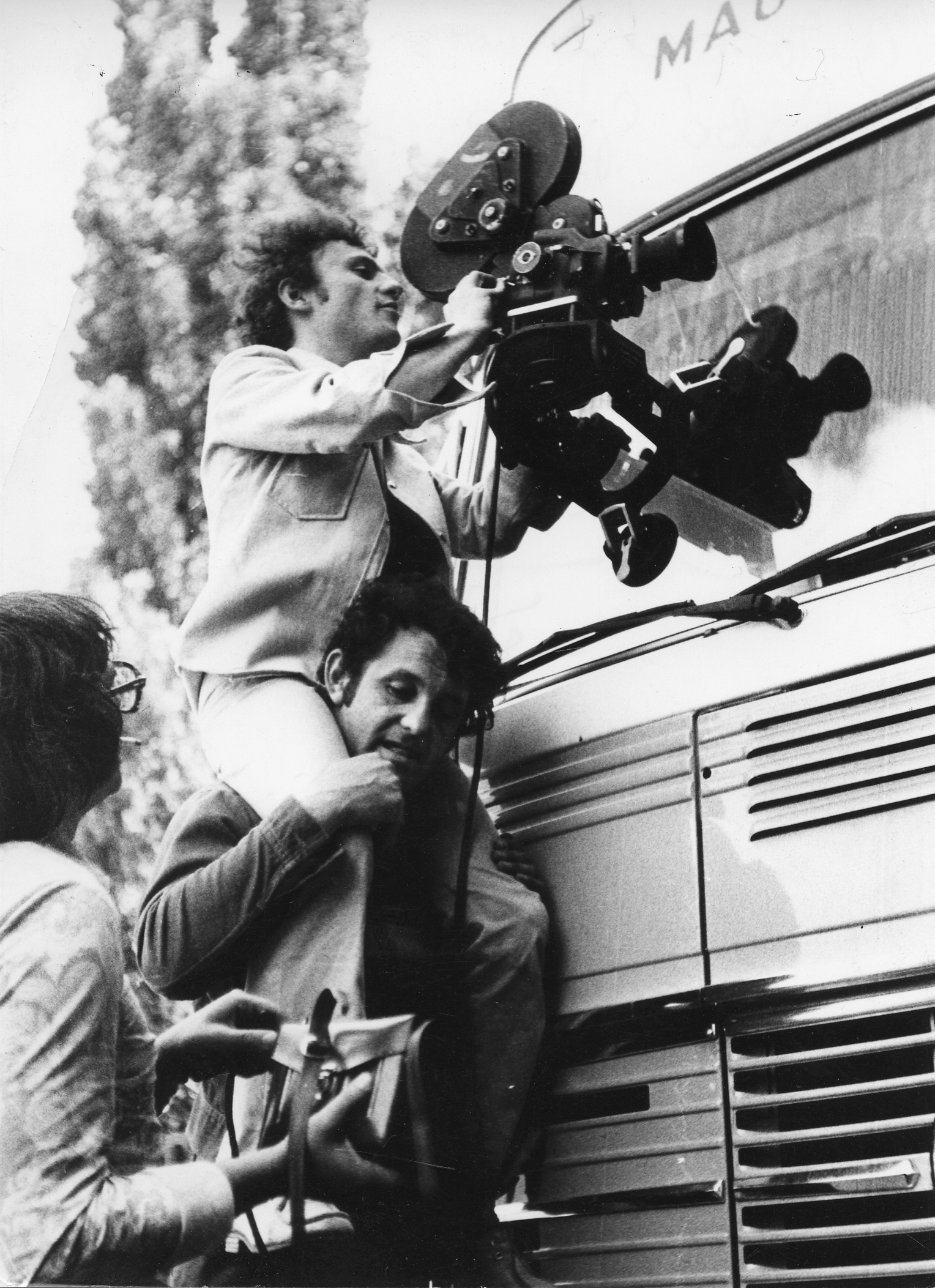
Gábor Szabó

Gábor Szabó, HSC (born 24 October 1950) is a Hungarian cinematographer.

His father, Árpád Szabó, was a cinematographer of documentary and short films and his mother, Anna Szántó, a dubbing director. He received his diploma in 1975, from the Hungarian University of Film and Theatre, where he began teaching almost instantly afterwards.

Szabó was the cinematographer of the cinematic picture The Revolt of Job, nominated for an Academy Award for Best Foreign Language Film in 1984. His other work, Meteo, shot at the time of the change of regimes in Hungary, was shown in cinemas for years, becoming a cult classic of the 1990s. Vilmos Zsigmond, ASC, Oscar winning cinematographer, chose to work with Szabó on his only directorial work, a movie with Liv Ullmann and Michael York. He has shot several features in the Netherlands, the best known of which is Tirza, which was the Dutch nominee for the 2011 Oscars.

As a cinematographer, he has worked in over 30 feature films, numerous documentaries and shorts, having co-operated with over 40 directors. He has also worked on many Hungarian and European TV commercials and music videos. His films have won over 50 awards in Hungarian and international festivals.

Szabó is the co-founder and a leading member of Hungarian Society of Cinematographers.
