= István Örkény =

Hungarian writer

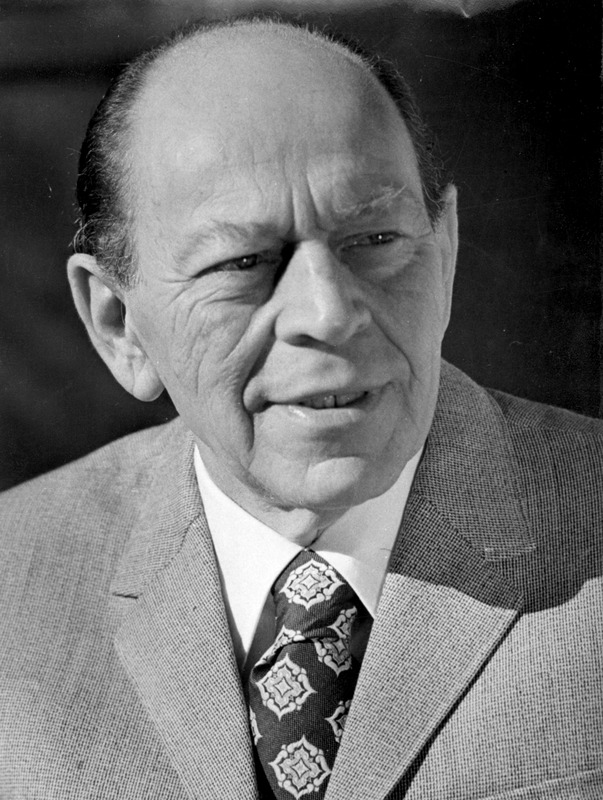
István Örkény 1974

István György Örkény (5 April 1912, Budapest – 24 June 1979, Budapest) was a Hungarian writer whose plays and novels often featured grotesque situations. He was a recipient of the Kossuth Prize in 1973.

== Biography ==
The Örkénys were one of the wealthiest families in Budapest and Hungary as a whole. His father Hugo was the owner and CEO of one of the first pharmaceutical companies in Hungary to have presence outside Europe. He graduated from the Piarist Gymnasium in 1930 and enrolled at the Budapest University of Technology and Economics where he studied chemistry. Two years later, he chose to specialize in pharmacology and received his degree in that subject in 1934.

In 1937, he became associated with the journal Szép Szó and began traveling; to London and Paris, where he held several odd jobs. He returned to Budapest in 1940 and completed his degree in chemical engineering. He published his first book, Ocean Dance, in 1941. In 1942, he was sent to the Russian Front on the Don River. Due to his Judaism, he was placed in a forced-labor unit. There he was captured and detained in a labour camp near Moscow, where he wrote the play Voronesh. In 1946, he returned home to Budapest.

After 1949, he worked as a dramaturge at the Youth Theater and, after 1951, as a playwright at the People's Army Theater. In 1954, he began working as an editor for Szépirodalmi Publishing. He was prohibited from publishing after the Revolution and worked as a chemical engineer at United Pharmaceuticals until 1963. His most famous work, The Toth Family, is about a man who is driven to the verge of insanity and murders the guest his family was having.

He was married three times. His second wife, Angéla Nagy was a cookbook writer. They were married from 1948 to 1959. His third wife, Zsuzsa Radnóti was a prize-winning dramaturge. They were married in 1965.

He died of heart failure in 1979 and was buried in Farkasréti Cemetery. In 2004, the Madách Chamber Theatre in Budapest was renamed the Örkény Theater in his honour.

== Works ==
- Tengertánc (1941)
- Lágerek népe (1947)
- Voronyezs (1948)
- Macskajáték (Cat's Play, 1966)
- Tóték (The Toth Family, 1966)
- Egyperces novellák (One Minute Stories, 1968)
- "Rózsakiállítás" (The Flower Show, 1977)
