= Colonel Redl =

- Theatrical release poster
- Directed by: István Szabó
- Written by: István Szabó; Péter Dobai
- Based on: A Patriot for Me by John Osborne
- Produced by: Manfred Durniok
- Starring: Klaus Maria Brandauer; Gudrun Landgrebe; Hans-Christian Blech; Jan Niklas; Armin Mueller-Stahl
- Cinematography: Lajos Koltai
- Edited by: Zsuzsa Csákány
- Music by: Zdenko Tamássy
- Production companies: Jadran Film; MAFILM; Objektív Filmstúdió
- Distributed by: Orion Pictures (USA)
- Release dates: 20 February 1985 (Hungary); 29 March 1985 (West Germany)
- Running time: 144 minutes
- Countries: Hungary; West Germany; Austria
- Languages: German; Hungarian

Colonel Redl (German: Oberst Redl (original title); Hungarian: Redl ezredes) is a 1985 biographical drama film by Hungarian director István Szabó. The plot, set in the period before World War I, follows the rise of Alfred Redl, an officer in the Austro-Hungarian Empire. Redl, who comes from a humble background, enters military school as a boy and an illustrious military career comes his way by virtue of his loyalty to the crown. He is appointed the head of an intelligence-gathering unit, but his attraction to men eventually causes his downfall.

The screenplay, loosely inspired by British playwright John Osborne's play A Patriot for Me, charts the rise of inter-ethnic tensions in Austro-Hungary, which were to bring about the assassination in Sarajevo and the empire's eventual disintegration.

The film stars Klaus Maria Brandauer, Jan Niklas and Gudrun Landgrebe. It was nominated for an Academy Award for Best Foreign Film and won the Jury Prize at Cannes Film Festival in 1985.

== Plot ==
Alfred Redl, a Ruthenian boy from Galicia in the Austro-Hungarian Empire, wins an appointment to a prestigious military academy in spite of being the son of a mere peasant farmer. At his departure from home, his mother instils in him eternal gratitude towards Emperor Franz Josef. Redl is never to forget that he owes his promising career to the Emperor.

At the military academy, the young Redl is punished along with a fellow cadet, Kristof Kubinyi, when the latter's wooden lance breaks as they are practicing fighting; as they are beaten while running the gauntlet, they put their arms around each other's bare shoulders. Redl soon stands out for his talent, drive and loyalty to the Crown. When one of his teachers demands that he say who played a practical joke, he at first refuses, but when the teacher says that if he stays silent Kubinyi will be expelled, he names a different student; whilst he blames himself for incriminating his comrade, Alfred soon realises that to rise in the ranks he must overcome his peasant background by ingratiating himself with his superiors. Alfred and Kristof become firm friends, and Kristof invites Redl home for the holidays to the elegant residence of his parents, who lead a life of privilege and nobility in Hungary. There, Alfred meets Kristof's pretty sister, Katalin, who welcomes him warmly. To Kubinyi's aristocratic parents, Redl hides his true humble background, pretending to be of Hungarian ancestry and a member from an old family who lost all its fortune.

Redl and Kubinyi slowly climb the ladder as career officers. Once they become adults, the two friends have different political ideals. As a Hungarian, Kubinyi slowly falls prey to the national aspirations of a Hungary free from Habsburg rule, while Redl remains fiercely patriotic and faithful to his benefactor, the Austrian Emperor. For Redl, his relationship with Kubinyi goes beyond friendship as Redl harbors an unrequited love for his comrade. When the two young men visit a brothel, Redl seems more interested in watching his friend having sex than in engaging a woman in his own room. Redl suppresses his attraction to Kristof, however, and transfers it, as best he can, to Katalin, his friend's beautiful married sister. Back at the academy, Alfred serves as a second in a duel between Kristof and another classmate, who is killed in the contest. This foolishness jeopardizes the careers of both Kubinyi and Redl, but the commanding officer, Colonel von Roden, having noted Redl's hard work and loyalty to the Emperor, arranges a promotion for him and a prized assignment in Vienna. In Vienna, Redl is able to renew his friendship with Katalin, who is, by then, unhappily married. They become lovers in spite of Katalin knowing well that it is her brother who Alfred really loves.

Redl is assigned to a garrison serving on the Russian border. The discipline there is lax and Redl readily stands out as a serious-minded young officer. When the district commander decides to retire, Redl is recommended for the position. As commanding officer, he proves very demanding, working hard to reinvigorate the discipline of his outfit. This does not sit well with the junior officers, including Kristof, especially because they feel superior to Redl by birth. When Redl and Kristof have a falling out over Kristof's sloppy habits and poor performance, Kristof mocks Redl's lowly origins in conversation with other officers.

Colonel von Roden intervenes on Redl's behalf again, bringing him back to Vienna to serve as deputy chief of the counter-espionage branch of the Evidenzbureau. It's a nasty job, since it entails spying on officers throughout the Austro-Hungarian Army, trying to identify those engaging in espionage activities. On Katalin's suggestion, Redl undertakes a loveless marriage of convenience in order to quell rumors of his homosexual proclivities. His wife, Clarissa, suffers from ill health and remains a distant figure in his life.

Redl's single-minded devotion to duty draws him into the orbit of the heir to the throne Archduke Franz Ferdinand Emperor's nephew, who is a ruthless schemer whose ultimate objective is portrayed as to overthrow the Emperor in a coup d'état. (This character is often assumed to be the Archduke Franz Ferdinand, but he is not named, and he is not biographically identical with any of the real archdukes; his politics "most closely resemble those of the deceased Rudolf.) Redl participates in one of the heir presumptive's plots, which involves setting up an aging Ukrainian officer for a dramatic fall so as to shake the army out of its complacency. The man is accidentally shot to death, however, during the search and seizure, negating the value of the plan. The heir to the throne then decides to make Redl the fall guy instead. Redl contributes to his own downfall by allowing himself to be seduced by an Italian officer and giving him military secrets to be passed to the Russians. The doomed Redl is arrested. It falls upon Kristof to provide him with a service pistol and order him to commit suicide. After experiencing anger, hesitation and despair, Redl finally shoots himself. The film ends with a brief depiction of the assassination of the Archduke at Sarajevo and the beginning of World War I.

== Cast ==
- Klaus Maria Brandauer as Colonel Alfred Redl
- Hans Christian Blech as Major General Von Roden
- Armin Mueller-Stahl as Thronfolger - Heir to the Throne
- Gudrun Landgrebe as Katalin
- Jan Niklas as Colonel Kristóf Kubinyi
- László Mensáros as Colonel Ruzitska
- András Bálint as Captain Dr. Gustav Sonnenschein
- László Gálffi as Alfredo Velocchio
- Dorottya Udvaros as Clarissa
- Károly Eperjes as Lieutenant Jaromil Schorm
- Róbert Rátonyi as Baron Ullmann
- Flóra Kádár as Redl's sister

== Accuracy ==
The film takes various liberties with history. Redl is said to be a Ruthenian, while in fact his family was of German-Czech origin. Redl is shown as coming from a poor family. In fact, he came from a middle-class background, as his father was a senior employee of the railways. Redl's sister is shown as a poor illiterate peasant woman; in actuality, she was a school-teacher.

The heir to the throne's supposed plot against Redl is fictional.

Redl was homosexual; however, he was not forced into suicide directly because of this. In fact, he was a spy in the pay of the Imperial Russian government, who had blackmailed him over his homosexuality. When Redl's treachery was uncovered, he was encouraged to commit suicide.

== Awards ==
The film won the BAFTA Award for Best Foreign Language Film. It was nominated for an Academy Award for Best Foreign Language Film, but lost to The Official Story.

It won the Jury Prize at the 1985 Cannes Film Festival.

== See also ==
- List of submissions to the 58th Academy Awards for Best Foreign Language Film
- List of Hungarian submissions for the Academy Award for Best International Feature Film
