= Barna Kabay =

Hungarian film director, screenwriter and film producer

Barna Kabay (born 15 August 1948, Budapest) is a Hungarian film director, screenwriter and film producer. His film The Revolt of Job (1983), which he co-directed with Imre Gyöngyössy, was nominated for the Academy Award for Best Foreign Language Film.

== Selected filmography ==
- Job's Revolt (1983)
- Yerma (1984)
