= Robert van Ackeren =

German director

- Born: Robert van Ackeren; 22 December 1946 (age 78); Berlin, Allied-occupied Germany
- Occupation(s): Director, writer, producer, actor
- Years active: 1971–present

Robert van Ackeren (born 22 December 1946) is a German movie director, actor, producer, writer and cinematographer.

== Filmography (director) ==
- Blondie's Number One (1971)
- The Sensuous Three (1972)
- The Last Word (1975)
- Belcanto oder Darf eine Nutte schluchzen? (1977)
- The Other Smile (1978, TV film)
- Deutschland privat – Eine Anthologie des Volksfilms (1980)
- Purity of Heart (1980)
- A Woman in Flames (1983)
- The Venus Trap (1988)
- The True Story About Men and Women (1992)
- Deutschland privat – Im Land der bunten Träume (2007)
