= Imre Gyöngyössy =

Hungarian film director and screenwriter

Imre Gyöngyössy (25 February 1930 – 1 May 1994) was a Hungarian film director and screenwriter. His film The Revolt of Job (1983), which he co-directed with Barna Kabay, was nominated for the Academy Award for Best Foreign Language Film. Gyöngyössy said that he intended the film "as a message not only between generations but between nations".

== Selected filmography ==
- Job's Revolt (1983)
- Yerma (1984)
