= Viktor Tóth =

- Born: Viktor Tóth; 19 May 1977; Kiskunhalas, Hungary
- Genres: jazz
- Occupations: Musician, bandleader, composer
- Instruments: alto saxophone, saxophone
- Website: www.tothviktor.hu/en

Viktor Tóth (born 19 May 1977) is an alto saxophonist, composer and orchestra leader, has been awarded Jazz Musician of the Year several times. One of the top figures of the young generation of the contemporary Hungarian jazz scene, his performance style bridges styles, is improvisation-centred, "soaring" and filled with spirituality.

== Career ==
Viktor Tóth began his musical studies at the age of 14. A defining musical experience was meeting Ákos Molnár, saxophonist, at the point when he chose music over the path of an architect. Around this time, American big band jazz had a strong influence on him. Later he moved towards combo formations and the style and music of Charlie Parker and John Coltrane had an important impact on him.

At the end of the 90s he was a member of several Hungarian formations. In 1998 he was accepted into the Jazz department of the Liszt Ferenc Academy of Music from where he graduated with outstanding results in 2003. During this period he formed his first trio with Zoltán Oláh and András Mohay, then his first quartet formation with Gábor Cseke, Mátyás Szandai and the afore-mentioned András Mohay.

In the period that followed he performed in concerts with Imre Kőszegi, Gyula Babos, Attila László, Béla Szakcsi Lakatos, Mihály Dresch, Tamás Berki, Kálmán Oláh, Ferenc Kovács, and with artists from the international jazz scene William Parker, Henry Franklin, Leena Conquest, Peter Finch, Arnie Somogyi, Winston Clifford, Tim Giles, Gareth Williams, Piotr Wojtasik, John Betsch and Eric Allen.

His first album, Tercett, was released in 2005. This was followed by Climbing With Mountains (2007) – with Hamid Drake and Mátyás Szandai – through BMC label and in the same year he was awarded the Jazz Musician of the Year in Hungary. Then he released Tartim (2009) with a similar line-up, followed by Popping Bopping (2011). In 2013 he founded his unusual formation trio Tóth Viktor Arura Trió, with Miklós Lukács (cimbalom) and György Orbán (double bass). This unique trio released its first ballad album, Szemed Kincse in 2014 and in 2015 was awarded Jazz Album of the Year by the jury of critics.

He regularly plays as a member of various formations in Europe and the United States. He often performs in a trio with Hamid Drake, a top jazz drummer who incorporates Afro-Cuban, Indian, and African percussion instruments and influence, and with double bassist Mátyás Szandai. Throughout Europe he plays as a sideman for Piotr Wojtasik, a Polish trumpeter. in his innovative contemporary quartet with John Betsch and Michal Baranski. He has performed at numerous festivals including in Italy, Germany and Great Britain with his new formation Tóth Viktor & Masim Badavi Players in which permanent partners are the Belgian trumpeter Bart Maris. In his formation Tóth Viktor Tercett, György Orbán plays the double bass and the outstanding young musician Dávid Hodek plays the drums. He has participated in unusual projects too: he has composed music for theatre, and plays duets for contemporary dance. At the beginning of the 2000s, his musical interest turned towards Bulgarian and other Balkan styles as well as oriental music. He also collects and processes folk music in eastern countries. These eastern folk influences are most strongly apparent in his saxophone quartet, Road Six Sax, established in the 1990s. Eastern musics and ornaments have a great influence on his jazz performance, too. His jazz hip hop project, Bird Food Market –Dávid Szarvas beatbox, – Gergő Kolta bass guitar, – Viktor Tóth alto saxophone, keyboard, loops –, that with its fusion of bebop music and broken rhythms received great acclaim in the avant-garde hiphop clubs in Budapest.

== Important performances ==
- Bansko Jazz Festival, Sofia Jazz Festival (Bulgaria)
- Krakow Jazz Festival (Poland)
- Warsaw Summer Jazz Days (Poland)
- Wroclaw Jazz Festival (Poland)
- Kaunas Jazz Festival (Lithuania)
- London, Hungarian Cultural Centre, Club 606 (Great Britain)
- Berlin Jazz Festival (Germany)
- Burgahausen Jazz Festival (Germany)
- Düsseldorf Jazz Festival (Germany)
- Moszkva, Hungarian Institute of Culture (Russia)
- Saransk Jazz Festival (Russia)
- Flip Fest New York (USA)
- New Orleans Jazz Festival (USA)
- Rochester Jazz Festival (USA)
- Washington, Hungarian Cultural Centre (USA)

== Discography ==
=== As Leader ===
- Tercett (Gramy Records, 2005)
- Climbing with Mountains (2007)
- Tartim (2009)
- popping bopping (2011)
- Szemed kincse / The Present (2014)

=== As Sideman ===
- Berki Tamás: A híd (2004)
- Tibor Márkus/Equinox: Eclectic (2004)
- Hungarian Jazz Store (2005)
- Berki Tamás: Bika (2009)
- The Cool Runnings Orchestra: Tribute to Marley (2011)
- Piotr Wojtasik Quartet – Amazing Twelve (2014)

== Awards ==
- Lakatos Ablakos Dezső scholarship (2006)
- Jazz Album of the Year (2007 - Climbing with Mountains)
- Jazzman of the Year (2010)
- Jazz Album of the Year (2014, 2015 - Szemed kincse / The Present)
- Alto Saxophonist of the Year Award (2014)
- Jazz Composer of the Year (2014)

== Criticism ==
- https://web.archive.org/web/20160304073525/http://www.discos-argentinos.com.ar/VerCritica.aspx?idcritica=72
- http://www.kurt-rade.de/kurt/Cds-I.htm
- http://www.jazzzeitung.de/cms/2015/03/die-melancholie-des-altsaxofons/
- http://www.jazzmagazine.com/index.php/le-jazz-live/1242-showcases-hongrois-a-l-assemblee-de-l-ejn-budapest-24-26-septembre
- http://www.jazzwisemagazine.com/breaking-news/13824-budapest-bop-european-jazz-network-hits-hungary-for-2015-jazz-conference-and-showcase-concerts
- http://www.allaboutjazz.com/european-jazz-conference-2015-hungarian-showcases-mihaly-dresch-by-henning-bolte.php?&pg=5
- http://longplayrecenzje.blox.pl/2014/08/Viktor-TOTH-Arura-Trio-The-Present-2014.html
