= Flóra Kádár =

Hungarian actress (1928–2003)

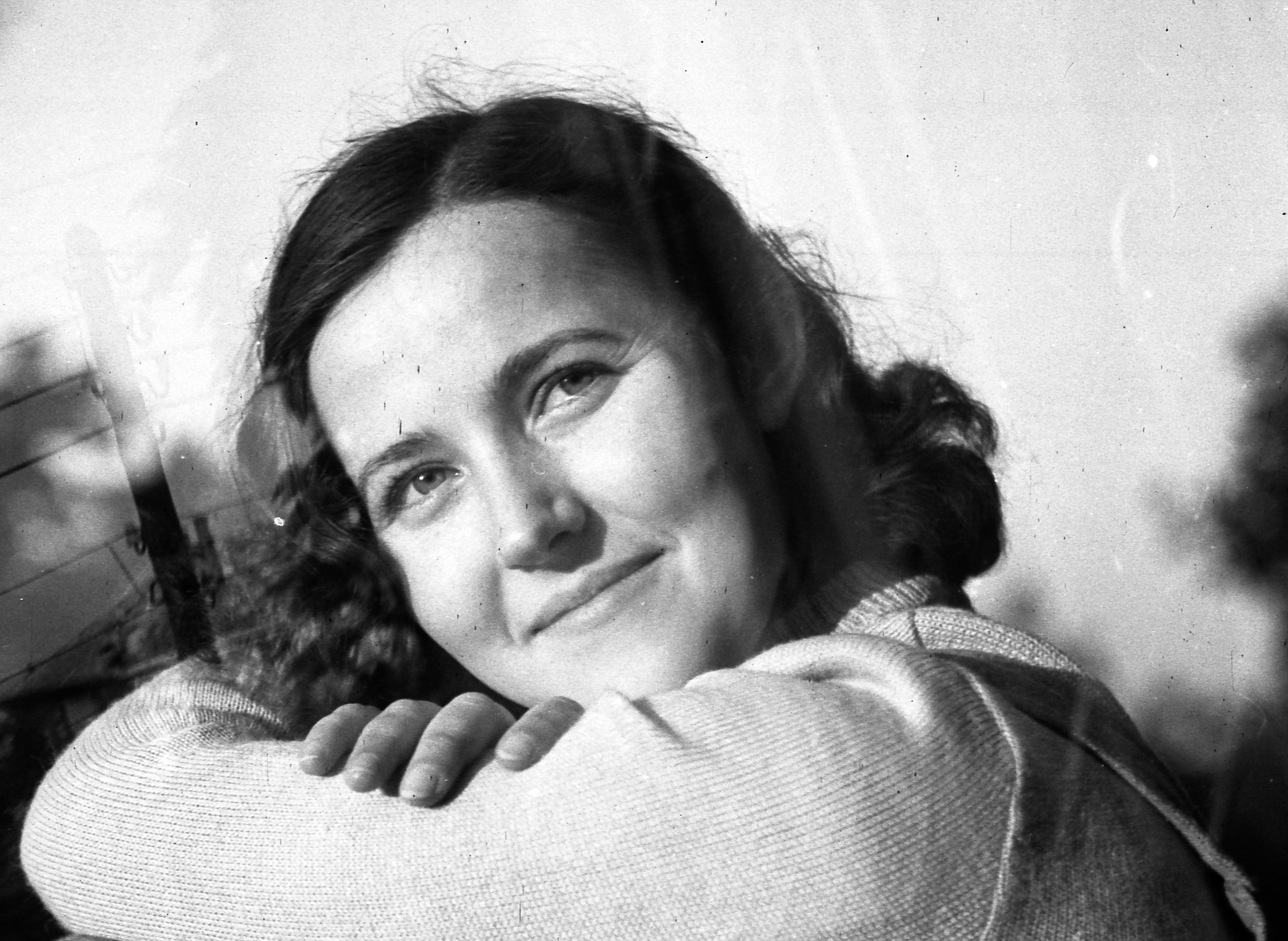
- Kádár during the 1950s
- Born: 4 August 1928; Budapest, Hungary
- Died: 3 January 2003 (aged 74); Budapest, Hungary
- Other names: Fischer Péterné (married name); Flóra Fischer
- Occupation: Actress
- Years active: 1953–2002
- Partner(s): Péter Fischer, DOP and photojournalist (1929–2013)

Flóra Kádár (Hungarian: [ˈfloːrɒ ˈkaːdaːr]; 4 August 1928 – 3 January 2003) was a Hungarian actress. She was known for her roles of Mrs. Hackl in the film Sunshine, Redl's sister in the film Colonel Redl, and Erzsi, Jóska's wife in the film Adoption.

== Life ==
Her father was teacher Lajos Horcsák and her mother was Flóra Ohr who got married on 28 December 1926 in Székesfehérvár. Flóra Kádár's husband was DOP and photojournalist Péter Fischer, the elder brother of pianist and conductor György Fischer.

György Fischer's first wife was opera singer Lucia Popp. After being divorced from Popp he married American violinist Ida Bieler.

She earned a degree from the Academy of Drama and Film in Budapest in 1953. She played at the National Theatre of Szeged, Kisfaludy Theatre in Győr and Madách Theatre in Budapest.

== Selected filmography ==
- Vihar (1952)
- Young Hearts (1953) – Rózsi
- 2x2 néha 5 (1955)
- Merry-Go-Round (1956)
- Az özvegy és a százados (1967)
- A völgy (1968)
- Az utolsó kör (1968) – Kalauz
- Az örökös (1969) – Drapp barátnõje
- Virágvasárnap (1969)
- Csak egy telefon (1970) – Éva szomszédasszonya
- Lovefilm (1970)
- Hekus lettem (1972) – Utas
- A törökfejes kopja (1974)
- Adoption (1975) – Erzsi, Jóska felesége
- Várakozók (1975) – Egy parasztasszony
- Mrs. Dery Where Are You? (1975) – Dajka
- Nobody's Daughter (1976) – A feleség
- Tükörképek (1976)
- Amerikai cigaretta (1978) – Vendég a kocsmában
- Philemon és Baucis (1978)
- A trombitás (1979)
- Angi Vera (1979) – Mrs. János Mikus
- Vasárnapi szülök (1980) – Nevelõnõ
- Koportos (1980)
- Fábián Bálint találkozása Istennel (1980)
- Kojak Budapesten (1980) – Portás (uncredited)
- Boldog születésnapot, Marilyn! (1981) – Müvezetõnõ
- Cserepek (1981)
- Ideiglenes paradicsom (1981)
- Havasi selyemfiú (1981)
- Requiem (1982) – pedicurist
- Talpra, Gyözö! (1983) – óvónéni
- Vérszerzödés (1983)
- Visszaesök (1983) – Ülnök
- Szegény Dzsoni és Árnika (1983)
- The Revolt of Job (1983)
- Hanyatt-homlok (1984)
- Felhöjáték (1984)
- Colonel Redl (1985) – Sophie, Redl's sister
- Akli Miklós (1986)
- Szeleburdi vakáció (1987)
- Malom a pokolban (1987)
- Doktor Minorka Vidor nagy napja (1987) – Rakodó kofa
- Valahol Magyarországon (1987)
- Hótreál (1988)
- A másik ember (1988)
- Kiáltás és kiáltás (1988) – Bözsi néni
- Soha, sehol, senkinek! (1988)
- Sztálin menyasszonya (1991)
- Halálutak és angyalok (1991)
- Szomszédok (1991–1995, TV Series) Grandmother / Old Woman
- Vörös vurstli (1992)
- Roncsfilm (1992)
- Erózió (1992)
- Maigret (1992–1993, TV Series) – Nursemaid / Flower Seller
- We Never Die (1993)
- Hoppá (1993)
- Halál sekély vízben (1994)
- Mesmer (1995) – The Afflicted
- All Men Are Mortal (1995) – Old Woman
- Sunshine (1999) – Mrs. Hackl
- Közel a szerelemhez (1999)

== Selected Hungarian dubbings ==
Film	Character	Actor	Year of dubbing
Sissi (1955)	Mrs. Stöckl		1990–1991
The Wrong Man (1956)			1982
Claire (TV film)	Lotte Rank	Elfriede Irrall	1967
What Ever Happened to Aunt Alice?	Miss Edna Tinsley	Mildred Dunnock	1969
Les Misérables (1978)	The Prioress	Flora Robson	1985
Die Alpensaga: Der deutsche Frühling (TV film)		Burgl Mattuschka	1979
Twenty Six Days from the Life of Dostoyevsky	Fedosia	Tatiana Babanina	1981
Scrooged	Gramma	Mabel King	1988
Hospital at the End of the City (TV series)	Scrub nurse		1982
The Wonderful Adventures of Nils (anime)		–	
Sanitka (Ambulance) (TV series)	Marie Čermáková	Marie Vášová	1984
Das Erbe der Guldenburgs: Die große Enttäuschung (TV series)	Mrs. Böhm		1990
Pretty Woman	Matron	Amzie Strickland	1990
