= Peter Fisher (photojournalist) =

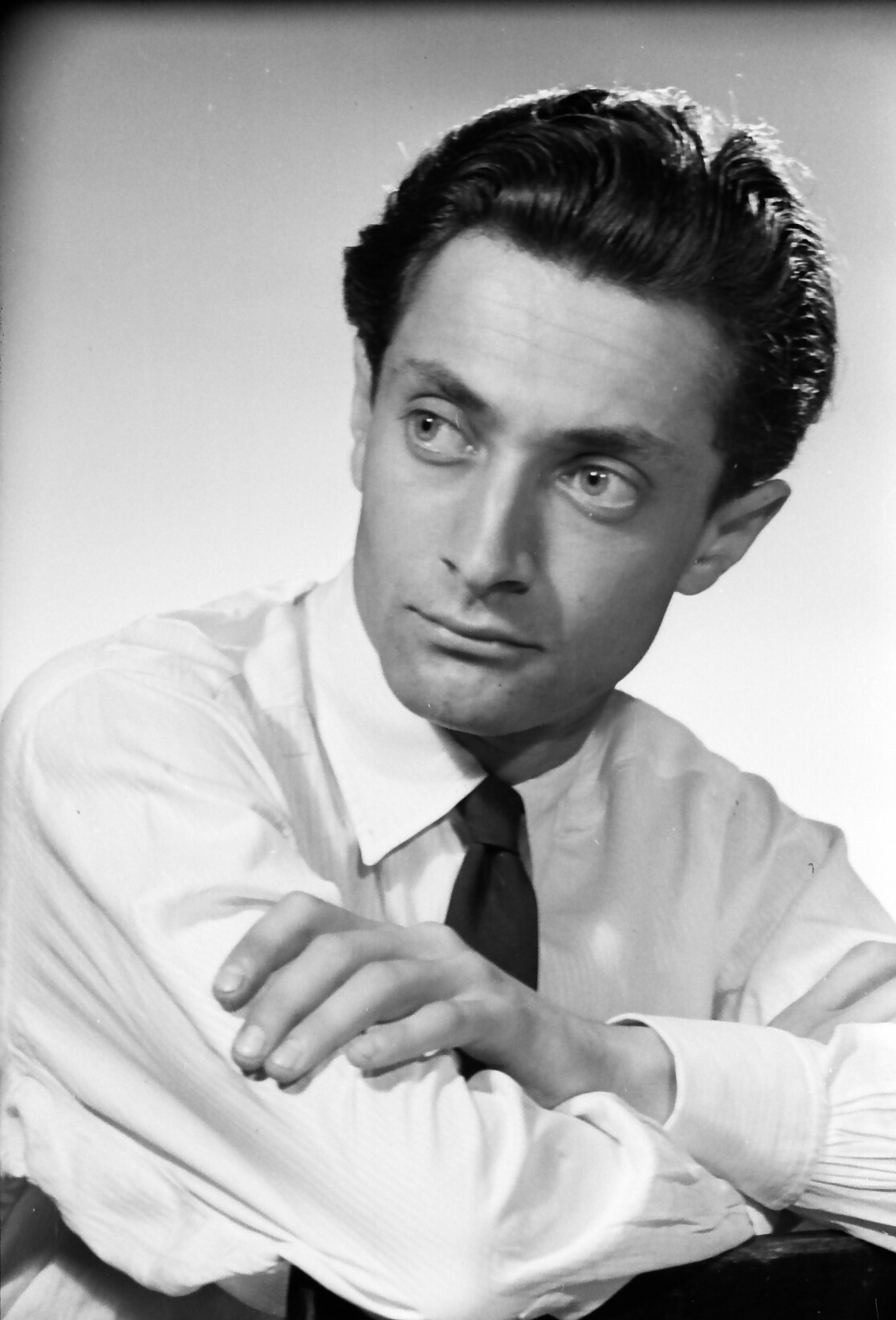
- Born: July 1929; Budapest, Hungary
- Died: 18 March 2013 (aged 83); London, England
- Other name: Péter Fischer (birth name)
- Occupations: cinematographer, photojournalist
- Years active: 1953–2013
- Partner(s): 1. Flóra Kádár, actress (1928–2003); 2. Blandine Costi; 3. Carol Joernet
- Parent(s): Pál Fischer, engineer (1892–1945); Lola Bader (1905–1973)

Peter Fisher (born Péter Fischer; July 1929 – 18 March 2013) was a Hungarian-born cinematographer and photojournalist. He died on 18 March 2013 at the age of 83. The Jewish Chronicle described him as "one of the best-known photographers of the Jewish community". He was best known for photographs of the actress Jayne Mansfield, "whose visit to Peter's studio stopped traffic in the local streets as fans craned to see her."

== Life ==
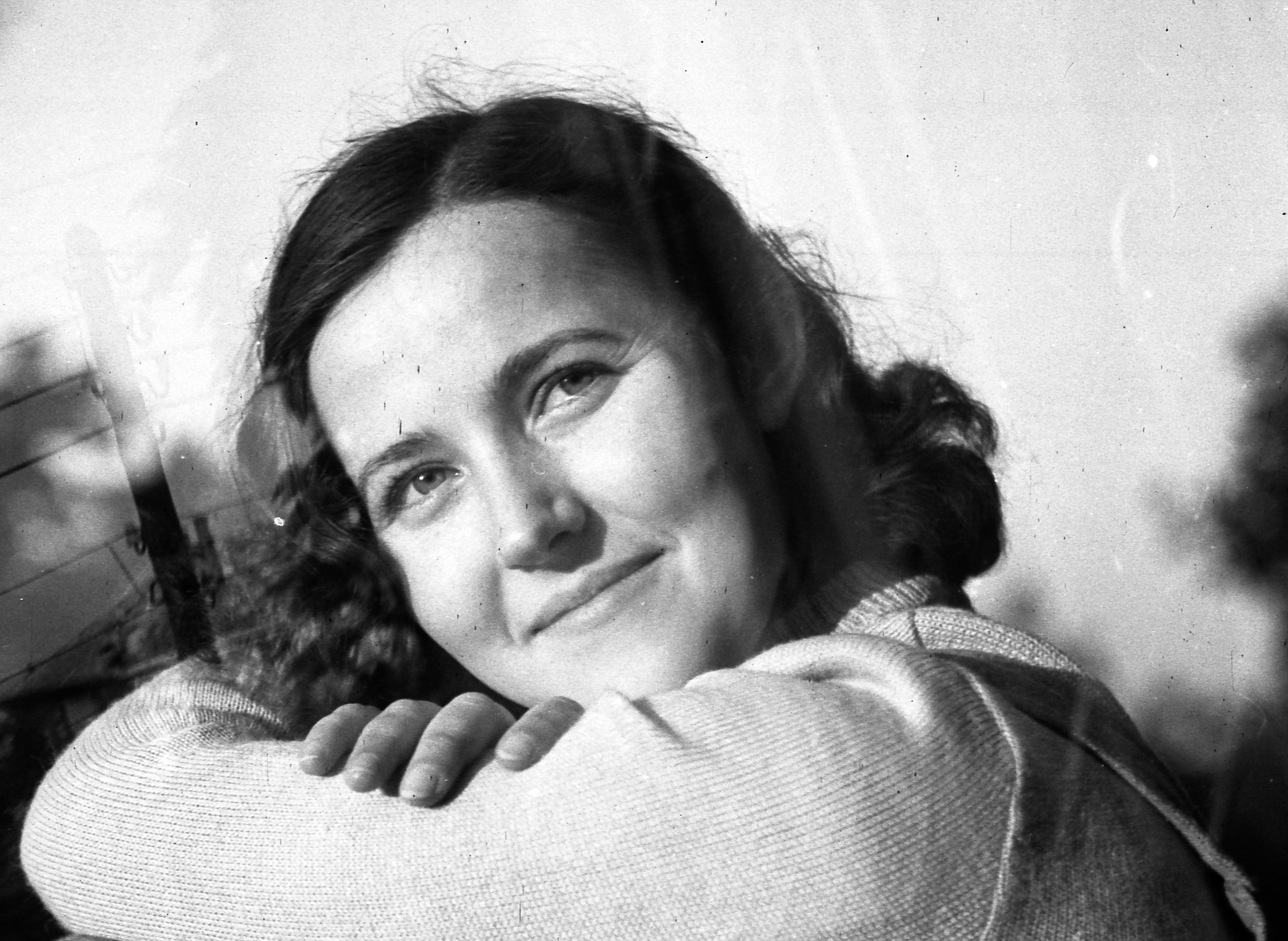
Peter Fisher's first wife, actress Flóra Kádár

He was "born in Budapest into a traditional, rather than observant, Jewish family." His father was engineer Pál Fischer (1892–1945), his mother was Lola Bader (1905–1973).

His first wife was the Hungarian actress Flóra Kádár (1928–2003) but they were divorced. Secondly he married Blandine Costi and thirdly Carol Joernet. His younger brother is the pianist and conductor György Fischer. György Fischer's first wife was opera singer Lucia Popp. After being divorced from Popp he married American violinist Ida Bieler.

His cousins are conductors Ádám Fischer and Iván Fischer.

He studied cinematography at the Academy of Drama and Film in Budapest in the 1950s when he got acquainted with his first wife, Flóra Kádár who took degree in 1953 as actress. Because of the fall of the Hungarian Revolution of 1956, he left Hungary for Great Britain but "he was unable to resume his profession without a union card, so moved instead into stills photography."

== Sources ==
- Anonymous (21 March 2013). "Peter Fisher's work lives on". The Jewish Chronicle Online. Archived from the original on 26 November 2013.
