= Rudolf Tomsits =

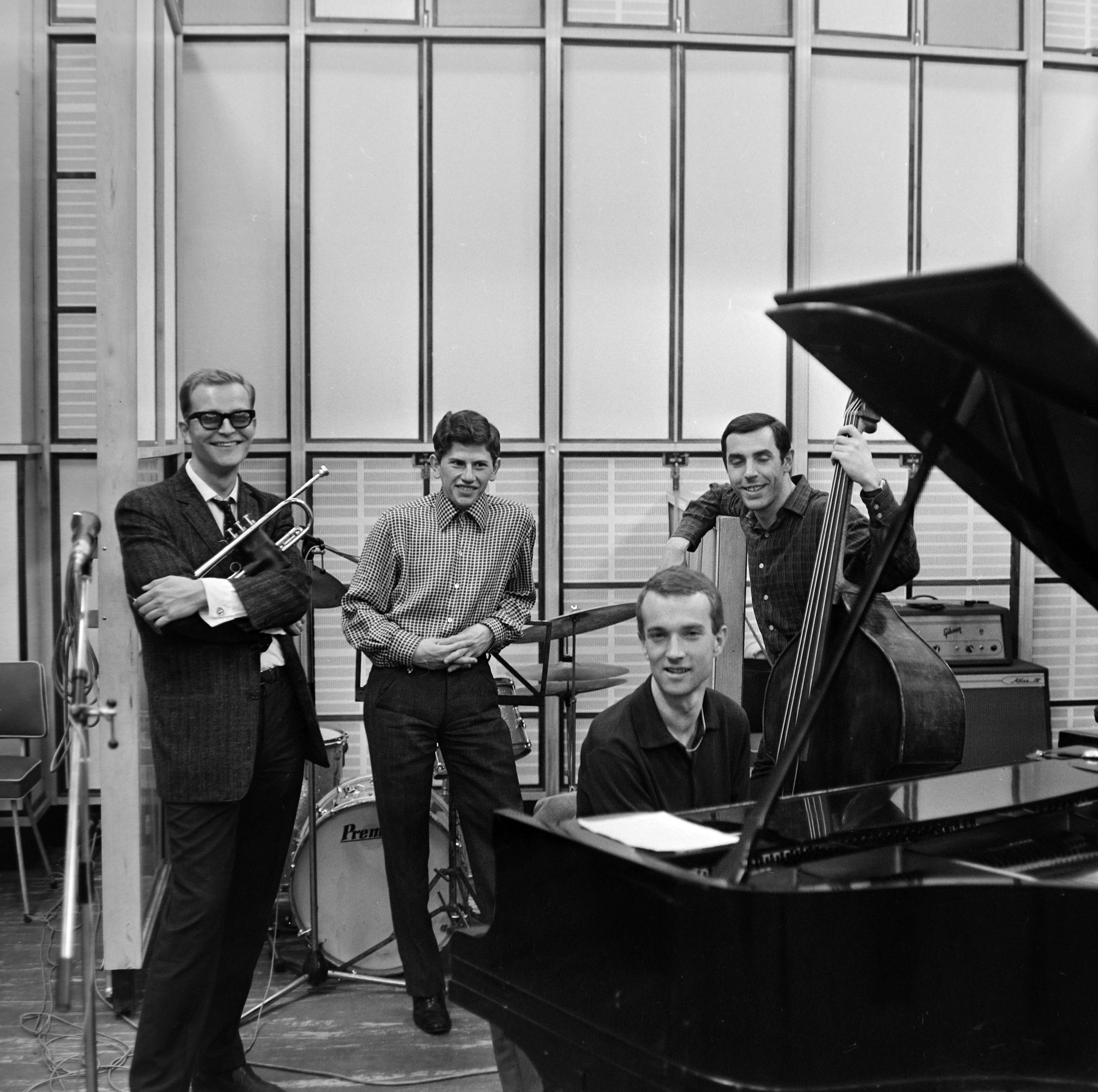
The Rudolf Tomsits Quartet with György Berkes (piano), Balázs Berkes (bass) and Vilmos Jávori (drums)

Rudolf Tomsits (12 May 1946 - 11 June 2003) was a Hungarian jazz musician who played the trumpet and the flugelhorn.

== Biography ==
After a year in Sweden where he worked with Arne Domnerus, Jan Johansson und Egil Johansen, Tomsits became soloist, composer and arranger of the Stúdió 11 band of Magyar Rádió. He played with his own Rudolf Tomsits Quartet, at the Montreux Jazz Festival in 1968 and 1969 as well as festivals in Bled, Vienna, Palermo and Warsaw, among others. In 1971, they toured Europe as the opening act for the Jazz Giants, a band that included Dizzy Gillespie, Thelonious Monk and Art Blakey.

From 1977 to 1980 he conducted a sextet and from 1980 to 1992 he worked for the Yugoslav Radio and Television Association as leader of its Novi Sad big band. In 1995, he formed the Take 4 quartet with Gyula Babos, Aladár Pege and Imre Kőszegi, which published three CDs. He was also active as an educator, teaching trumpet at the Béla Bartók Secondary School of Music from 1994 to 1999, and later as an associate professor at the Franz Liszt Academy of Music for two years.

In 2003 he was awarded the Gábor Szabó Award of the Hungarian Jazz Association.
