= Attila László =

Hungarian jazz guitarist and composer (born 1953)

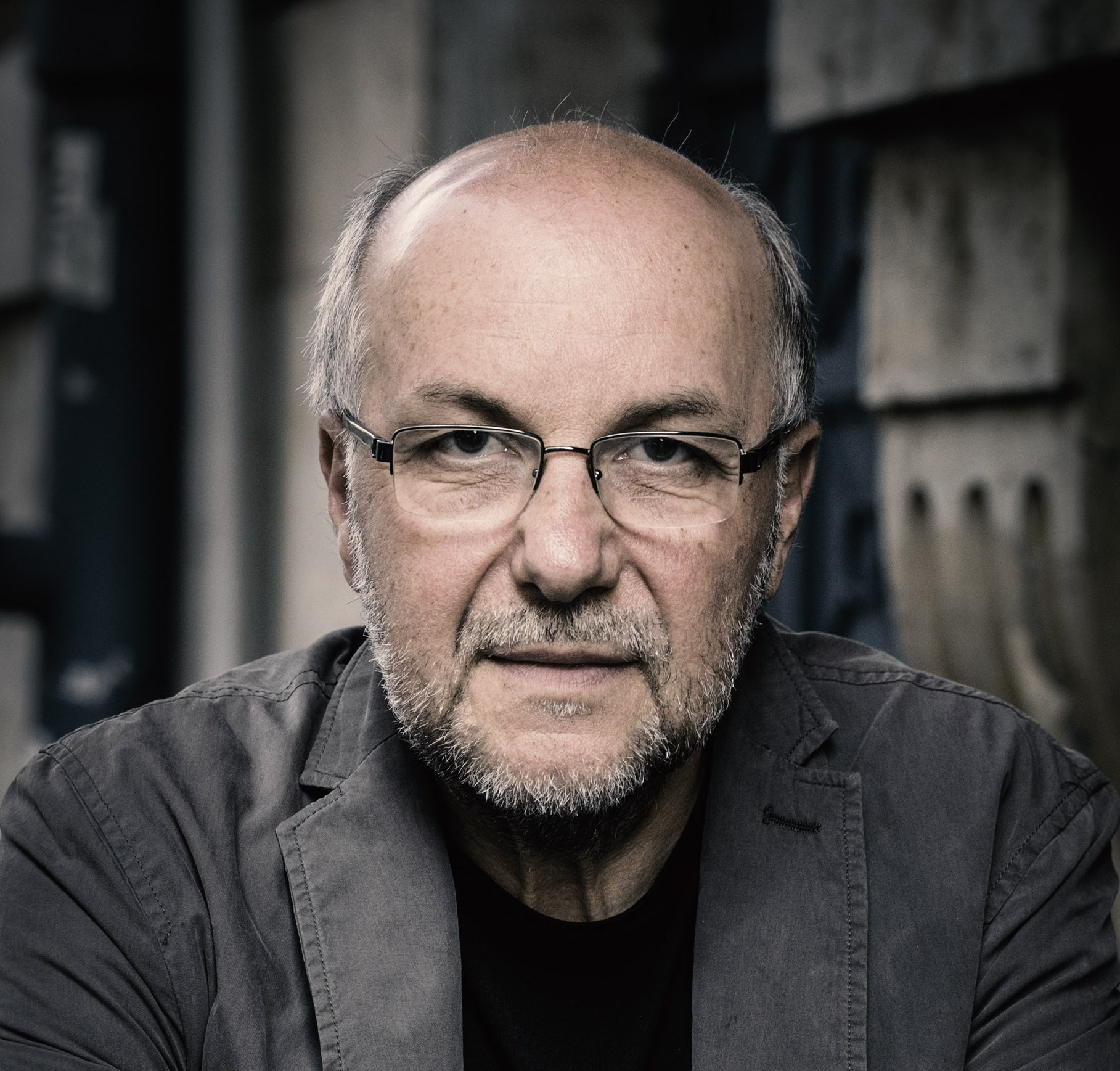

Background information
- Born: László Attila; July 10, 1953 (age 73); Kaposvár, Hungary
- Genres: Jazz
- Occupation: Musician
- Instrument: Guitar
- Years active: 1975–present
- Website: laszloattila.com

Attila László (born 10 July 1953) is a Hungarian jazz guitarist and composer. László is one of the leaders of Hungary's second generation of jazz musicians, which includes Lakatos, Dés, Kőszegi, and Pege. He was president of the Hungarian Jazz Federation (1999–2005) and performed with Anthony Jackson, Randy Brecker, James Moody, David Friedman, Gary Willis, Bob Mintzer, Peter Erskine, Hiram Bullock, Miroslav Vitous, Ilaiyaraaja, Russell Ferrante, and Jimmy Haslip. Laszlo won the Golden Cross of Merit prize.

== Biography ==
After finishing his studies at Béla Bartók Secondary School of Music he performed with prominent jazz bands in Hungary. In 1975 he founded a jazz band by the name of Kaszakő and recorded his first album with them in 1983. He worked as a musician in the studio of Magyar Rádió, Hungary's publicly funded radio broadcasting organization, from 1980 to 1988. In 1985 he joined Tony Lakatos to form his second band, Things. They performed at various events, including performances on Hungarian television. Since 1987 he has been teaching at Franz Liszt Academy of Music. He is the leader of its big band.

It was not until 1992 that László formed his own band, the László Attila Band. Although, in this formation all of the songs were composed by him, pianist, Kálmán Oláh also wrote some compositions to their album Once Upon a Time. At the beginning of 2004 László toured in the United States. The band performed eight concerts in metropolises like New York.

In 1999 László was awarded the Gábor Szabó jazz life achievement prize and he was elected as the president of the Hungarian Jazz Federation. In 2000 he was given the Leo Weiner music pedagogy prize. Three years later he received the Franz Liszt prize for his performing activities. In 2009 Laszló was invited by Ilaiyaraaja, Indian film composer, whom he met during his stay in Budapest, Hungary. Later László visited him in Chennai and Madurai to teach him composing and orchestration. In 2010 László was awarded the Golden Cross of Merit prize of the Hungarian Republic. In December 2011 he played a concert in Jawaharlal Nehru Indoor Stadium as a guest musician of Ilaiyaraaja. In March 2012 he contributed to Ilaiyaraaja's recordings in Angel Studio, London. In September 2012 László returned to Chennai Nehru Indoor Stadium to celebrate the new album with a concert. The album was sold in 1 million copies.

Attila László had been appearing as a member & founder of the band "Guitar Trio" with fellow guitarists Gyula Babos and Tibor Tátrai, performing rock and fusion standards as well as original compositions. In 2013 he recorded the album "Bridges of Soul" with Ferenc Nemeth in Los Angeles. Grammy Award winner Russell Ferrante and Jimmy Haslip also performed on the recordings.

At the end of 2013 he conducted the "Senior Big Band", a big band that was formed by the current and former students of his at the Jazz Department of the Ferenc Liszt Academy of Music during the last 33 years at the Concert Hall of the Academy, which has recently been renovated. In January 2014 the same big band also accompanied Grammy-winning singer Patti Austin, who has previously been singing duos with Michael Jackson, Natalie Cole and George Benson. It was a resounding success in the Béla Bartók National Concert Hall of the Palace of Arts.

"Tell Your Story" - Attila László's "Author's Night" took place at the Budapest Music Center (BMC) with Modern Art Orchestra on 28 February 2016. Attila László's big band compositions were performed by the author on guitar and the big band.

Attila László recorded his album "Magic City" together with Budapest Jazz Orchestra big band and the soloists such as Kálmán Oláh, Charlie, Mónika Veres, Béla Lattmann, Péter Kaszás. The album features 9 of Attila László’s compositions arranged for a big band.

The Budapest String Chamber Ensemble, the woodwind instruments and jazz quartet performed Attila László’s new work in the Óbuda Society in June 2019 for the first time, called "Concerto for Jazz Guitar and Chamber Orchestra". Jazz guitarist Gábor Juhász wrote about it as: "a milestone in the history of Hungarian jazz guitar playing."

The guitar concerto, "Concerto for Jazz Guitar & Chamber Orchestra" was recorded at the end of the year and was released in the spring of 2020 by Tom-Tom Records. The author played the guitar part of the pieces, in addition to the jazz guitar, the jazz trio also played a significant role with the soloist Kálmán Oláh - the flute - oboe - bassoon woodwind section and the string orchestral sound performed by the Budapest Strings.

The "László Attila Fusion Circus" was formed in 2019 and performed for the first time at the Cegléd Drummer and Percussion Gala. The ensemble plays the band’s dynamic jazz-rock compositions, arranged for wind and rhythm instruments. The Hungarian but New York-based Gergő Borlai was the guest of the group and the Drummer Gala.

== Awards and honors ==
- 1997 – composer of the year – Artisjus
- 1999 – Gábor Szabó life achievement prize
- 2000 – Leo Weiner prize
- 2002 – Artisjus performer prize
- 2003 – Franz Liszt prize
- 2010 – Golden Cross of Merit of the Hungarian Republic prize
- 2010 – Hungarian Jazz prize – Gramofon
- 2015 - Janos Gonda prize
- 2017 - Composer of the Year – Artisjus

== Discography ==
- Just Relax (Qualiton, 1990)
- Just Trust (Tom-Tom, 2006)
- Babel (Tom-Tom, 2009)
- Bridges of Souls (Dreamers Collective, 2014)
