= Judit Halász =

Hungarian actress and singer

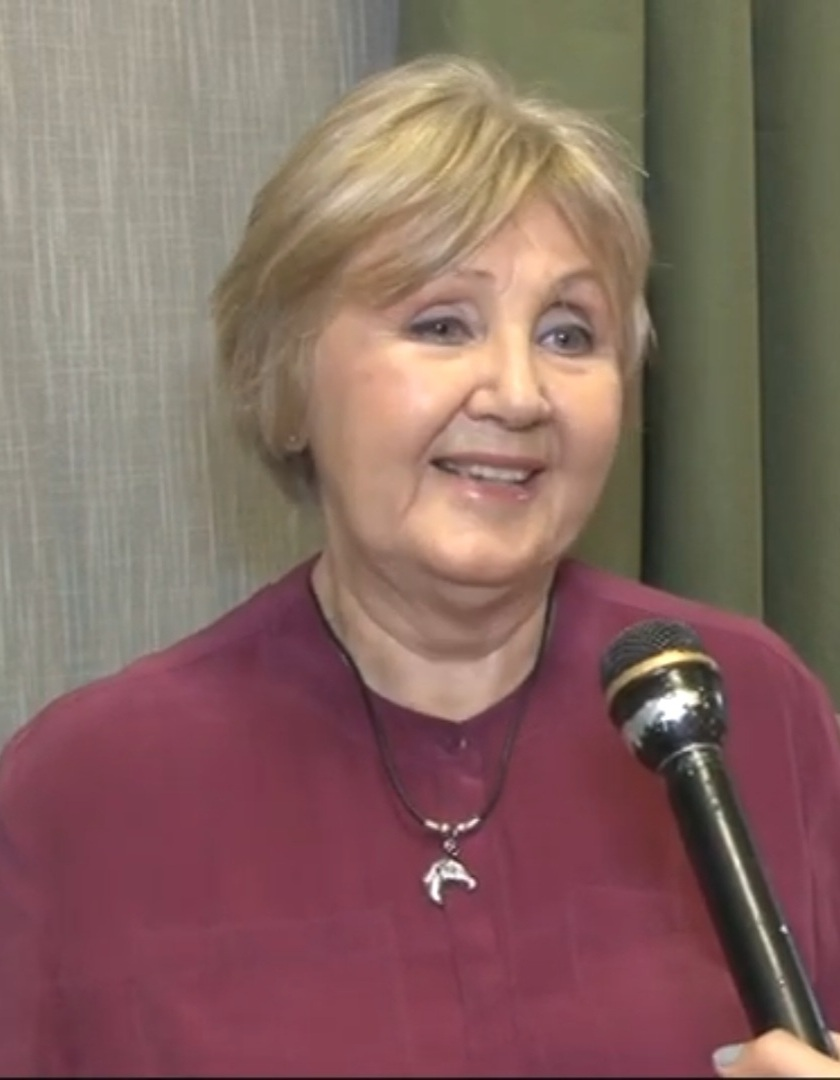
- Halász in 2019
- Born: 7 October 1942 (age 84); Budapest, Hungary
- Occupations: Actress; singer
- Years active: 1962–present

Judit Halász (born 7 October 1942) is a Hungarian actress and singer. She has appeared in more than sixty films since 1962.

She is known for her albums of Hungarian children's music. Her earlier albums were collaborations with the band Fonográf, featuring former Illés members János Bródy and Levente Szörényi, and she has continued to work with individual members of the group throughout her career.

== Selected filmography ==
Year	Title	Role	Notes
1965	Age of Illusions	Habgab	
1966	Father		
1970	Lovefilm	Kata	
1974	The Pendragon Legend	Cynthia Pendragon	
1980	Bizalom		
