= Zsuzsa Koncz =

Hungarian pop singer (born 1946)

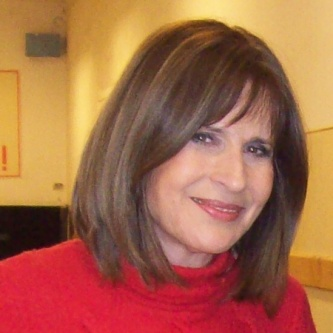
- Zsuzsa Koncz in April 2011

Background information
- Born: 7 March 1946 (age 80); Pély, Hungary
- Genres: Rock, pop-rock, beat
- Occupations: Singer, actress
- Years active: 1962–

Zsuzsa Koncz (born Zsuzsanna Koncz) (Hungarian: Koncz Zsuzsa, born 7 March 1946, Pély) is a Hungarian pop singer, whose lyrics (mostly written by János Bródy) were sometimes highly critical of the country's pre-1990 political system.

Her career started after her performance in the Ki mit tud? talent show of 1962. She has been performing with various bands and musicians over the years, most notably Illés and János Bródy. In the 1970s, she made several successful tours abroad, mainly in Eastern Bloc countries as well as in West Germany (sometimes under the names Shusha Koncz and Jana Koncz in German-speaking countries), but also in France, the US, and Japan. She remains extremely popular in Hungary, with some of her songs now part of Hungarian folklore, among them: 'A Kárpáthyék lánya', 'Ha én rózsa volnék', and 'Valahol egy lány'.

== Awards ==
- Liszt Prize in 1977
- Chevalier de la Légion d'honneur in 2001
- Kossuth Prize in 2008
- Honorary Citizen of Budapest in 2020

== Discography ==
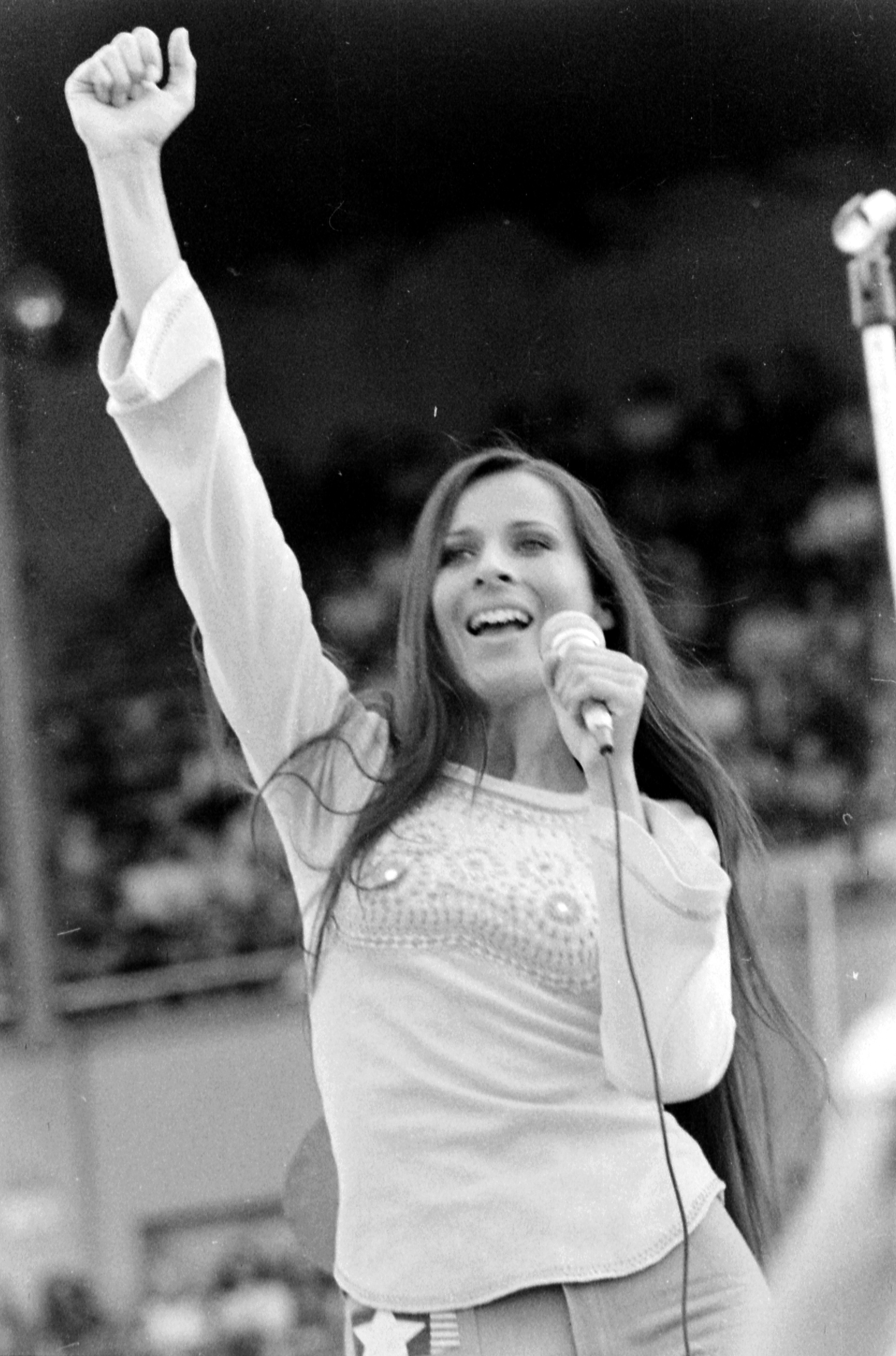
1973

1. Volt egyszer egy lány (1969)
2. Szerelem (1970)
3. Jana Koncz (West Germany, in German, 1970)
4. Kis Virág (1971)
5. Élünk és meghalunk (1972)
6. Zsuzsa Koncz (GDR, in German, 1972)
7. Jelbeszéd (1973)
8. Gyerekjátékok (1974)
9. Kertész leszek (poems, 1975)
10. Ne vágj ki minden fát! (1975)
11. ...Elmondom hát mindenkinek (poems, 1976)
12. Koncz Zsuzsa X. (1977)
13. Aranyalbum (1967–1973) (compilation, 1978)
14. Valahol (1979)
15. Ich komm und geh mit meinen Liedern (GDR, in German, 1980)
16. Menetrend (1981)
17. Die lauten Jahre sind vorbei (GDR, in German, 1982)
18. Konczert (1984)
19. Shusha Koncz Morgenlicht (Austria, in German, 1984)
20. Újhold (1985)
21. Fordul a világ (1988)
22. Koncz Zsuzsa archív (compilation, 1988)
23. Verslemez III. (poems, 1989)
24. Illúzió nélkül (1991)
25. Jubileumi koncert (1992)
26. Ne veszítsd el a fejed (1993)
27. Unplugged I-II. (1995)
28. Válogatott kislemezek (compilation, 1996)
29. Miénk itt a tér (1996)
30. Ég és föld között (1997)
31. Csodálatos világ (duets, 1998)
32. Miért hagytuk, hogy így legyen? (compilation, 1999)
33. Ki nevet a végén (2002)
34. Wie sag ich's Dir (Germany, in German, 2003)
35. Egyszerű ez (poems, 2006)
36. Die großen Erfolge (Germany, in German, 2007)
37. 37 (2010)
38. Tündérország (2013)
39. Aréna 10 (2014)
40. Vadvilág (2016)
41. Aréna koncert 2017. (2017)
42. Így volt szép (2019)
43. Szabadnak születtél (2020)
44. Te szeress legalább (2022)
