= János Bródy =

Hungarian musician (born 1946)

Background information
- Born: 5 April 1946 (age 80); Budapest, Hungary
- Genres: Rock; Pop; Country
- Occupations: Singer; guitarist; composer
- Years active: 1964–present
- Website: http://brody.mediastorm.hu

János Kristóf Bródy (Hungarian: Bródy János, born 5 April 1946) is a Hungarian pop singer-songwriter, guitarist, composer and scriptwriter. Successful both with the bands Illés and Fonográf and in his solo career, writing lyrics for singers like Zsuzsa Koncz or for rock operas like István, a király, he was a major figure of the Hungarian music scene in the 60s–90s.

== Early years ==
János Bródy was born on 5 April 1946 in Budapest as the child of András Bródy, Széchenyi Award-winning economist, and Márta Vajna, a teacher.

After his graduation from the Puskás Tivadar Telecommunication Technical School, in 1964 he joined the beat band Illés after a recommendation from Zsuzsa Koncz. The band, which previously gained its Budapest-wide fame from small club concerts playing Italian and English hits (like ones from The Hurricanes, The Shadows and The Beatles) recorded its first albums Long Tall Sally and Little Richard/Chapel. The band was more and more often accompanied by the young Levente Szörényi, with whom Bródy began their acclaimed musical partnership. After many of the members finished university, the band went through multiple changes, but was becoming more and more famous. In 1969 Bródy graduated as an electrical engineer at the Budapest University of Technology.

== Music career ==
=== Illés and Fonográf ===
By 1967 Illés band was not only playing western music, but they played original compositions and the lyrics were in Hungarian. Bródy wrote coded lyrics that – embedding the possibility of multiple interpretations – criticised the communist regime, turning their increasingly crowded events to implicit protests. Szörényi was also experimenting with fusing folk music into rock. By 1972, Illés was increasingly under the pressure due to both passive state harassment, and the huge fan base, which demanded a more popular style compared to their original artistic goals.

On 10 June 1973 at a massive beat event in Diósgyőr, Bródy turned to fans and said "We also wish to thank for the work of the police forces. Yes, I'm serious, as there was many of you who already came here yesterday from Miskolc, many of you who couldn't sleep anywhere, wanted to spend the night out in Avas. For them, the police provided shelter, even if not as comfortable as the bed at home, and let them out today morning, asking them if they slept well, and wishing them fun for tonight." Bródy was sentenced to a one-month residual ban and 5000Ft fine. In his absence, the band started to fall apart, with members sacrificing more and more time to own projects. On 2 November 1973 the band officially split, with founder Lajos Illés re-founding it with new members. After seven years, in 1981 the band gave a final concert with the original members, and while their disagreements remained, group work manifested in talks, documentaries, and concerts in 1990, 1996, 2001 and – marked by the death of drummer Zoltán Pásztory – a last two in 2005.

The same year, in 1973, the Szörényi brothers and Bródy started a new band, Fonográf, with László Tolcsvay, Mihály Móricz and Oszkár Németh. Fonográf played a fusion of progressive rock and folk including country music. Between 1974 and 1984 the band released eleven full albums. Bródy and Szörényi founding Fonográf. Fonográf was also a virtually a workshop with numerous collaborators, notably Zsuzsa Koncz and Judit Halász, while the members also developed their own projects with the group's backing. Their lyrics still featured anti-regime ideas, often coming under heavy censorship. In 1973, discs of Koncz's album Jelbeszéd, written by Bródy was withdrawn from stores and shredded.

=== Plays ===
The 80s marked successful theatrical compositions for the Bródy-Szörényi duo, like Kőműves Kelemen in 1982, cult rock opera István, a király in 1983, or Fehér Anna in 1988. As member projects took increasingly different paths, Fonográf dissolved after three large concerts in 1984.

Bródy's relationship with Szörényi soured after the first democratic elections in 1990 when they began to support rival political parties, restricting their joint artistic work to the few last concerts of Illés and Fonográf. However they continue to appear together.

=== Solo career ===
Bródy's own performing career began with concerts in the Court Theatre (Várszínház) and the University Stage of ELTE. His first album, Hungarian Blues, released in 1980, contained songs that were dominant throughout his later career: mellow, critical, ironical ballads about general life in the 80s, and after 1990, the disappointment in the newly democratized country. Besides giving a few larger solo concerts (notably in 1994), Bródy favors smaller, intimate club and chamber events. He also continued his work on theatrical plays, like A Kiátkozott (1997) and Volt egyszer egy csapat (2005).

== Works ==
=== Discography ===
- Hungarian Blues (1980)
- Ne szólj szám 1985
- Hang nélkül (1989)
- Az utca másik oldalán (1994)
- Kockázatok és mellékhatások (2001)
- Az Illés szekerén (2011)
- Ráadás (2016)

=== Plays and screenplays ===
- Kőműves Kelemen (1981)
- István, a király (1983)
- Fehér Anna (1988)
- Doktor Herz (1989)
- Will Shakespeare vagy akit akartok (1996)
- A kiátkozott (1997)
- Veled, Uram! (2000)
- Volt egyszer egy csapat (2005)

=== Filmography ===
- Ezek a fiatalok (1967) – self
- A Koncert (1983) – self
- István, a király (1984) – screenplay

== Notable awards ==
- Officer's Cross of the Order of Merit of the Hungarian Republic (1995)
- Liszt Ferenc Prize (1996)
- Kossuth Prize (2000) – along with the members of Illés (band)
- Pro Urbe Budapest Award (2006)
- Fonogram Lifetime Achievement Award (2011)

== Sources ==
- Vámos, Miklós. Ha én Bródy volnék. Budapest: Ab Ovo, 1994. ISBN 9789637853166
- Gréczy, Zsolt. Bródy. Budapest: Vince Kiadó, 2003. ISBN 9789639323865
