= Gyula Babos =

Hungarian jazz guitarist

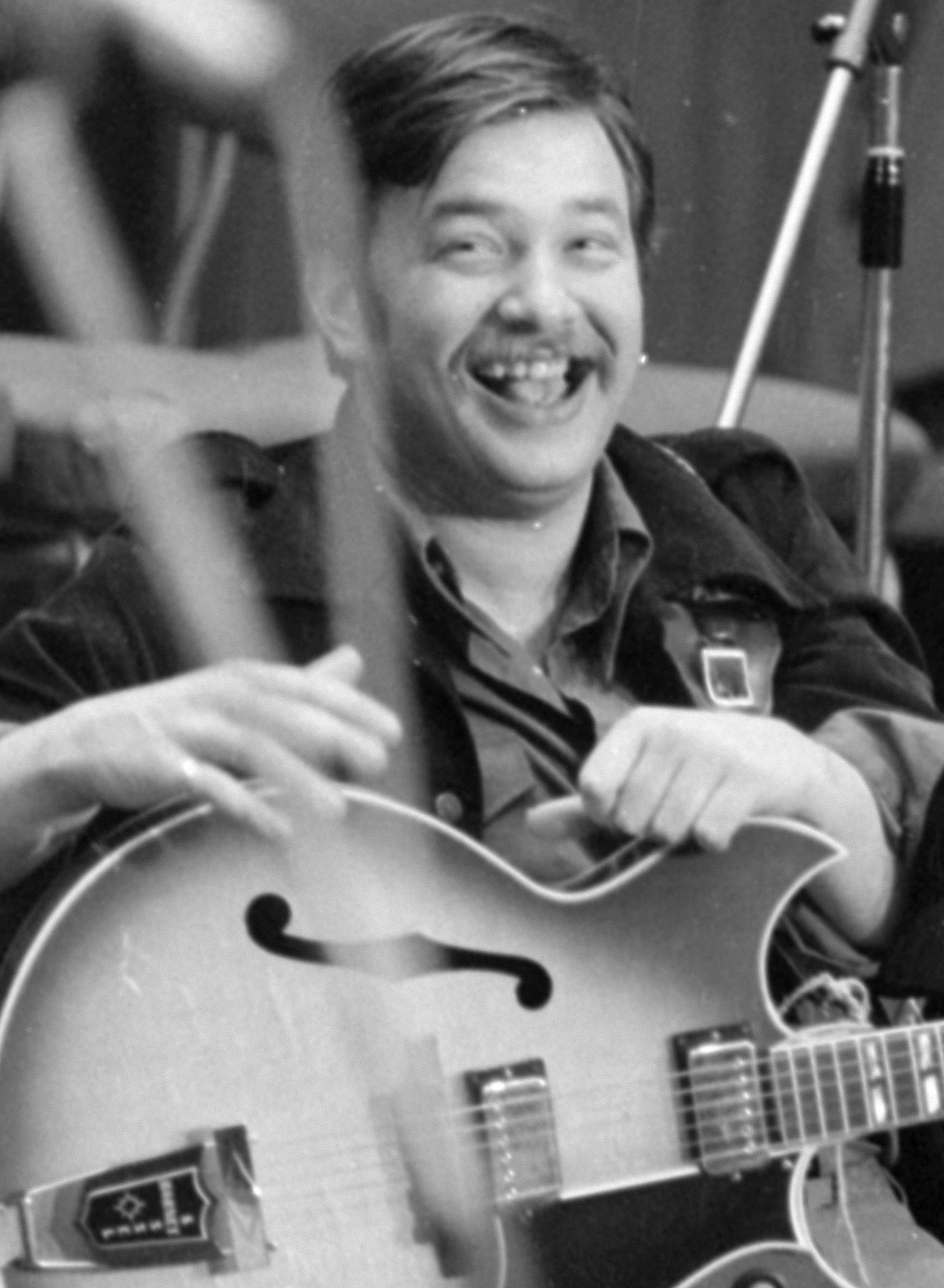
Gyula Babos

Gyula Babos (June 26, 1949 in Budapest - April 12, 2018 ibid) was a Hungarian jazz guitarist.

== Biography ==
Babos was a part of the bands Kex, Rákfogó and Saturnus, and won the Jazz Competition of the Hungarian Radio in 1966. Since 1977 he taught guitar at the Franz Liszt Academy of Music, where he became teacher of several generations of Hungarian guitarists. In the 1990s he gave some great concerts. He appeared in the Petofi Hall in Budapest with Victor Bailey, Terri Lyne Carrington, György Jinda and Béla Szakcsi Lakatos, and gave a concert with Frank Zappa in front of 50,000 spectators.

In 1997 he founded the Babos Romani Project, with which he recorded the album Once upon a time… (Egyszer volt…) in 1998. In the same year he recorded three albums with the group Take Four (Aladár Pege, Rudolf Tomsits and Imre Kőszegi), followed by recordings with Herbie Mann in 2001.

In 2004 he released the album Seventy-five Minutes (75 perc) with Trilok Gurtu. In 2005 he founded the Babos Project Special, which included pianist Róbert Szakcsi Lakatos, violinist Öcsi Patai, upright bass player Viktor Hárs, drummer László Balogh and singer Mónika Veress. In 2006 they released the album Variations.

Babos was awarded the Gábor Szabó Award in 2003 and the Order of Merit of the Republic of Hungary in 2005.

== Discography ==
- Kinn és benn, 1989
- Blue Victory, 1996
- Egyszer volt…, 1998
- Gyula Babos / Peter Dando / Peter Gritz – Saturnus-Csigahazak, 1999 (Hungaroton)
- 75 perc, 2004
- Variations, 2006
- Rapsodia, 2010
- Balance, 2014
