= Father (1966 film) =

1966 film

- Directed by: István Szabó
- Written by: István Szabó
- Starring: Miklós Gábor
- Cinematography: Sándor Sára
- Music by: János Gonda
- Production company: Mafilm
- Release date: 8 December 1966
- Running time: 88 minutes
- Country: Hungary
- Language: Hungarian

Father (Hungarian: Apa, pronounced [ˈɒpɒ]) is a 1966 Hungarian drama film written and directed by István Szabó. The film is a coming-of-age story. The main character copes with the childhood loss of his father against the backdrop of the Hungarian Revolution of 1956 and memories of the earlier dictatorship of the Arrow Cross Party modelled on the German Nazi Party.

== Cast ==
- András Bálint as Takó Bence
- Miklós Gábor as Apa
- Dániel Erdély as Agyerek Takó
- Kati Sólyom as Anni
- Klári Tolnay as Anya
- Zsuzsa Ráthonyi as Anya Fiatalon
- Ilona Petényi
- Rita Békés
- Judit Halász
- Anna Nagy
- Zsuzsa Balogh

== Reception ==
The film won the Grand Prix at the 5th Moscow International Film Festival and the Special Jury Prize at Locarno, and established Szabó as a director of international stature. The film was also selected as the Hungarian entry for the Best Foreign Language Film at the 40th Academy Awards, but was not accepted as a nominee. The film was chosen to be part both of Budapest Twelve, a list of Hungarian films considered the best in 1968 and its follow-up, the New Budapest Twelve in 2000.

== See also ==
- List of submissions to the 40th Academy Awards for Best Foreign Language Film
- List of Hungarian submissions for the Academy Award for Best Foreign Language Film
