= Záhorská Ves =

Záhorská Ves Magyarfalu
- Municipality
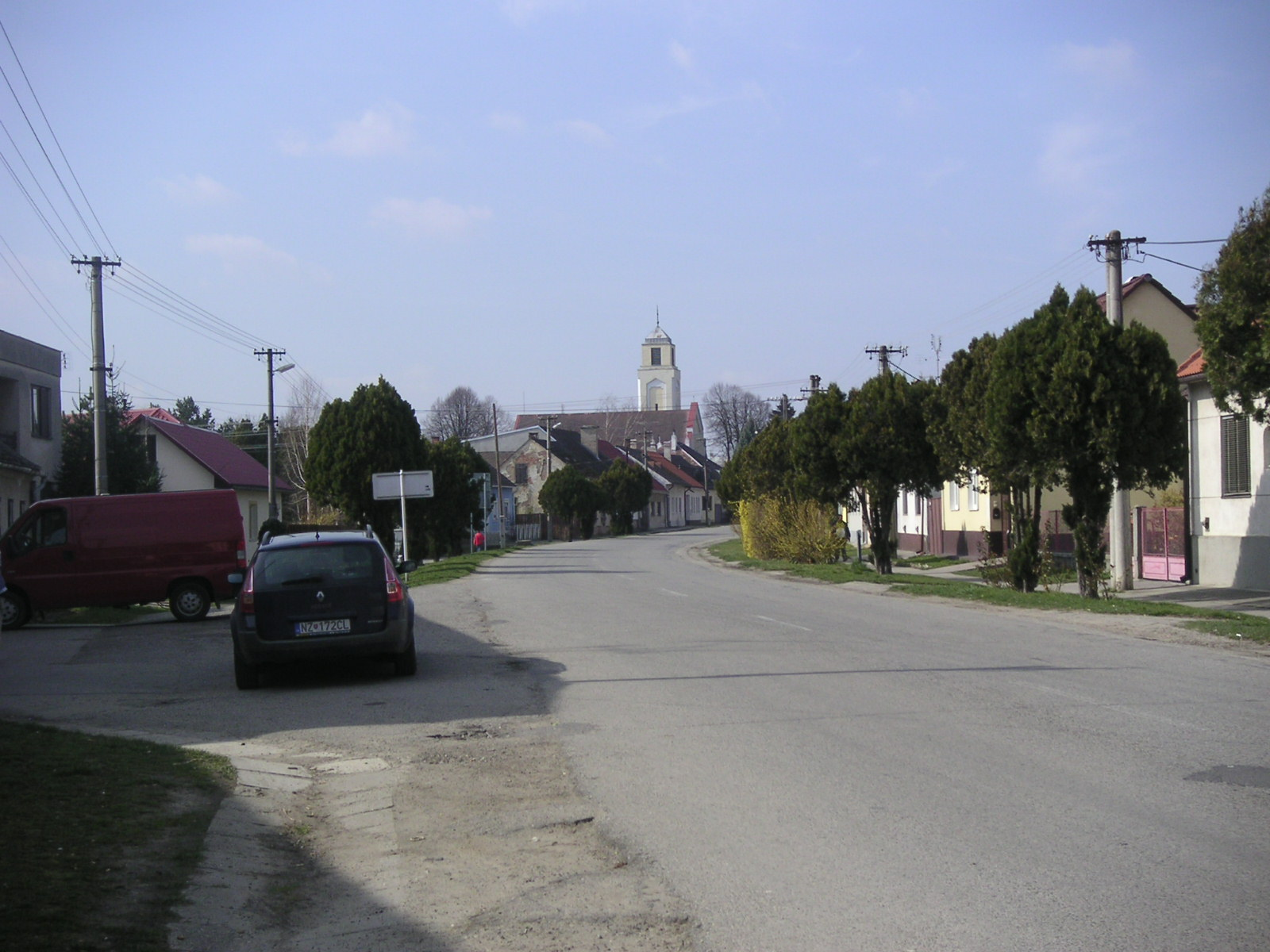

- Flag

- Location of Záhorská Ves in the Bratislava Region Location of Záhorská Ves in Slovakia
- Coordinates: 48.381°N 16.849°E
- Country: Slovakia
- Region: Bratislava Region
- District: Malacky District
- First mentioned: 1557

Area
  - Total: 13.05 km^{2} (5.04 sq mi)
- Elevation: 145 m (476 ft)

Population (2025)
  - Total: 1,868
- Time zone: UTC+1 (CET)
  - Summer (DST): UTC+2 (CEST)
- Postal code: 900 65
- Area code: +421 34
- Vehicle registration plate (until 2022): MA
- Website: www.zahorskaves.sk

Záhorská Ves (previous name: Uhorská Ves; German: Ungeraiden or Ungereigen; Hungarian: Magyarfalu) is a village situated north of Bratislava, the capital city of Slovakia. It is part of the Malacky District and Bratislava Region. The village is located on the Morava river, which forms the border between Slovakia and Austria. A river ferry operates between the village and Angern an der March in Austria.

Záhorská Ves is the westernmost settlement in Slovakia and is located near the westernmost point in Slovakia.

== Geography ==
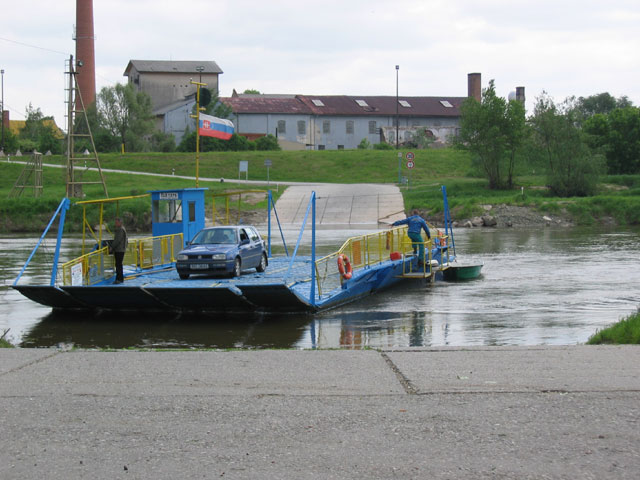
Ferry cross the Morava

The municipality lies at an altitude of 145 metres (476 ft) and covers an area of 13.05 km^{2} (5.04 sq mi) (2025).

== Population ==
Population statistic (10 years)
Year	1995	2005	2015	2025
Count	1463	1632	1841	1868
Difference		+11.55%	+12.80%	+1.46%

Population statistic
Year	2024	2025
Count	1882	1868
Difference		−0.74%

It has a population of 1868 people (31 December 2025).

=== Ethnicity ===
Census 2021 (1+%)
Ethnicity	Number	Fraction
Slovak	1737	92.14%
Not found out	110	5.83%
Romani	42	2.22%
Total	1885	

In year 2021 was 1885 people by ethnicity 1737 as Slovak, 110 as Not found out, 42 as Romani, 16 as Czech, 6 as Croatian, 5 as Serbian, 5 as Russian, 5 as Hungarian, 4 as Rusyn, 4 as German, 3 as Ukrainian, 3 as Other, 2 as Italian, 2 as Polish, 1 as Romanian, 1 as Austrian and 1 as Albanian.

Note on population: The difference values of population numbers in the table "Population statistic" and in the sections "Ethnicity" & "Religion" is caused by the use of various statistical methods.

=== Religion ===
Census 2021 (1+%)
Religion	Number	Fraction
Roman Catholic Church	1046	55.49%
None	634	33.63%
Not found out	109	5.78%
Evangelical Church	26	1.38%
Total	1885	

In year 2021 was 1885 people by religion 1046 from Roman Catholic Church, 634 from None, 109 from Not found out, 26 from Evangelical Church, 16 from Eastern Orthodox Church, 16 from Greek Catholic Church, 11 from Christian Congregations in Slovakia, 7 from Other, 4 from Old Catholic Church, 4 from Ad hoc movements, 3 from Paganism and natural spirituality, 2 from Buddhism, 1 from Calvinist Church, 1 from Other and not ascertained christian church, 1 from Jehovah's Witnesses, 1 from Islam, 1 from Hinduism, 1 from United Methodist Church and 1 from Church of Jesus Christ of Latter-day Saints.

== Notable people ==
- Lucia Popp (1939–1993), opera singer
