= János Gonda =

Hungarian jazz pianist (1932–2021)

János Gonda (11 January 1932 – 10 March 2021) was a Hungarian jazz pianist. Born in Budapest, he studied at the Franz Liszt Academy of Music and earned his diploma first at the musicological and then in the piano department. His activities include composition, concert performances, teaching, and musicological research.

== Music ==
He formed his first band in 1962, and with them made the first LP in the Hungarian "Modern Jazz" series. He led several bands which are featured on anthology albums in the same series. In the late 1960s, he co-led the Gonda-Krusa Quartet with the Polish vibraphonist Richard Kruza. He also recorded with his Gonda Sextet, which he formed in 1972. One of their famous recordings is titled Shaman Song. The sextet consisted of János Gonda (piano, electrical piano), Gábor Balázs (bass), Tamás Berki (vocal, guitar, percussion), Péter Kántor (soprano and alto saxophone), István Dely (conga, percussion) and Gyula Kovács (drums, percussion).

As a composer, he mainly wrote jazz pieces, but also branched out into other musical forms. He wrote film scores, such as for the István Szabó film Father (Apa 1966), and other incidental music, his dance compositions and symphonic jazz works. The most significant of the last is his Australian Concerto of 1970. In 1974, he composed a musical entitled Pro Urbe.

== Teaching and research ==
Gonda's theoretical works also focused on jazz. Of his books and studies, the book Jazz, published in 1979, was the best-known.

He was a professor and head of the jazz department at the Béla Bartók Conservatory in Budapest, Hungary, and vice president of the International Jazz Federation.

Gonda was head of the jazz department affiliated with the Association of Hungarian Musicians. From 1965 to 1997, he was leader of the jazz department of the Franz Liszt Academy of Music. Gonda was the artistic director of Tatabánya International Jazz Camp and Tatabánya International Institute of Creative Music Education.

== Awards ==
In 1974, he was awarded the Hungarian Erkel Prize.

== Discography ==
- 1964 Modern jazz IV-V. - Anthology 64 Hungaroton LPX 7279-80 Közreműködő
- 1967 Modern jazz VI. - Anthology 67 Hungaroton LPX 17372 Közreműködő
- 1968 Modern jazz VII. - Anthology 68 Hungaroton LPX 17392 Közreműködő
- 1969 Modern jazz VIII. - Anthology 69 Hungaroton LPX 17406 Közreműködő
- 1976 Sámánének (Shaman Song) Hungaroton-Pepita
- 1980 Vonzások és választósok Hungaroton-Pepita
- 1980 Solo Piano Hungaroton-Pepita
- 1986 Keyboard Music Hungaroton-Krém
- 1999 Képek, Emlékek (Pictures, Memories) Binder Music Manufactory BMM 9904-26173630 Saját

Film scores

- 1975 A járvány
- 1974 Holnap lesz fácán
- 1972 Utazás Jakabbal
- 1970 Mérsékelt égöv
- 1970 Horizont
- 1970 Szerelmesfilm
- 1970 A gyilkos a házban van
- 1967 A múmia közbeszól
- 1966 Apa - egy hit naplója
- 1965 Szentjános fejevétele
- 1964 Karambol
- 1963 Nappali sötétség

== Writing ==
- 1979 Jazz
- 1982 Mi a Jazz? (What is Jazz?)
- 2004 Jazzvilág (World of Jazz) RÓZSAVÖLGYI ÉS TÁRSA publishers, ISBN 963-86238-5-3
