= Lovefilm (film) =

Szerelmesfilm also called as 'Lovefilm' or also as ' A film about love'.
- Directed by: István Szabó
- Written by: István Szabó
- Starring: András Bálint, Judit Halász, Edit Kelemen, András Szamosfalvi
- Cinematography: József Lörincz
- Edited by: György Sívó
- Music by: János Gonda
- Release date: 8 October 1970
- Running time: 123 minutes
- Country: Hungary
- Language: Hungarian

Lovefilm (Hungarian: Szerelmesfilm) is a 1970 Hungarian drama film written and directed by István Szabó. The film was selected as the Hungarian entry for the Best Foreign Language Film at the 43rd Academy Awards, but was not accepted as a nominee.

== Cast ==
- András Bálint as Jancsi
- Judit Halász as Kata
- Edit Kelemen as younger Kata
- András Szamosfalvi as younger Jancsi
- Flóra Kádár

== Analysis ==
Lovefilm uses cinematic imagery to approach the unspoken and untold aspects of love and hope between individuals. It depicts love between two childhood sweethearts who continue to share strong bond and friendship through their adulthood though they quite do not define it as a love relationship for the most part. They continue to refer to their relation as friends or childhood friendship or even introduce each other to their friends as 'like my brother' and 'like my sister'. The film's editing is non-linear and has constant transitions back and forth between images of childhood memories during World War II Nazi occupied Hungary and the Soviet communist party controlled 1950s schooling and the early 1960s university days. It also echoes the tense times of 1956 in Hungary and the feeling of nostalgia in the early 1970s.

== Release and Production ==
The film originally premiered at the Venice Film Festival and was then screened out of competition at the Locarno Film Festival after director Istvan Szabo cut 10 minutes from its premiere run time to improve it with audiences.

== See also ==
- List of submissions to the 43rd Academy Awards for Best Foreign Language Film
- List of Hungarian submissions for the Academy Award for Best Foreign Language Film
