= György Fischer =

Hungarian pianist and conductor (1935–2020)

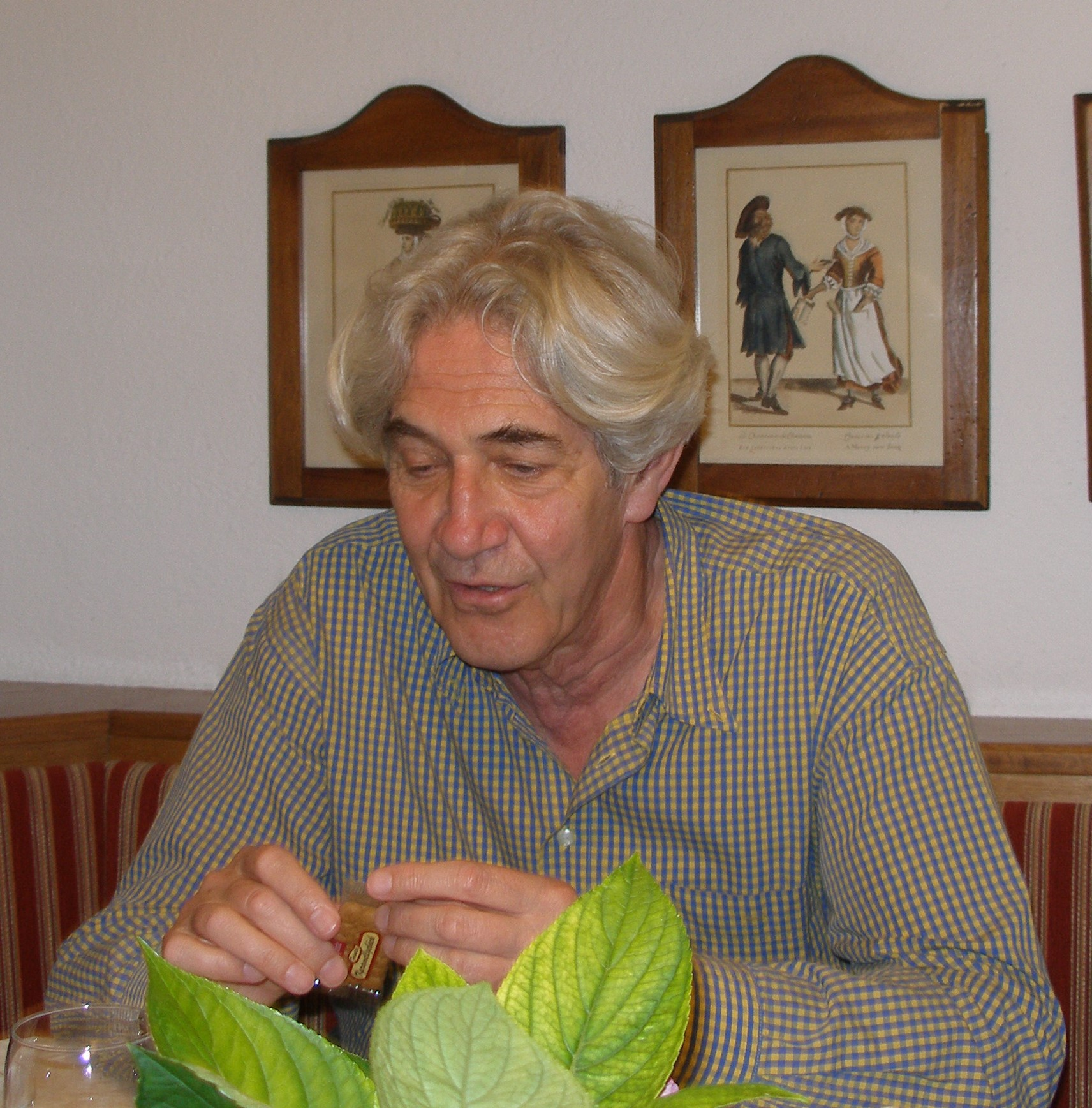
- György Fischer in 2005
- Born: 12 August 1935; Budapest
- Died: 25 October 2020 (aged 85); Cologne
- Other names: Gyorgy Fischer; Fischer György; Gyorgy J. Fischer; Georg Fischer
- Occupations: Pianist, conductor
- Partner(s): Lucia Popp; Ida Bieler
- Parent: Pál Fischer (1892–1945)

György Fischer (12 August 1935 – 25 October 2020) was a Hungarian pianist and conductor.

== Life ==
Assistant to Herbert von Karajan at the Vienna Opera, he became a specialist in the works of Mozart, conducting operas in Cologne, Munich, and South America. He performed with the Australian Opera in 1987.

First he married opera singer Lucia Popp. After being divorced from her, he married American violinist Ida Bieler. His sister-in-law was Hungarian actress Flóra Kádár, the first wife of his elder brother, DOP and photojournalist Péter Fischer.

== Bibliography ==
Media related to György Fischer (pianist) at Wikimedia Commons

- Cummings, David M. (2000). Fischer, György. International Who's who in Music and Musicians' Directory (in the Classical and Light Classical Fields 2000/2001 Volume One (Seventeenth Edition). Cambridge: International Biographical Centre/Melrose Press. p. 200. ISBN 9780948875533.
