= István, a király =

Hungarian rock opera

Stephen, the King
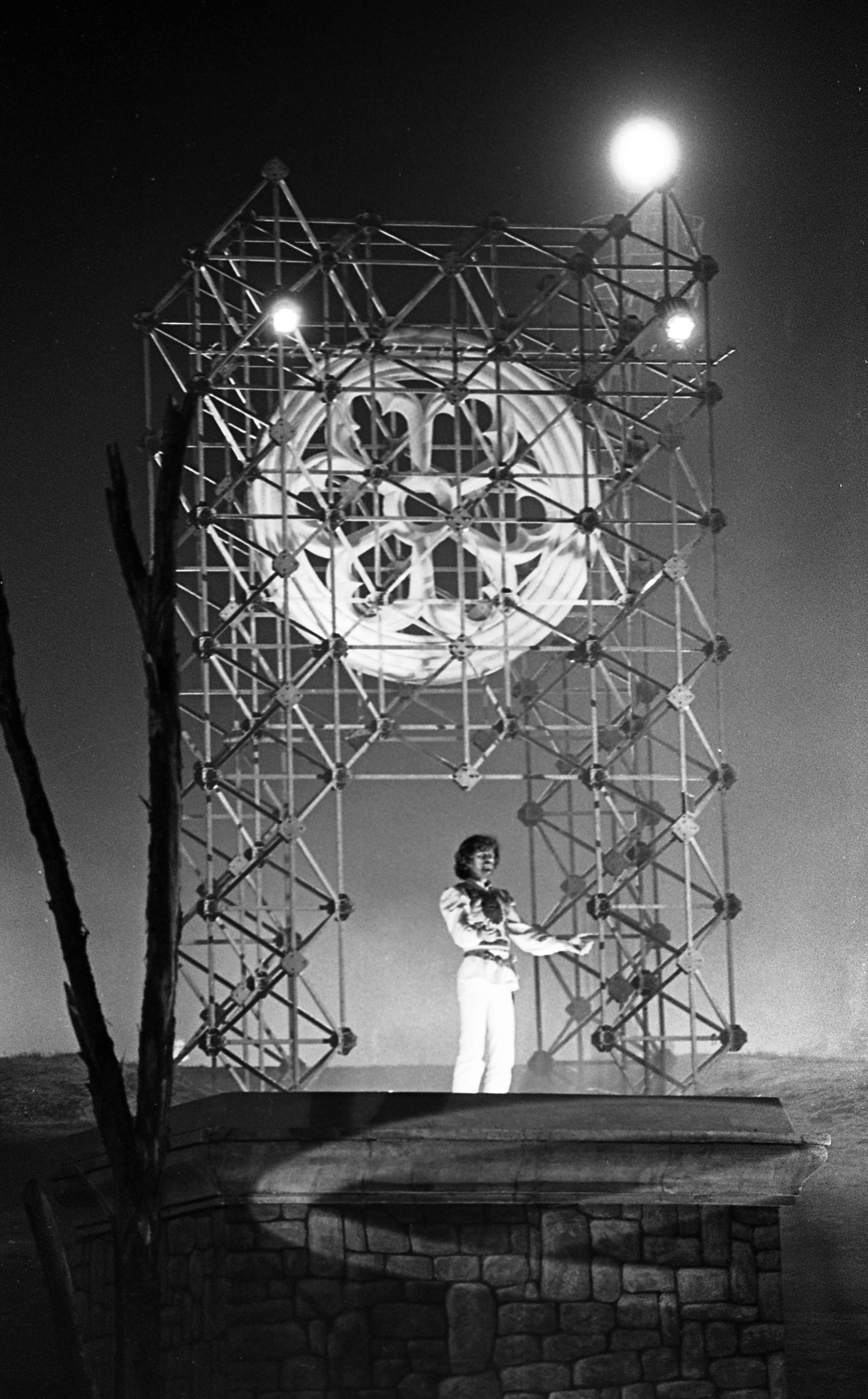
- László Pelsőczy plays the title role of Stephen in István, a király, which he played at the King's Hill and at the Szeged Open Air Festival
- Music: Levente Szörényi
- Lyrics: János Bródy
- Book: János Bródy; Boldizsár Miklós
- Setting: Hungary, cca. 1000
- Basis: Ezredforduló by Boldizsár Miklós
- Premiere: August 18, 1983: Városliget

István, a király ("Stephen, the King") is a Hungarian rock opera with music by Levente Szörényi, lyrics by János Bródy and book by Bródy and Miklós Boldizsár, based on the latter's play, Ezredforduló.

The musical is based on the life of Saint Stephen of Hungary. The scenery was created by Johannes Lorenz Klotz.

The opera was first staged in 1983 on an open-air stage in Budapest. This first performance was also made into a 1984 film, directed by Gábor Koltay, and its music released on an album. The musical became a smash hit and is still very popular in Hungary and among Hungarian minorities in neighboring countries.

== Historical background ==
The opera is based on actual historical events, yet treats them quite freely. In the late 10th century, Géza, ruling prince (fejedelem) of the pagan Magyar (Hungarian) people recognized that his people would not have a future if they did not found a Christian state. He invited Catholic missionaries to his lands and let his son Vajk be baptized István (Stephen) and brought up as a Catholic.

Géza planned to have István take over the country after his death, as was custom in Western hereditary monarchies. According to ancient Hungarian custom, however, the oldest male member of the family - in this case, a relative named Koppány - would have been the successor.

After Géza's death, Koppány started an uprising against István, but lost and was killed in battle. In order to deter the pagans from further uprising, his body was quartered and the pieces exposed upon the walls of the main castles of the country.

In the year 1000 or 1001, István received a crown from the Pope. He was crowned the first king of Hungary.

== Synopsis ==
=== Dramatis personae ===
István	Hungarian prince, later ruling king of Hungary
Gizella	his wife, a Bavarian princess
Sarolt	István's mother
Asztrik	bishop
Hont	German knights
Pázmány	German knights
Vecellin	German knights
Koppány	a pagan relative of István's
Réka	Koppány's daughter, a Christian
Laborc	a follower of Koppány's
Torda	a pagan shaman
Picur	Koppány's wives
Enikő	Koppány's wives
Boglárka	Koppány's wives
Súr	Hungarian noblemen, opportunists
Solt	Hungarian noblemen, opportunists
Bese	Hungarian noblemen, opportunists
people, followers, soldiers, priests

The piece is set in Hungary, around the year 1000.

=== Act I, Az örökség (the heritage) ===
A singer sings about good leadership for the country and asks "Whom would you choose?" (Te kit választanál?) The ruling prince of Hungary, Géza, has invited Christian missionaries into the country (Veni lumen cordium/Töltsd el szívünk, fényesség). In order to strengthen ties with the West, his son István is marrying the Bavarian princess Gizella.

Súr, Solt and Bese, a group of opportunist noblemen, talk about human frailty - every man chooses the side that seems the most promising. Principles are unimportant (Gyarló az ember).

The daughter of István's relative Koppány, Réka, has also converted to Christianity and is praying to the new God. Laborc, a follower of her father's, tells her they don't need a foreign god - she should rather trust her father (Nem vagyunk még hozzád méltók/Nem kell olyan isten).

Géza has died, the country is in mourning (Géza fejedelem temetése - Kyrie eleison). István promises at his grave to be a good prince to his people, yet he is defied by Koppány, who claims to be the rightful successor of Géza's. The followers of both gather behind them and hail them (Nincs más út csak az Isten útja).

=== Act II, Esztergom ===
Réka, Gizella, the priests and the people are saddened and pray for peace (Adj békét Uram/Da pacem, Domine).

A group of singers hail István, yet they also sing about past glory (Üdvöz légyen Géza fia). István's tempestuous mother Sarolt is suspicious of such pagan attitudes. Laborc arrives in Koppány's name, proposing Sarolt a marriage with his lord (Koppány küldött, jó úrnőm). Koppány hopes that by marrying Géza's widow, he may be accepted as his successor. Sarolt finds the proposal outrageous. Laborc is executed immediately.

The three noblemen start making fun of Koppány in front of István, describing him as uncivilized and stupid (Abcúg Koppány). István is disgusted with them and chases them away.

István is torn apart by the situation. His deep faith and his loyalty towards his family forbid him to fight, yet there don't seem to be any other possibilities. Sarolt admonishes him to be cunning. She tells him to prepare for war (István fiam!).

Gizella declares herself "bored with politics" and is upset with István: she would like them to have a baby. The German knight Vecellin is also rather unnerved by the fact that they have not yet started a war (Unom a politikát).

In triumph, István is elected as the ruling prince of the Hungarians. The people hail him as their new lord (Fejedelmünk István!).

After the feast, István goes away to be alone. He is sad and undecided and converses with God about what to do. Réka observes him. She is secretly in love with István - her father's archenemy -, yet has to keep her feelings secret (Oly távol vagy tőlem (és mégis közel)).

=== Act III, Koppány vezér (Koppány, the chief) ===
Koppány convokes his followers. He promises a glorious future to them and prepares them for the fight. The people respond enthusiastically (Szállj fel, szabad madár).

Koppány sits in his tent with his three pretty young wives. They extol his qualities as a husband and lover and express their desire for him (Te vagy a legszebb álmunk). Koppány is rather distracted and he is soon unnerved by their chattering. He sends them away.

The three opportunists now appear in front of Koppány. They propose him different ways of assassinating István (Abcúg István). Koppány sends them away - he wants to fight honorably. He also confirms this in front of the shaman Torda and the people - he wants to stand "face to face" with István and his army (Szemtől szembe). Torda prays to the pagan gods for victory and brings them sacrifice (Áldozatunk fogadjátok).

Réka has had a nightmare in which she saw her father dead. She implores him not to pursue the conflict. István proposes Koppány the crown if he submits to the Church of Rome. But Koppány's hatred of priests and his determination to win the country are stronger. He tells them that it is "too late" for peace now (Elkésett békevágy).

Torda presents Koppány's followers the bloody sword, the symbol of war. If they win, Hungary will have a glorious future, he prophesies. The war breaks out and ends with István's victory (Véres kardot hoztam/Vezess minket, István!).

=== Act IV, István a király (István, the king) ===
Koppány's side has lost, he has died in battle. A singer laments the dead (Gyászba öltözött csillagom). István's followers celebrate at his court. Everyone demands his due (Hála néked, fejedelem!). Finally, Réka appears and asks István to give her her dead father's body. He is moved by her sorrow and beauty, but Sarolt brutally chases her away: Koppány would be quartered, as a deterrent for potential rebels (Halld meg uram, kérésem/Felnégyelni!).

István is shattered and demands to be alone. He desperately prays to God (Oly távol vagy tőlem - reprise). Finally, he backs his mother's decision.

Koppány's body is quartered (Koppány felnégyelése/Gloria gloria). Finally, István is triumphally crowned king of Hungary (István a király).

== Political background and interpretation ==
The choice of a theme that was both strongly connected with national history and with the Christian religion seemed rather daring in the Hungary of the early 1980s. Furthermore, the topic of a fight between two antagonists for the country harkened back to the Hungarian revolution of 1956 which had been crushed by Communist party chief János Kádár, who was still in power at the time István, a király was written.

On the other hand, the fact that the character of István was presented as a thoughtful man who nevertheless does "what a man's gotta do" made the interpretation that he stood for Kádár who also "had to do what he'd gotta do" quite compelling for the regime. Though István's antagonist Koppány is presented as a noble, honest soul, he could also be seen as being somewhat "behind the times", as a person who does not understand what the country needs most. In such an allegorical interpretation, the German knights and the Catholic priests could be put into parallel with the Soviet army stationed in Hungary, and the vital connection of Hungary with the papacy with the country's relationship with the Soviet Union.

However, the rock opera can also be read as a subversive piece that introduced daring themes such as an open uprising against the state or religion into a mainstream theater piece. Especially among the minority Hungarians in the neighboring countries, István, a király was understood as an expression of nationhood and patriotism, explicitly spelled out in the last words of its last song: "Szép Magyarország, édes hazánk." ("Beautiful Hungary, our sweet home.")

== István, a király as a work of art ==
=== Music ===
Composer Levente Szörényi, who had already worked together with János Bródy (lyrics) for more than two decades when they wrote István, a király (most famously in the bands Illés and Fonográf), chose to characterize every major character and group in the play by its own style of music. Thus, the music of the rock opera encompasses a great variety of styles, ranging from Gregorian chant to hard rock.

István's hopes and fears are expressed in melodious pop songs, while Koppány's power and determination is shown through rock pieces. Réka is characterized by simple folk tunes as a girl of the people (her part was sung by famous folk singer Márta Sebestyén in the original version - she is best known internationally from the soundtrack of the movie The English Patient and for her frequent collaborations with the well-known folk music ensemble Muzsikás). The priests and missionaries sing music akin to Gregorian chant. The mass scenes of the election in Act II and the coronation in Act IV soar to symphonical heights at some moments.

The transition from the old to the new is often compellingly expressed musically, for example in the funeral scene where a traditional Hungarian folk melody is blended into and then vanishes behind a Gregorian "Kyrie eleison".

The wide range of musical styles also explains the large orchestra that is needed for the opera - it has to encompass both most features of a classical orchestra and of a rock band.

=== Lyrics ===
János Bródy has been acknowledged as one of the most talented lyrics writers of Hungary and István, a király was certainly written in his prime. His subtlety of characterization makes a one-sided interpretation difficult and contributes to the credibility of the characters. Especially the main characters István and Koppány appear as complex figures: István as a pious, deeply affected, somewhat "Hamlet-y", yet finally determined man; Koppány as a passionate character who knows what he wants, yet is not power-hungry, but is rather led by his respect for tradition and the fear that tradition would disappear through the "foreigners" István is bringing into the land.

Bródy, himself a secular Jew, is especially subtle in his characterization of the Catholic Church. The rock opera can both be read as traditional "priest criticism", or as a piece that is deeply respectful of faith. In this way, directors are free to determine how to present and represent the priests and missionaries. The original version that was made into a 1984 film favored a neutral position in this respect.

== Productions ==
Date	Location	Event	Director	Choreographer	# of perf.	Total attendance	Ref.
18–28 August 1983	City Park, Budapest	—N/a	Gábor Koltay	Ferenc Novák	7	100,000– 120,000	
21 July – 20 August 1984	Dóm Square, Szeged	Szeged Open-Air Festival	Gábor Koltay	Ferenc Novák	6	36,000	
16 September 1989	Chapel Hill, Sitke	Sitke Rock Festival	Gábor Koltay	Unknown	1	14,000– 20,000	
14–15 September 1990	People's Stadium, Budapest	—N/a	Gábor Koltay	Ferenc Novák	2	130,000	
22–23 May 1992	Plaza de San Francisco, Seville	Seville Expo '92	Gábor Koltay	Ferenc Novák	2	9000– 12,000	
17–20 August 2002	Szent István Square, Esztergom	Esztergom Summer Festival	István Iglódi	Sándor Román	2		
5 July 2003	Saddle of Csíksomlyó	Day of 1000 Székely Girls	Ferenc Novák		1	350,000– 500,000	
19–20 August 2003	Szent István Square, Esztergom	Esztergom Summer Festival	István Iglódi	Sándor Román	2		
17–19 June 2008	László Papp Budapest Sports Arena	25th anniversary	János Szikora	Zoltán Zsuráfszky	3	36,000	
