= Béla Szakcsi Lakatos =

Hungarian jazz pianist, composer (1943–2022)

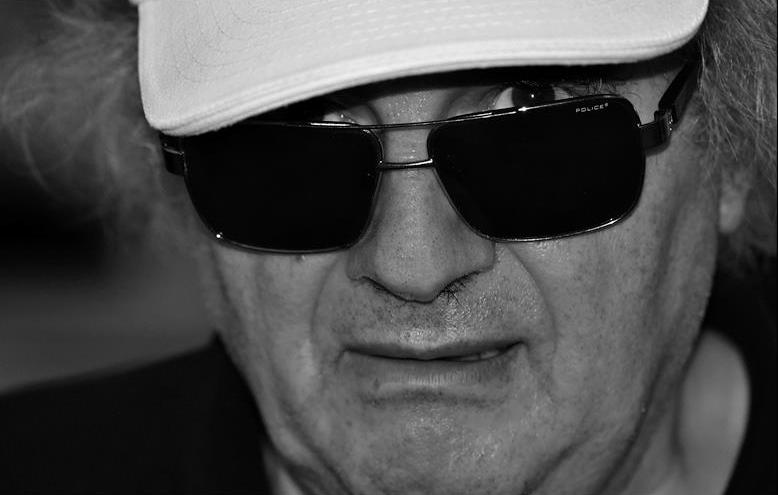
- Born: 8 July 1943; Budapest, Hungary
- Died: 2 October 2022 (aged 79); Budapest, Hungary
- Occupation: Pianist

Béla Szakcsi Lakatos (8 July 1943 – 2 October 2022), also known by the mononyms Szakcsi or Sa-Chi, was a Hungarian jazz pianist, keyboardist, arranger and composer.

== Life and career ==
Born in Budapest, Szakcsi Lakatos studied at the Béla Bartók Conservatory and started his professional career in the mid-sixties. In the 1970s he was part of the Aladár Pege’s quartet, with whom he performed at the Montreux Jazz Festival to great critical acclaim. Later he was part of the bands Rákfogó and Saturnus, as well as leader of his own ensemble. He recorded 16 albums and composed several musicals.

Szakcsi is regarded as a key figure in promoting the jazz and fusion genres in Hungary. During his career he received numerous honours and accolades, including the Kossuth Prize and the Merit Artist of Hungary Award. He died on 2 October 2022, at the age of 79.
