= Tamás Berki =

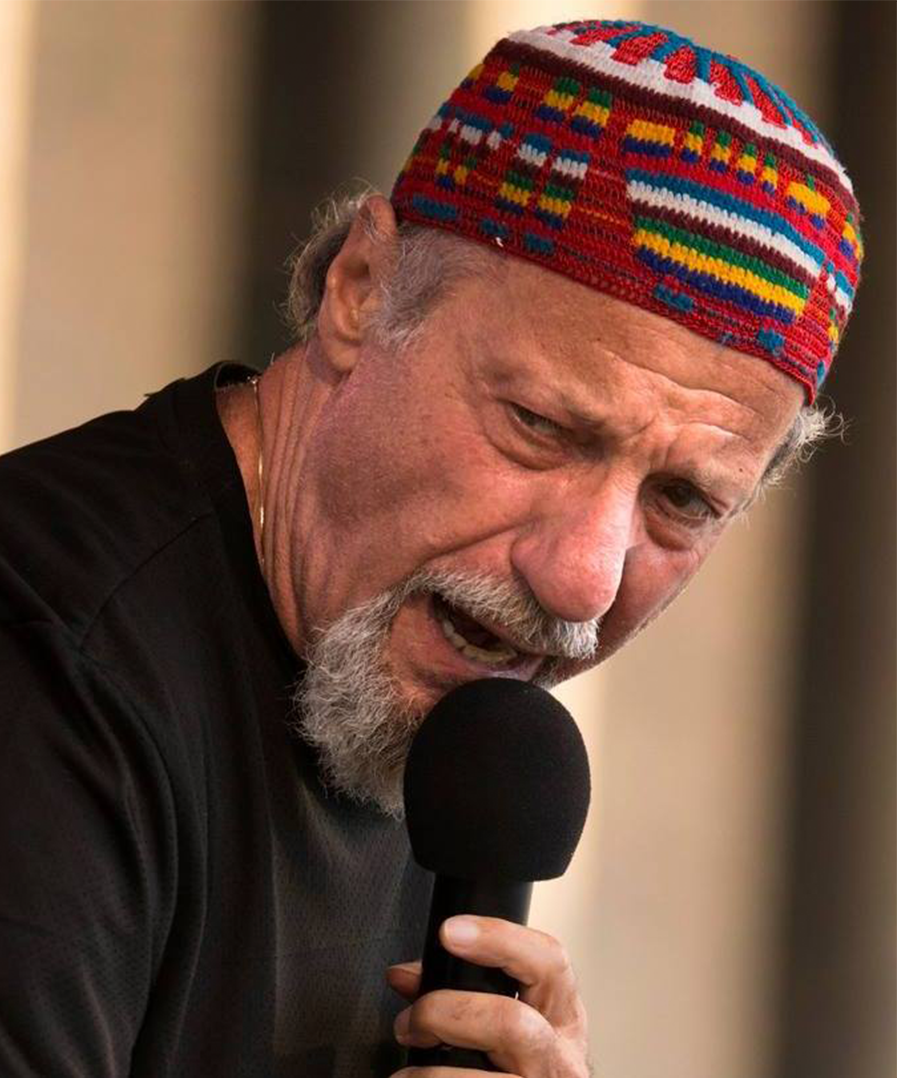
- Berki in June 2015
- Born: Tamás István Berki; May 16, 1946 (age 80); Budapest, Hungary
- Occupations: Singer; songwriter; drummer
- Years active: 1966-present
- Spouse: Erzsébet Kurucz (m. 1975)
- Children: 2
- Honours: Knight's Cross of the Hungarian Order of Merit
- Musical career
- Genres: Jazz; blues
- Labels: Hungaroton; Tom-Tom

Tamás István Berki (born 16 May 1946) is a Hungarian singer, songwriter, guitarist, drummer, television personality and teacher.

== Early life ==
Tamás István Berki was born in Budapest, Hungary to Dezső Berki (1910 – 12 April 1994) and Irén Tröster (14 February 1917 – 22 December 1994), just after the end of the Second World War.

From 1969 to 1972, Berki mastered the nuances of jazz music at the Béla Bartók Conservatory, under the guidance of the likes of János Gonda and György Vukán. After his graduation, he was invited to work as a teaching assistant at the Conservatory and proceeded to stay there for the next five years.

== Career ==
=== Early career (1966-1984) ===
In 1966, Berki founded the Gerilla Band with Tibor Vámos (the eventual author, Miklós Vámos) and bassist, Ágnes Gergely.

With the help of a classmate, Berki joined Interbrass in 1973, which greatly helped him in finding his own path in music. In the following years, Berki acted as a soloist for a variety of smaller and larger bands. His work with Sándor Benkó's Benkó Dixieland Band contributed greatly to his early rise in the world of jazz. He was slowly but surely establishing a foothold for himself in the world of Hungarian music.

=== Solo career (1984-present) ===
In 1984, Berki presented his first solo album to Imre Wilpert of Hungaroton, who in turn forwarded his material into a song contest – without his knowledge – which was eventually won by Berki's "Igazi paradicsom (Real Paradise)". This launched his solo career, leading to the releases of seven other solo albums and his eventual establishment as one of the foremost names of Hungarian jazz.

In 1996, Berki appeared on the soundtrack of the Hungarian dub of Toy Story.

After 1996, Berki began to focus increasingly on teaching and guiding the next generation of Hungarian singers. He commenced teaching singing at the Music Studio of Kőbánya in 1996 and jazz at the Franz Liszt Academy of Music in 1997. He retired from his teaching position at the university in 2019.

In 1988, Berki released his second solo album, "Hé, Mi a Bigyó?", swiftly succeeding it with a third album in 1990, "Jó Reggelt". His 1995 and 1996 albums, "Mende-Sülysáp Blues" and "Berki Sings Jazz", further solidified his portfolio. Following a brief period of silence, in 2004, Berki returned with a long-awaited solo album titled, "A Híd". This was followed by another album in 2009, entitled "Bika Jam", which dealt with the singer's birth and the experiences of his family during the Second World War.

His 2014 album, "Minden Délibáb," was a joint project between him and Hungarian pianist Péter Sárik. Since 2012, they have been appearing together as a performing duo in numerous shows. Berki has formed a close friendship with Sárik, even featuring the pianist at his 70th Birthday Concert in 2016.

At the end of 2023, Berki released a novel studio album titled "Hintaló", which dealt with themes of nostalgia and reflection as the singer examined his life through his music. From the outset, he aimed to create a heavily biographical album, as the singer began working on the album in 2019, after the death of his sister. In January 2024, for this particular release, Berki was proclaimed Male Singer of the Year by JazzMa.hu.

For the albums "Bika Jam" and "Minden Délibáb" – for which he acted as the producer – Berki drew the album covers himself.

It is estimated that Berki has held more than 4,000 concerts throughout his longevous career.

Berki uses the scat technique of vocal improvisation extensively in his songs.

=== Television career (1994-2000) ===
From 1994 to 1998, Berki became Duna TV's popular music editor and from 1998-2000, the broadcaster's jazz editor.

=== Writing career (2022-present) ===
During the pandemic, Berki wrote a novel titled Hangszálak, which was subsequently published in 2022. Although the book is a work of fiction, the narrative is constructed from the singer's own life experiences and stories. Berki is not planning on writing a sequel for the book as he humorously commented on keeping Hangszálak his "first and last novel".

== Personal life ==
Berki married Erzsébet Kurucz in 1975. The couple had a son, Balázs (born 1976) and a daughter, Lili Emily (born 1990).

== Discography ==
=== Gerilla Band ===
Year	Title
1966	"Mr. John elment Vietnámba / Ejtőernyős dal"
1967	"Disszidensek (Ecc-pecc-kimehecc...) / Várunk este a szobornál / Nem lehet tudni"
1971	"Antal Gazda"
1971	"Umlaut tu phenye / Gazsi cigány"

=== Gonda Sextet Band ===
Year	Title	Album
1976	"Shaman Song (Sámánének)"	Sámánének
1976	"Confused Heads (Elcserélt Fejek)"	Sámánének
1976	"Afro-Cuban"	Sámánének
1976	"Profane Feast (Profán Ünnep)"	Sámánének

=== Benkó Dixieland Band ===
Berki first became involved with Benkó Dixieland in 1973. He never joined the band, nonetheless, Berki continued to frequently appear on the band's albums as a soloist.

==== Heart of My Heart (1991) ====
Year	Title	Album
1991	"Heart of My Heart"	Heart of My Heart
1991	"Mame"	Heart of My Heart
1991	"Ain't Gonna Give Nobody None of My Jelly Roll"	Heart of My Heart
1991	"You Look Good to Me"	Heart of My Heart
1991	"All That Jazz"	Heart of My Heart
1991	"On the Sunny Side of the Street"	Heart of My Heart
1991	"All of Me"	Heart of My Heart
1991	"Louisiana"	Heart of My Heart
1991	"Summertime"	Heart of My Heart
1991	"Hallelujah I Love Him So"	Heart of My Heart
1991	"Hymn to Freedom"	Heart of My Heart
1991	"Tootsie, Tootsie, Tootsie Good-Bye"	Heart of My Heart
1991	"Don't Get Much Anymore"	Heart of My Heart
1991	"Little Dolphin"	Heart of My Heart
1991	"Some of These Days"	Heart of My Heart
1991	"Down by the Riverside"	Heart of My Heart

==== Christmas Mass (1991) ====
Year	Title	Album
1991	"White Christmas Tonight (Fehér Karácsony Éjjelén)"	Christmas Mass (Karácsonyi Mise - Igeliturgia)
1991	"On Shine Forth (Világosság Ragyog felettünk)"	Christmas Mass (Karácsonyi Mise - Igeliturgia)
1991	"Sing a New Hymn (Énekeljetek az Úrnak Új Éneket)"	Christmas Mass (Karácsonyi Mise - Igeliturgia)
1991	"My Sweet Lord (Édes Uram)"	Christmas Mass (Karácsonyi Mise - Igeliturgia)
1991	"Lord Have Mercy (Uram Könyörögj)"	Christmas Mass (Karácsonyi Mise - Igeliturgia)
1991	"Lift Up Your Eyes (Szemeinket Az Égre Emeljük)"	Christmas Mass (Karácsonyi Mise - Igeliturgia)
1991	"Glory Halleluja"	Christmas Mass (Karácsonyi Mise - Igeliturgia)
1991	"With Joy We Await (Örvendezve Várunk)"	Christmas Mass (Karácsonyi Mise - Igeliturgia)
1991	"Our Hearts Are Full Of Joy (Szívünk Boldogsággal Van Tele)"	Christmas Mass (Karácsonyi Mise - Igeliturgia)
1991	"Sweet Little Jesus, Born In A Manger (Édes Kis Jézus, Ki Jászolban Születtél)"	Christmas Mass (Karácsonyi Mise - Igeliturgia)
1991	"The Day Of Love (A Szeretet ünnepén)"	Christmas Mass (Karácsonyi Mise - Igeliturgia)
1991	"Sweet Jesus, Holy Child (Édes Jézus, Szent Gyermek)"	Christmas Mass (Karácsonyi Mise - Igeliturgia)
1991	"Praise Be To God (Istennek Hála)"	Christmas Mass (Karácsonyi Mise - Igeliturgia)
1991	"Glory To God In The Highest (Dicsőség A Magasságos Istennek)"	Christmas Mass (Karácsonyi Mise - Igeliturgia)
1991	"Hossanna In Heaven (Hozsanna A Magasságban)"	Christmas Mass (Karácsonyi Mise - Igeliturgia)
1991	"The Last Supper (Utolsó Vacsora)"	Christmas Mass (Karácsonyi Mise - Igeliturgia)
1991	"The Lord's Prayer (Miatyánk)"	Christmas Mass (Karácsonyi Mise - Igeliturgia)
1991	"Free Forever (Szabadság Mindörökké)"	Christmas Mass (Karácsonyi Mise - Igeliturgia)

==== Take The A-Train (1996) ====
Year	Title	Album
1996	"Take The A-Train (17 untitled tracks)"	Take The A-Train

==== Benkó Dixieland Band 50th Anniversary Concert (2007) ====
Year	Title	Album
2007	"Go Down Moses"	Benkó Dixieland Band 50th Anniversary Concert
2007	"On a Slow Boat to China"	Benkó Dixieland Band 50th Anniversary Concert
2007	"One More Saints"	Benkó Dixieland Band 50th Anniversary Concert

=== Solo discography ===
Berki commenced releasing solo records in 1984. He released nine albums between 1984 and 2023.

==== Igazi Paradicsom (1984) ====
Year	Title	Album
1984	"Legyen Egy Dal"	Igazi Paradicsom (Real Paradise)
1984	"Nem"	Igazi Paradicsom (Real Paradise)
1984	"Szerenád"	Igazi Paradicsom (Real Paradise)
1984	"Kezet Fel!"	Igazi Paradicsom (Real Paradise)
1984	"Ószeres"	Igazi Paradicsom (Real Paradise)
1984	"Békés Expressz Blues"	Igazi Paradicsom (Real Paradise)
1984	"Szerelemlovag (Igazi Paradicsom)"	Igazi Paradicsom (Real Paradise)
1984	"Szép Kislány"	Igazi Paradicsom (Real Paradise)
1984	"No Nézd Csak, Mindenki"	Igazi Paradicsom (Real Paradise)
1984	"Tartozom"	Igazi Paradicsom (Real Paradise)

==== Hé, Mi a Bigyó? (1988) ====
Year	Title	Album
1988	"Hé, Mi A Bigyó?"	Hé, Mi a Bigyó?
1988	"Rumbassador"	Hé, Mi a Bigyó?

==== Jó Reggelt (1990) ====
Year	Title	Album
1990	"Jó Reggelt!"	Jó Reggelt
1990	"Hitetlen Tamás"	Jó Reggelt
1990	"Ez Van!"	Jó Reggelt
1990	"Utazás"	Jó Reggelt
1990	"Csütörtök Blues"	Jó Reggelt
1990	"Más"	Jó Reggelt
1990	"Álom (In Memoriam D. M.)"	Jó Reggelt
1990	"Harmadik Típusú Találkozások"	Jó Reggelt

==== A Mende-Sülysáp Blues - Best of Tamás Berki (1995) ====
Year	Title	Album
1995	"Legyen Egy Dal"	A Mende-Sülysáp Blues / Best of Tamás Berki (Best of Berki Tamás)
1995	"Nem"	A Mende-Sülysáp Blues / Best of Tamás Berki (Best of Berki Tamás)
1995	"Kezet Fel!"	A Mende-Sülysáp Blues / Best of Tamás Berki (Best of Berki Tamás)
1995	"Ószeres"	A Mende-Sülysáp Blues / Best of Tamás Berki (Best of Berki Tamás)
1995	"Békés Express Blues"	A Mende-Sülysáp Blues / Best of Tamás Berki (Best of Berki Tamás)
1995	"Szerelemlovag (Igazi Paradicsom)"	A Mende-Sülysáp Blues / Best of Tamás Berki (Best of Berki Tamás)
1995	"No Nézd Csak, Mindenki"	A Mende-Sülysáp Blues / Best of Tamás Berki (Best of Berki Tamás)
1995	"Tartozom"	A Mende-Sülysáp Blues / Best of Tamás Berki (Best of Berki Tamás)
1995	"Ez Van!"	A Mende-Sülysáp Blues / Best of Tamás Berki (Best of Berki Tamás)
1995	"Hitetlen Tamás"	A Mende-Sülysáp Blues / Best of Tamás Berki (Best of Berki Tamás)
1995	"Utazás"	A Mende-Sülysáp Blues / Best of Tamás Berki (Best of Berki Tamás)
1995	"Más"	A Mende-Sülysáp Blues / Best of Tamás Berki (Best of Berki Tamás)
1995	"Álom"	A Mende-Sülysáp Blues / Best of Tamás Berki (Best of Berki Tamás)
1995	"Harmadik Tipusú Találkozások"	A Mende-Sülysáp Blues / Best of Tamás Berki (Best of Berki Tamás)

==== Berki Sings Jazz with Shabu-Shabu (1996) ====
Year	Title	Album
1996	"Summertime"	Berki Sings Jazz
1996	"Take The "A" Train"	Berki Sings Jazz
1996	"Georgia On My Mind"	Berki Sings Jazz
1996	"Sugar"	Berki Sings Jazz
1996	"Autumn Leaves"	Berki Sings Jazz
1996	"All Of Me"	Berki Sings Jazz
1996	"Song For My Father"	Berki Sings Jazz
1996	"Don't Get Around Much Anymore"	Berki Sings Jazz
1996	"Work Song"	Berki Sings Jazz
1996	"Hard Times"	Berki Sings Jazz
1996	"Hallelujah I Love Her So"	Berki Sings Jazz
1996	"Let The Rain Fall On Me"	Berki Sings Jazz
1996	"The Last Blues"	Berki Sings Jazz

==== A Híd (2004) ====
Year	Title	Album
2004	"Tavasz"	A Híd
2004	"Kati"	A Híd
2004	"Rapjazz"	A Híd
2004	"Köszönöm Szépen"	A Híd
2004	"A Híd"	A Híd
2004	"Egy Csepp Méz"	A Híd
2004	"Az Élet"	A Híd
2004	"Te Kis Nyuszi"	A Híd
2004	"Agyamra Megyek"	A Híd
2004	"A Láz"	A Híd
2004	"Kerek A Világ"	A Híd
2004	"Várj"	A Híd
2004	"Minden Változó"	A Híd
2004	"Uram Adjál Jelet"	A Híd

==== Bika (2009) ====
Year	Title	Album
2009	"A Bika"	Bika Jam
2009	"Miről Írjak Kedves"	Bika Jam
2009	"Vasárnap Délután"	Bika Jam
2009	"A Majom"	Bika Jam
2009	"Gilgul"	Bika Jam
2009	"Új Tél, Új Nyár"	Bika Jam
2009	"Ez Volt A Vesztem"	Bika Jam
2009	"Fekete Blues"	Bika Jam
2009	"Perpetuum Mobile"	Bika Jam
2009	"Ha Fogod A Kezem"	Bika Jam
2009	"Hol Volt, Hol Nem Volt"	Bika Jam
2009	"Fohász"	Bika Jam
2009	"Ha Fogod A Kezem"	Bika Jam
2009	"Vasárnap Délután"	Bika Jam

==== Minden Délibáb (2014) ====
Year	Title	Album
2014	"Búcsú Blues"	Minden Délibáb
2014	"Én Az Egó"	Minden Délibáb
2014	"A Bika"	Minden Délibáb
2014	"My Funny Valentine"	Minden Délibáb
2014	"So Danco Samba"	Minden Délibáb
2014	"Minden Délibáb"	Minden Délibáb
2014	"Kötelező Blues"	Minden Délibáb
2014	"Várj"	Minden Délibáb
2014	"The Days Of Wine And Roses"	Minden Délibáb
2014	"Love For Sale"	Minden Délibáb
2014	"Legyen Egy Dal Ami Mindig A Végén Van"	Minden Délibáb

==== Hintaló (2023) ====
Year	Title	Album
2023	"Hol van az erdő"	Hintaló
2023	"Hintaló"	Hintaló
2023	"Szerelmes üzenet"	Hintaló
2023	"Berki Bárd"	Hintaló
2023	"Ez hát az élet"	Hintaló
2023	"A teszt"	Hintaló
2023	"Minden a tiéd"	Hintaló
2023	"Megjöttem Bébi"	Hintaló
2023	"Üzenet a netről"	Hintaló
2023	"Egy frászt!"	Hintaló
2023	"Love for Sale"	Hintaló

== Ancestry ==
Family Tree of Tamás Berki
Tamás Berki (16 May 1946, Budapest)	Father: Dezső Berki (18 June 1910, Budapest – 10 April 1994, Budapest) optician	Paternal grandfather: Salamon Berkovits (26 January 1875, Som – 19 August 1944, Budapest)	Paternal great-grandfather: Farkas Berkovits
Tamás Berki (16 May 1946, Budapest)	Father: Dezső Berki (18 June 1910, Budapest – 10 April 1994, Budapest) optician	Paternal grandfather: Salamon Berkovits (26 January 1875, Som – 19 August 1944, Budapest)	Paternal great-grandmother: Teréz Hauzmann
Tamás Berki (16 May 1946, Budapest)	Father: Dezső Berki (18 June 1910, Budapest – 10 April 1994, Budapest) optician	Paternal grandmother: Julianna Kaufer (31 August 1883, Diószeg – ?)	Paternal great-grandfather: József Kaufer (14 November 1856, Galánta)
Tamás Berki (16 May 1946, Budapest)	Father: Dezső Berki (18 June 1910, Budapest – 10 April 1994, Budapest) optician	Paternal grandmother: Julianna Kaufer (31 August 1883, Diószeg – ?)	Paternal great-grandmother: Katalin Müller (1860, Galánta – 23 July 1898, Budapest)
Tamás Berki (16 May 1946, Budapest)	Mother: Irén Tröster (17 February 1917, Budapest – 22 December 1994, Budapest)	Maternal grandfather: Elek Tröster (26 November 1881, Budapest – 2 November 1959, Budapest)	Maternal great-grandfather: Lipót Tröster (1842, Vörösvár – 14 August 1888, Budapest)
Tamás Berki (16 May 1946, Budapest)	Mother: Irén Tröster (17 February 1917, Budapest – 22 December 1994, Budapest)	Maternal grandfather: Elek Tröster (26 November 1881, Budapest – 2 November 1959, Budapest)	Maternal great-grandmother: Etelka Fischer
Tamás Berki (16 May 1946, Budapest)	Mother: Irén Tröster (17 February 1917, Budapest – 22 December 1994, Budapest)	Maternal grandmother: Kornélia Weinberger (12 September 1885, Budapest – 22 November 1953, Budapest)	Maternal great-grandfather: Bertalan Weinberger (1848, Óbuda – ?)
Tamás Berki (16 May 1946, Budapest)	Mother: Irén Tröster (17 February 1917, Budapest – 22 December 1994, Budapest)	Maternal grandmother: Kornélia Weinberger (12 September 1885, Budapest – 22 November 1953, Budapest)	Maternal great-grandmother: Zsófia Oszmann (1855, Kecskemét – ?)

== Honours and awards ==
- For Socialist Culture (1987)
- Inter-Lyra Award (2000)
- Gábor Szabó Award (2004)
- Artisjus Award (2006, 2021)
- Knight's Cross of the Hungarian Order of Merit (2007)
- Péter Máté Award (2018)
