= Illés (band) =

Hungarian band

Illés (Hungarian name: Illés együttes = Illés Ensemble) was a Hungarian rock/beat band (1960–1973), and was one of the biggest groups of the 1960s and early 1970s rock boom in Hungary. The band is often compared to the Beatles as regards the time period of its activity, its artistic and cultural influence and continuing popularity.

== Name ==
The band's name was originally taken from the family name of Lajos Illés, one of the members. Later however, the band chose as its logo a chariot in the form of musical notes, drawn by two horses, riding over the name "Illés" and the sun. This logo deliberately references the chariot of the prophet Elijah (Illés in Hungarian) in the Old Testament, in which he was said to have been taken to Heaven.

== Members ==
Levente Szörényi (b. 26 April 1945 Budapest) - lead guitars, lead vocals
János Bródy (b. 5 April 1946 Budapest) - rhythm guitars, recorder, flute, vocals
Szabolcs Szörényi (b. 16 September 1943 Budapest - 2 November 2024) - bass, vocals
Lajos Illés (b. 18 March 1942 Budapest - 29 January 2007) - vocals, strings, keys
Zoltán Pásztory (b. 3 October 1944 - 1 May 2005) (Later Örs Szörényi) - drums

== History ==
Illés was founded in 1960, but did not gain wider popularity outside of students clubs until 1963. This was the time the Hungarian language programs of Radio Luxemburg, broadcast illegally to Hungary, started to influence Hungarian youth culture. They were the first wildly popular band of the "new" beat music. Their song Még fáj minden csók (Every kiss still hurts) caused quite a scandal in 1966 because of Levente Szörényi's "squeaking" singing style.

Despite them being highly controversial, they were supported by the Communist regime - that was trying at the time to introduce a policy of "small liberties" for the people - and received numerous awards.

Nevertheless, they did not publish an album until 1967, with the film soundtrack for Ezek a fiatalok ("These young people!" or "These are the young people"). The movie was an attempt to make the general audience better acquainted with the (comparatively tame) youth culture of the time. Some of the most popular bands and singers of the time appear in the film, including Illés and Omega while the main female role is played by another famous Hungarian pop singer, Zsuzsa Koncz.

By the late 1960s, a great number of beat bands had emerged in Hungary. Fans of Illés and Omega soon started rivalries, parallelling the Beatles-Rolling Stones rivalry in the West.

== After Illés ==
The band broke up in 1973, possibly also due to political pressure. The Illés had been in fact barred for one year (plus a fine) from the Capital because of an interview they did release while staying in Britain and where they did criticize government. Nevertheless, the members, especially L. Szörényi and Bródy, continued to work together on other projects, notably with their new band Fonográf along with Sz. Szörényi, which tried to blend country elements with Hungarian folk music with hits like Lökd ide a sört! (Pass the beer!) and Mondd, hogy nem haragszol rám! (Say that you are not angry). They also continued their cooperation with singer Zsuzsa Koncz, for whom they had written songs since the first half of the 1960s.

The band later re-united for high-profile concerts on different occasions, the most memorable probably being their 1990 performance in the Népstadion after the regime change in Hungary. In 2001 they also performed a common concert with the other two dominant Hungarian bands of their era, Omega and Metró.

In 1983, Szörényi and Bródy wrote the rock opera István, a király, based on the life of Saint Stephen I, the first king of Hungary. It became an instant smash hit and retains a cult following to this day.

After the fall of Communism in 1990, Szörényi and Bródy grew apart politically. Bródy, a secular Jew, sympathized with the liberal Free Democrats, while Szörényi became increasingly nationalist and a religious Christian. This was reflected in his later rock operas like Atilla, Isten kardja (Atilla, the Sword of God - 1994) and Veled, Uram! (With You, My Lord! - 2000). The latter is a sequel to István, a király.

Drummer Zoltán Pásztory left Hungary in the 1970s and went to West Germany, where he sank into obscurity. He died in 2005 at the age of 60. For the already booked two concerts of the band in 2005 (one on the first day of the annual Sziget fesztivál in Budapest and the other in Miercurea Ciuc) his place at the drums was taken over by Örs Szörényi, the son of the band's lead guitarist Levente Szörényi.

After the original Illés formation broke up, founder and keyboardist Lajos Illés kept operating a band with the same name until the early 1980s. He later retired to the small village of Kisoroszi, where he acted as the chorister of the local Reformed church (his wife being the pastor there), and continued composing music including chorals, musicals and film soundtracks. He died in 2007 at the age of 64.

== Albums ==
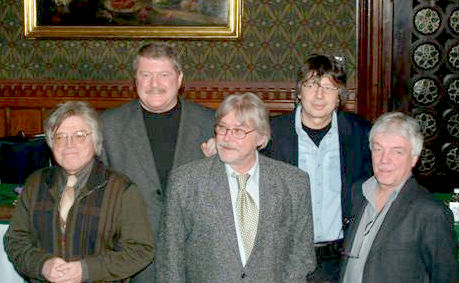
Zoltán Pásztory, János Bródy - Levente Szörényi, Lajos Illés, Szabolcs Szörényi.

Original albums:

- Ezek a fiatalok (1967 - film soundtrack)
- Nehéz az út (1969)
- Illések és pofonok (1969)
- Human Rights (1971)
- Add a kezed (1972)
- Ne sírjatok, lányok (1973)

Compilations:

- A koncert (1981 - live album)
- Illés kislemezek (1984 - singles)
- Népstadion 1990 (live album)
- Az Illés összes kislemeze (1990 - all singles)
- Az Illés másik oldalán - Válogatás (1996 - B sides compilation)
- Best of Illés - Balladák és lírák (1996)
- Best of Illés - Miért hagytuk, hogy így legyen (1996)
- Illés '96 (live album)

== Important songs (selection) ==
- Az utcán (On the street)
- Itt állok egymagamban (I'm standing here alone)
- Még fáj minden csók (Every kiss hurts)
- Igen (Yes)
- Nem érti más, csak én (Nobody understand, just me)
- Oh, mondd (Oh, tell me)
- Ne Gondold (Don't think)
- Amikor én még kissrác voltam (When I was still a little boy)
- Sárga rózsa (Yellow rose)
- Keresem a szót (I'm looking for words)
- Little Richard
- Igérd meg (Promise to me)
- Nem akarok (I don't want to)
- Miért hagytuk, hogy így legyen? (Why did we let it happen?)
- A szó veszélyes fegyver (The word is a dangerous weapon)
- Kislány, add a kezed (Girl, take my hand)
- Good bye London

== See also ==
- Hungarian pop
- Hungarian rock
