= Lucia Popp =

Slovak operatic soprano (1939–1993)

- Lucia Popp aged 26 as Blonde in Mozart's Die Entführung aus dem Serail
- Born: Lucia Poppová; 12 November 1939; Záhorská Ves, Slovak State
- Died: 16 November 1993 (aged 54); Munich, Germany
- Education: Academy of Performing Arts in Bratislava
- Occupation: Soprano singer
- Years active: 1962–1993
- Organisation(s): Vienna State Opera; Cologne Opera
- Title: Kammersängerin
- Spouses: György Fischer; Peter Jonas; Peter Seiffert (m. 1986)

Lucia Popp (born Lucia Poppová; 12 November 1939 – 16 November 1993) was a Slovak operatic soprano. She began her career as a soubrette, and later moved into the light-lyric and lyric coloratura soprano repertoire and then the lighter Richard Strauss and Wagner operas. Her career included performances at Vienna State Opera, the Metropolitan Opera, Covent Garden, and La Scala. Popp was also a highly regarded recitalist and lieder singer.

== Life and career ==
Lucia Poppová was born in Záhorská Ves in the Slovak State (later Czechoslovakia; present-day Slovakia). Her mother was a soprano, with whom the young Lucia often sang duets at home. Her father, an engineer, was at one time a cultural attaché to the British embassy.

She initially studied medicine at Comenius University, then entered the Academy of Performing Arts in Bratislava to study drama. Her vocal talent was discovered when she was cast as Nicole in Le Bourgeois gentilhomme, a role which required singing. While she began her vocal lessons during this period as a mezzo-soprano, her voice developed a high upper register to the degree that her professional debut at age 23 was as the Queen of the Night in Mozart's The Magic Flute in Bratislava, a role she revived in a 1963 recording conducted by Otto Klemperer. In 1963, Herbert von Karajan invited her to join the Vienna State Opera, where she debuted as Barbarina in Mozart's The Marriage of Figaro. Popp had strong ties to the Vienna State Opera throughout her career, and in 1979 was named an Austrian Kammersängerin. She made her Royal Opera House debut in 1966 as Oscar in Verdi's Un ballo in maschera, and her Metropolitan Opera debut in 1967 as the Queen of the Night (production designed by Marc Chagall).

As she reached her 30s in the 1970s, Popp turned from coloratura roles to lyric ones. By the 1980s when she was in her 40s and her voice matured further, she added more substantial roles such as Countess in Mozart's The Marriage of Figaro, the title role in Strauss's Arabella, Adina in L'elisir d'amore, and the Marschallin in Der Rosenkavalier. As a result of this vocal progression, Popp sang various roles in the same opera at different stages in her career, including Zdenka and Arabella in Richard Strauss's Arabella; Susanna and the Countess in Mozart's The Marriage of Figaro; Queen of the Night and Pamina in Mozart's The Magic Flute; Zerlina, Donna Elvira, and later Donna Anna in Mozart's Don Giovanni; Adele and Rosalinde in Johann Strauss II's Die Fledermaus; Ännchen and Agathe in Weber's Der Freischütz; and Sophie and the Marschallin in Richard Strauss's Der Rosenkavalier.

She played Tereza in the 1963 Slovak film Jánošík about the Slovak highwayman Juraj Jánošík. She played Anna Page in the "Merry Wives of Windsor" 1965 film, with music by Otto Nicolai.

== Personal life ==
Her first husband was Hungarian pianist and conductor György Fischer. In 1973, she began a long relationship with Peter Jonas, who was then artistic administrator of the Chicago Symphony Orchestra. They had married but divorced in the 1980s.

Popp died of brain cancer in 1993 in Munich, Germany, at the age of 54. She was buried in Cintorín Slávičie údolie, Bratislava. She was survived by her husband, German tenor Peter Seiffert, whom she had married in 1986. In March 2007, on BBC Music magazine's list of the "20 All-time Best Sopranos" based on a poll of 21 British music critics and BBC presenters, Popp placed seventh. On 12 June 2017, a bust of her by Juraj Čutek was unveiled in the Vienna State Opera.

== Recordings ==
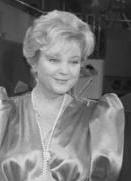
Popp, 1986

Popp rarely recorded roles she did not perform on stage (with a few exceptions, including Elisabeth in Wagner's Tannhäuser and the title role in Richard Strauss's Daphne). The following is a selection of her recordings:

- Mozart: The Marriage of Figaro (as Susanna), with Te Kanawa, von Stade, Allen, Ramey, Moll, and Solti (Decca)
- Mozart: The Marriage of Figaro (as Countess Almaviva), with van Dam, Hendricks, Raimondi, Baltsa, and Marriner (Philips)
- Mozart: Don Giovanni (as Zerlina), with Weikl, Bacquier, Sass, M. Price, Burrows, Solti (Decca)
- Mozart: The Magic Flute (as Queen of the Night), with Janowitz, Berry, Gedda, Frick, and Klemperer (EMI)
- Mozart: Così fan tutte (as Despina), New Philhamornia and Otto Klemperer, 1971 (EMI)
- Mozart: The Magic Flute (as Pamina), with Jerusalem, Brendel, Zednik, Gruberova and Haitink (EMI)
- Mozart: Idomeneo (as Ilia), with Pavarotti, Baltsa, Nucci, Gruberova, and Pritchard (Decca)
- Mozart: Die Entführung aus dem Serail (as Blonde), with Gedda, Rothenberger, Frick, Unger, and Krips (EMI)
- Mozart: La clemenza di Tito (as Vitellia for Harnoncourt, Teldec; and Servilia for Kertész (Decca) and Davis (Philips)
- Mozart: Il sogno di Scipione (as Costanza), with Gruberová, Schreier, Mathis and Hager (Decca)
- Orff: Carmina Burana with Unger, Wolansky, Noble, and Rafael Frühbeck de Burgos (EMI)
- R. Strauss: Intermezzo (as Christine), with Dallapozza, Fischer-Dieskau, Finke and Sawallisch (EMI)
- R. Strauss: Der Rosenkavalier (as Sophie), with Domingo, Ludwig, G. Jones, Berry and Bernstein (Sony)
- R. Strauss: Daphne (as Daphne), with Goldberg, Schreier, Wenkel, Moll and Haitink (EMI)
- R. Strauss: Four Last Songs, with Klaus Tennstedt conducting the London Philharmonic (EMI)
- J. Strauss II: Die Fledermaus (as Adele), with Várady, Weikl, Kollo, Prey and C. Kleiber (DG)
- J. Strauss II: Die Fledermaus (as Rosalinde), with Lind, Baltsa, Seiffert, Brendel, Rydl and Domingo (EMI)
- Beethoven: Fidelio (as Marzelline), with Janowitz, Kollo, Sotin, Fischer-Dieskau, Jungwirth and Bernstein (DG)
- Humperdinck: Hansel and Gretel (as Gretel), with Anny Schlemm, Brigitte Fassbaender, Gruberová, Hamari, Burrowes, Berry and Solti (Decca)
- Humperdinck: Hansel and Gretel (as the Dew Fairy), with Moffo, Donath, Ludwig, Fischer-Dieskau, Berthold, Auger and Eichhorn (RCA)
- Gluck: Orfeo ed Euridice (as Euridice), with Lipovsek, Kaufmann, and Hager (RCA)
- Verdi: Rigoletto (as Gilda), with Weikl, Aragall, and Gardelli (RCA)
- Leoncavallo: Pagliacci (as Nedda), with Atlantow, Weikl, and Münchner Rundfunkorchester conducted by Lamberto Gardelli (RCA)
- Leoncavallo: La bohème (as Mimi), with Bonisolli, Weikl, Titus, Miltcheva, and Wallberg (Orfeo)
- Puccini: Suor Angelica (as Angelica), with Lipovsek, Marga Schiml, and Patané (RCA)
- Puccini: La bohème (as Mimì), with Francisco Araiza, Barbara Daniels, Wolfgang Brendel, and Münchner Rundfunkorchester conducted by Stefan Soltesz (EMI) (sung in German)
- Donizetti: L'elisir d'amore (as Adina), with Dvorsky, Weikl, Nesterenko, and Wallberg (RCA)
- Donizetti: Don Pasquale (as Norina), with Araiza, Weikl, Nesterenko, and Wallberg (RCA)
- Flotow: Martha (title role), with Jerusalem, Soffel, Ridderbusch, Nimsgern, and Wallberg (RCA)
- Janáček: The Cunning Little Vixen (as the Vixen), with Randová, Jedlicka, Blachut and Mackerras (Decca)
- Janáček: Jenůfa (as Karolka), with Söderström, Dvorsky, Randova, Ochman, and Mackerras (Decca)
- Lehár: Der Graf von Luxemburg (as Angèle), with Gedda, Böhme, Holm, and Mattes (EMI).
- Wagner: Tannhäuser (as Elisabeth), with König, Moll, W. Meier, and Haitink (EMI).
- Bizet: Djamileh (as Djamileh), with Bonisolli, Lafont, Pineau, and Gardelli (Orfeo)

=== Videography ===
She can be seen in the role of Pamina in a performance of The Magic Flute, recorded live at the Bayerische Staatsoper in 1983, and published by Philips, catalogue number 070 505-3. Also, in Smetana's The Bartered Bride as Marie (the female lead). Recorded in 1982 in Vienna, published by Deutsche Grammophon Catalogue number 00440 073 4360, and in Die Fledermaus as Rosalinda (TDK). Also in Orff's Carmina Burana as the female lead in the Court of Love. Recorded in 1975, published by BMG Ariola catalogue number 74321 85285 9. She can also be seen as Marzelline in Beethoven's Fidelio with Gundula Janowitz conducted by Leonard Bernstein.

She was Sophie in Richard Strauss' Der Rosenkavalier DG 00440 073 4072 Carlos Kleiber conductor, Bayerisches Staatsorchester; Otto Schenk director, recorded 1979. There is a recording of Lucia Popp soloing in Strauss' Four Last Songs with Sir Georg Solti and the Chicago Symphony. In 1993 she was the soprano soloist in Antonín Dvořák's Requiem with the Prague Symphony Orchestra conducted by Petr Altrichter on Arthaus music DVD 102145. In 1985 a live recording from Tel Aviv of Gustav Mahler's Des Knaben Wunderhorn with the Israel PO, Leonard Bernstein and Walton Grönroos (baritone) was broadcast on the BBC and issued by DG on DVD as Unitel A05004635.
