= Ida Bieler =

American violinist

Ida Bieler (born 1950 in Roanoke, Virginia) is an American violinist and professor of Violin.

== Biography ==
Bieler studied under Ruggiero Ricci at the North Carolina School of the Arts, Oscar Shumsky at the Juilliard School of Music in New York, Max Rostal in Cologne and Nathan Milstein in London. From 1982 to 1988 she was concertmaster of the Gürzenich Orchestra of Cologne.

Bieler has been a member of the Melos Quartet. In 2001 she helped create the Xyrion Trio with Maria Kliegel and Nina Tichman and in 2003 the Heine Quartet. Since 1993 she has been Professor at the Robert Schumann University of Düsseldorf, where she leads the master class for violin. (As of 2015 she is no longer with the Xyrion Trio.)

Her husband was Hungarian pianist and conductor György Fischer.

In 2015 she became the artistic director of University of North Carolina School of the Arts' Chrysalis Chamber Music Institute.

== Honors, prizes and recordings ==
Ida Bieler has received numerous prizes and honors including the Echo Klassik Preis, the Cannes Classical Award, the Concert Artists Guild Award (New York), the Vittorio Gui prize for chamber music (Florence), and a Silver Medal in the International Violin Competition Dr. Luis Sigall in Viña del Mar, Chile.

She has recorded works by Anton Reicha, Paul Hindemith, Zdenek Fibich, Béla Bartók, Krzysztof Penderecki, and John Corigliano, among others, and for labels such as Musikproduktion Dabringhaus und Grimm and Naxos Records.
