= Aladár Pege =

Hungarian jazz musician (1939–2006)

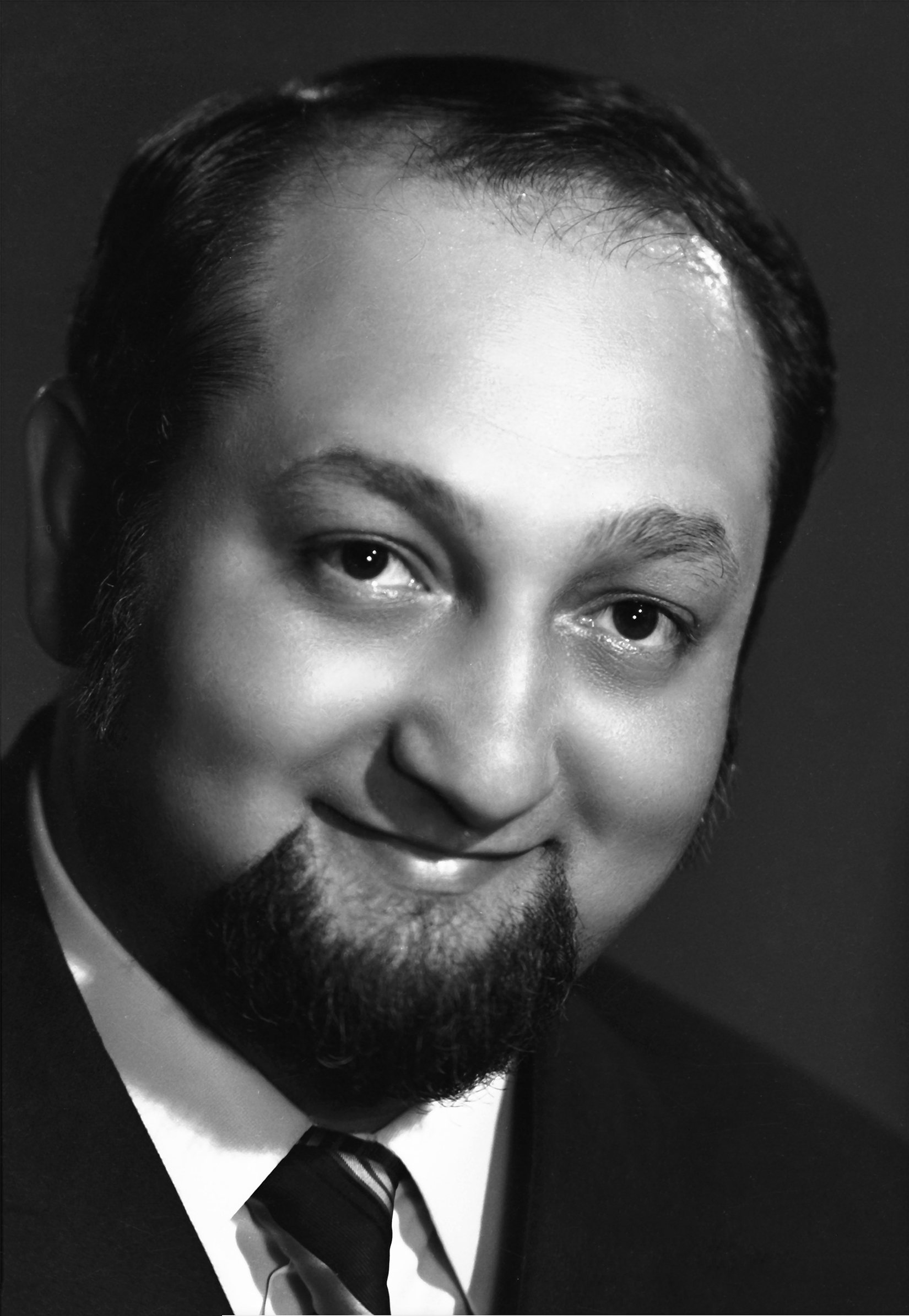

Background information
- Born: 8 October 1939
- Died: 23 September 2006 (aged 66)
- Genre: Jazz
- Instrument: Double bass

Aladár Pege (8 October 1939 – 23 September 2006) was a jazz musician from Hungary. He was well known for his work and was dubbed "the Paganini of double bass".

He was chosen as best soloist of Europe in 1970, performed at Carnegie Hall and worked with Herbie Hancock. This was quite rare during the communist era, when Hungarian (and other Eastern bloc countries') artists were seriously restricted in foreign travel. He spent his last decades teaching at the Franz Liszt Academy of Music in Budapest.
