= 52nd Locarno Film Festival =

Film festival in Locarno, Switzerland

- Opening film: East/West directed by Régis Wargnier
- Closing film: The Legend of 1900 directed by Giuseppe Tornatore
- Location: Locarno, Switzerland
- Founded: 1946
- Awards: Golden Leopard: Skin of Man, Heart of Beast directed by Hélène Angel
- Artistic director: Marco Mueller
- Festival date: Opening: 4 August 1999; Closing: 14 August 1999
- Website: LFF

Locarno Film Festival
- 53rd 51st

The 52nd Locarno Film Festival was held from 4 to 14 August 1999 in Locarno, Switzerland. The opening film of the festival was East/West directed by Régis Wargnier. The closing film was the world premiere of the Giuseppe Tornatore's re-cut and trimmed down The Legend of 1900. A special section was dedicated to "Joe Dante and the 2nd Corman Generation". Most of the featured directors were on-hand and participated in Q&As throughout the festival. Roger Corman, himself, was pleasantly surprised at a diner in his honor saying, "Who'd ever imagine we'd all be admired like this" and that he'd "have to do a better job of preserving" the company film library.

The Leopard of Honor was awarded to three directors: Swiss director Daniel Schmid, Italian director Francesco Rosi, and French filmmaker Gerard Blain. Each director had a film at the festival. The Piazza Grande section featured Schmid's The Last Days of Switzerland and Rosi's 1961 restored mafia film Salvatore Giuliano. While, Blain's new film So be it (Ainsi soit-il) was screened out-of-competition. Unfortunately for the festival, rain caused many screening on the Piazza Grande, the 7,000-seat open-air theater, to be moved inside.

The festival also featured Asia Argento's directorial debt with Your Tongue on my Heart, a 4 minute short film and the gay feature-length comedy, shot without the approval of the Chinese government, Men and Women directed by Liu Bingjian. The audience award went to Himalaya by director Eric Valli.

French director Patrice Chereau resigned from the jury to promote his newest film. The anticipated film Soft Fruit directed by Christina Andreef was pulled from the festival at the last minute due to a legal issues with the distributor Fox, who was unhappy with the credit sequence and stopped the production of all prints.

This was long-time festival president Raimondo Rezzonico's last year at the festival, following the public disagreement with festival director Marco Mueller the year before.

The Golden Leopard, the festival's top prize, was awarded to Peau D’homme, Coeur De Bête (Skin of Man, Heart of Beast) directed by Hélène Angel, which was her first feature film.

== Official Jury ==
=== Official International Jury ===
- Paul Bartel, American actor and director, Jury head
- Jakob Claussen, German producer
- Jean-Michel Frodon, French Film critic
- Amitav Ghosh, Indian novelist
- Lu Yue, Chinese cinematographer and director
- Kati Outinen, Finnish actress
- Giuseppe Piccioni, Italian director
- Beki Probst, the director of the Berlin Film Market

=== Resigned ===
- Patrice Chereau, Resigned from Jury, French filmmaker

== Official Sections ==
The following films were screened in these sections:

=== Piazza Grande ===
The Piazza Grande is the 7,000 seat open-air theater assembled in the town square each year.

English Title	Original Title	Director(s)	Year	Production Country
Beresina, or the Last Days of Switzerland	Beresina Oder Die Letzten Tage Der Schweiz	Daniel Schmid	1999	Switzerland, Germany
Bowfinger		Frank Oz	1999	USA
East/West	Est-Ouest	Régis Wargnier	1999	France
Crazy English	Fengkuang Yingyu	Yuan Zhang	1999	China
Himalaya	Himalaya, L'Enfance D'Un Chef	Éric Valli	1999	France
Kikujiro	Kikujiro No Natsu	Takeshi Kitano	1999	Japan
The Legend of 1900	La Leggenda Del Pianista Sull'Oceano	Giuseppe Tornatore	1999	Italia, USA
The Little Thief	Le Petit Voleur	Erick Zonca	1999	France
Pushing Tin		Mike Newell	1999	USA
Salvatore Giuliano		Francesco Rosi	1962	Italia
The Birds		Alfred Hitchcock	1963	USA

=== International Competition ===
International Competition

English Title	Original Title	Director(s)	Year	Production Country
1999 Madeleine		Laurent Bouhnik	1999	France
So Be It	Ainsi Soit-Il	Gérard Blain	1999	France
Kisses and Hugs	Baci E Abbracci	Paolo Virzì	1999	Italia
Barak		Valerij Ogorodnikov	1999	Russia
The Pig's Retribution	Buta No Mukui	Sai Yohichi	1999	Japan
The Einstein of Sex	Der Einstein Des Sex: Leben Und Werk Des Dr. Magnus Hirschfeld	Rosa von Praunheim	1999	Germany
Two Streams	Dois Córregos	Carlos Reichenbach	1999	Brazil
The City	El Medina	Yousry Nasrallah	1999	Egypt, France
The Miracle of P. Tinto	El Milagro De P. Tinto	Javier Fesser	1998	Spain
Fallen Angels Paradise	Gannat Al Shayateen	Oussama Fawzi	1999	Egypt
Moonlight Whispers	Gekkô No Sasayaki	Akihiko Shiota	1999	Japan
Big Feelings	Grosse Gefühle	Christof Schertenleib	1999	Switzerland, Luxembourg
The Time of Love	Il Tempo Dell Amore	Giacomo Campiotti	1999	Italia, Great Britain
Life Doesn’t Scare Me	La Vie Ne Me Fait Pas Peur	Noémie Lvovsky	1999	France, Switzerland
Men and Women	Nannan Nünü	Liu Bingjian	1999	China
Skin of Man, Heart of Beast	Peau D'Homme, Coeur De Bête	Hélène Angel	1999	France
Before Sunset	Prima Del Tramonto	Stefano Incerti	1999	Italia
Simon, the Magician	Simon Mágus	Ildikó Enyedi	1999	Hungary, France
The Dream Catcher		Ed Radtke	1999	USA
The Uprising	Yi Jae-Su Eï Nan	Park Kwang-su	1999	South Korea, France
The Third Page	Üçüncü Sayfa	Zeki Demirkubuz	1999	Türkiye

=== Filmmakers of the Present ===
Filmmakers of the Present - Out of Competition

Original Title	English Title	Director(s)	Year	Production Country
Amber City		Jem Cohen	1999	Italia, USA
Au Champ D'Honneur	Field of Honor	Luc Moullet	1998	France
Belfast, Maine		Frederick Wiseman	1999	USA
Chronique Vigneronne	Chronicle Winegrower	Jacqueline Veuve	1999	Switzerland
Condo Painting		John McNaughton	1999	USA
David Cronenberg, I Have To Make The Word Be Flesh		André S. Labarthe	1999	France
Delta Padano		Florestano Vancini	1951	Italia
Dokomademo Ikou	Migration Everywhere		1999	Japan
Due Come Noi, Non Dei Migliori	Two Like Us, not the Best	Stefano Grossi		Italia
Escalator Over The Hill		Steve Gebhardt	1999	USA
I Paisán - Parte Prima	I Parentsán - PART	Giuseppe Morandi		Italia
I Paisán - Parte Seconda	The Paisáns - Friends	Giuseppe Morandi		Italia
Jacques Doillon - Les Mots, L'Émotion...	Jacques Doillon - Words, Emotion ...	Anne Brochet, Françoise Dumas	1998	France
Jam Session - Kikujiro No Natsu Koshiki Kaizokuban	Im the Sound of the Touch - The Summer of the Giro Listening To, Pirated Version	Makoto Shinozaki	1999	Japan
Just In Time		Lou Castel	1998	France
Kadi Jolie	Hard	Idrissa Ouédraogo	1999	France, Burkina Faso
Kto Bolche	How Much to Say	Vitali Kanevski	1999	France, Belgium
La Salamandre	The Salamander	Alain Tanner	1971	Switzerland
Le Dernier Plan	The Last Plan	Benoît Peeters	1999	Belgium
Le Plat De Sardines	The Sardine Dish	Omar Amiralay	1998	France
Les Étrangers	Foreigners	Philippe Faucon	1999	France
Lopen	To Walk	Mijke de Jong	1999	Netherlands
Noi E Il Duca - Quando Duke Ellington Suonò A Palermo	We and the Duke - When Duke Ellington Played in Palermo	Daniele Ciprì, Franco Maresco	1999	Italia
Paris Mon Petit Corps Est Bien Las De Ce Grand Monde	Paris My Little Body is Tired of this Great World	Franssou Prenant	1999	France
Philippe Garrel		Françoise Etchegaray	1998	France
Qui Sait?	Who Knows?	Nicolas Philibert	1998	France
Rom Tour		Giorgio Garini, Silvio Soldini	1999	Switzerland, Italia
Santitos		Alejandro Springall	1998	Mexico
Stairway To Heaven		Errol Morris	1988	USA
Takeshi Kitano L'Imprévisible	Takeshi Kitano the Unpredictable	Jean-Pierre Limosin	1999	France
The City Below The Line		Milton Moses Ginsberg	1999	USA
Tippi Hedrens Screen Test		Alfred Hitchcock	1962	USA
Too Pure		Sunmin Park	1999	Korea, USA

=== Leopards of Tomorrow ===
Leopards of Tomorrow (Pardi di Domani)

Leopards of Tomorrow - Special Program
Original Title	English Title	Director(s)	Year	Production Country
Bonne Journée, Monsieur M.	Good Day, Mr. M.	Samuel Guillaume, Frédéric Guillaume	1999	Switzerland
La Tua Lingua Sul Mio Cuore	Your Tongue on My Heart	Asia Argento	1999	Italia
Portugal
A Testemunha	The Witness	Fátima Ribeiro	1998	Portugal
Dois Dragões	Two Dragons	Margarida Cardoso	1996	Portugal
Estou Perto	I'm Close	Sandro Aguilar	1998	Portugal
História Sem Interesse	History without Interest	Wilson Siqueira	1998	Portugal
Jam Session		Marina Simóes	1998	USA
Menos Nove	Minus Nine	Rita Nunes		Portugal
O Prego	The Nail	João Maia	1999	Portugal
O Que Foi?	What it Was?	Ivo M. Ferreira	1999	Portugal
O Ralo	Or Laugh	Tiago Guedes, Frederico Serra	1999	Portugal
Porque É Que Eu Não Disse Nada	Why I Didn't Say Anything	Miguel Seabra Lopes	1999	Portugal
Primavera		João Tuna	1999	Portugal
Senhor Jerónimo		Inês De Medeiros	1998	Portugal
Uma Voz Na Noite	A VOICE in the NIGHT	Solveig Nordlund	1998	Portugal
É Só Um Minuto	It's Just a Minute	Pedro Caldas	1998	Portugal
Portugal - Special Programs
A Caça	Hunting	Manoel de Oliveira	1963	Portugal
A Pousada Das Chagas	The Pousada Das Chagas	Paulo Rocha	1971	Portugal
Douro, Faina Fluvial	Doro, Float Fluvial	Manoel de Oliveira	1931	Portugal
Golpe De Asa	Handle	António Borges Correia	1998	Portugal
Jaime		António Reis	1974	
O Senhor	The Lord	Antonio Campos	1959	Portugal
Quem Espera Por Sapatos De Defunto Morre Descalço	Who Waits for Deceased Shoes Dies Barefoot	João César Monteiro	1970	
Um Tesoiro	A Tatter	Antonio Campos	1958	Portugal
Swiss Confederation
12 X 12		Maja Zimmermann	1999	USA
Adrian Und Der Wolf	Adrian and the Wolf	Sylvie Lazzarini	1999	Germany
Babami Hirsizlar Caldi	Babami Hireless Caldied	Esen Isik	1998	Switzerland
Blush		Barbara Kulcsar	1999	Switzerland
Darf Ich Mal Schreien	May I Scream	Jeanne Berthoud	1998	Switzerland
Douche Froide	Cold Shower	Julien Sulser	1999	Switzerland
Drei Wünsche	Three Wishes	Rudolph Jula	1999	Germany, Switzerland
Einladung Auf Dem Lande	Invitation in the Country	Thomas Hess	1999	Switzerland
Elysium		Tobias Weber	1999	Switzerland
Gömmer	Hiding	Zita Bernet	1999	Switzerland
L'Appel De La Cave	Call of the Cellar	Mathieu Mercier	1999	Switzerland
Les Électrons Libres	Free Electrons	Frédéric Mermoud	1999	Switzerland
Lettre À Mon Père	Letter to My Father	Karine Odorici	1999	Switzerland
Lilien	Lilies	Oliver Rihs	1999	Switzerland
Not Registered		Nello Correale	1999	Switzerland
Razor'S Edge		Lorenzo Benedick	1999	USA
Sinécure	Sinecure	Patrick Dieth, François Limoge	1999	Switzerland
Sinécure	Sinecure	Patrick Dieth, François Limoge	1999	Switzerland
Suite Nuptiale	Nuptial Suite	François Cesalli	1999	Switzerland
The Cookie Thief		Korinna Sehringer	1999	Switzerland
Trivial Killer		Isabelle Vossart	1999	Switzerland

=== Joe Dante and the 2nd Generation Corman Directors ===
This section featured works from Roger Corman and the directors he worked with and brought up including Joe Dante. It included films, shorts, television episodes and commercials.

Class 1970 - Joe Dante And the Second Generation Corman
English Title	Original Title	Director(s)	Year	Production Country
A Bucket of Blood		Roger Corman	1959	USA
A Star Is Hatched		Friz Freleng	1938	USA
Amazing Stories - Boo!		Joe Dante	1986	USA
Amazing Stories - The Greibble		Joe Dante	1986	USA
Amazing Stories - The Secret Cinema		Paul Bartel	1986	USA
Amazon Women On The Moon - Ventriloquist Episode		Joe Dante	1986	USA
Amazon Women On The Moon		Joe Dante, Carl Gottlieb, Peter Horton, John Landis, Robert K. Weiss	1986	USA
Backdraft		Ron Howard	1991	USA
Caged Heat		Jonathan Demme	1974	USA
Cannonball		Paul Bartel	1976	USA
Citizens Band		Jonathan Demme	1977	USA
City of Hope		John Sayles	1990	USA
Coal Black and de Sebben Dwarfs		Bob Clampett	1943	USA
Cockfighter		Monte Hellman	1974	USA
Death Race 2000		Paul Bartel	1975	USA
Eating Raoul		Paul Bartel	1982	USA
Eerie, Indiana - Foreverware		Joe Dante	1991	USA
Eerie, Indiana - Heart On A Chain		Joe Dante	1991	USA
Eerie, Indiana - Reality Takes A Holiday		Ken Kwapis	1991	USA
Eerie, Indiana - The Hole In The Head Gang		Joe Dante	1992	USA
Eerie, Indiana - The Losers		Joe Dante	1991	USA
Eerie, Indiana - The Retainer		Joe Dante	1991	USA
Elvis Meets Nixon		Allan Arkush	1997	USA
Explorers		Joe Dante	1985	USA
Falling Hare		Bob Clampett	1943	USA
Fighting Mad		Jonathan Demme	1976	USA
Frank Film		Caroline and Frank Mouris	1973	USA
Fresh Airdale		Chuck Jones	1945	USA
Get Crazy		Allan Arkush	1983	USA
Gremlins - Directors Cut		Joe Dante	1983	USA
Gremlins 2: The New Batch		Joe Dante	1989	USA
Happy-Go-Nutty		Tex Avery	1944	USA
Hellzapoppin'		H. C. Potter	1941	USA
Hollywood Boulevard		Allan Arkush, Joe Dante	1976	USA
House on Haunted Hill		William Castle	1958	USA
I Walked with a Zombie		Jacques Tourneur	1943	USA
Innerspace		Joe Dante	1986	USA
It! The Terror From Beyond Space		Edward L. Cahn	1958	USA
King-Size Canary		Tex Avery	1947	USA
Picture Windows - Lightning		Joe Dante	1995	USA
Last Embrace		Jonathan Demme	1979	USA
Little Buck Cheeser		Rudolf Ising	1937	USA
Little Red Walking Hood		Tex Avery	1937	USA
Lone Star		John Sayles	1996	USA
M&M - Mars Commercials		Joe Dante		USA
Mant! Featurette		Joe Dante		USA
Matinee		Joe Dante	1993	USA
Melvin and Howard		Jonathan Demme	1980	USA
Men with Guns		John Sayles	1997	USA
Night Shift		Ron Howard	1982	USA
Over the Edge		Jonathan Kaplan	1979	USA
Piranha		Joe Dante	1978	USA
Planet of the Vampires	Terrore Nello Spazio / Planet Of Blood	Mario Bava	1965	USA
Police Squad! - Ring Of Fear		Joe Dante	1982	USA
Police Squad! - Testimony Of Evil		Joe Dante	1982	USA
Private Parts		Paul Bartel	1972	USA
Puss n' Booty		Frank Tashlin	1943	USA
Ransom		Ron Howard	1996	USA
Reckless Youth		Joe Dante		USA
Rock 'N' Roll High School		Allan Arkush	1979	USA
Roger Corman: Hollywood's Wild Angel		Christian Blackwood	1977	USA
Runaway Daughters		Joe Dante	1993	USA
Scenes from the Class Struggle in Beverly Hills		Paul Bartel	1989	USA
Small Soldiers		Joe Dante	1998	USA
Stanley Stanley		Jonathan Kaplan		USA
Starship Troopers		Paul Verhoeven	1997	USA
Suburbia		Penelope Spheeris	1983	USA
Targets		Peter Bogdanovich	1967	USA
Tell-Tale Heart		Ted Parmelee	1953	USA
The 'Burbs - Director's Cut		Joe Dante		USA
The 'Burbs		Joe Dante	1988	USA
The Big Snooze		Bob Clampett	1946	USA
The Case of the Stuttering Pig		Frank Tashlin	1937	USA
The Howling		Joe Dante	1980	USA
The Howling - Porn Short		Joe Dante		USA
The Incredible Shrinking Man		Jack Arnold	1957	USA
The Intruder		Roger Corman	1962	USA
The Little Shop of Horrors		Roger Corman	1961	USA
The Masque of the Red Death		Roger Corman	1964	USA, Great Britain
The Movie Orgy		Joe Dante, Jon Davison		USA
The Old Grey Hare		Bob Clampett	1944	USA
The Osiris Chronicle -The Warlord: Battle For The Galaxy		Joe Dante	1995	USA
The Power Of Thought		Eddie Donnelly	1948	USA
The Second Civil War		Joe Dante	1996	USA
The Secret Cinema		Paul Bartel	1969	USA
The Student Nurses		Stephanie Rothman	1970	USA
The Student Teachers		Jonathan Kaplan	1973	USA
The Temptations		Allan Arkush	1998	USA
The Terror		Roger Corman	1963	USA
This Island Earth		Joseph M. Newman	1954	USA
Truck Turner		Jonathan Kaplan	1974	USA
Twilight Zone - A World Of Difference		Ted Post	1960	USA
Twilight Zone - It's A Good Life		James Sheldon	1961	USA
Twilight Zone - The Shadow Man		Joe Dante	1985	USA
Twilight Zone: Tower Of Terror Disney Ride		Joe Dante		
Twilight Zone: The Movie		Joe Dante, George Miller, Steven Spielberg, John Landis	1982	USA
Twilight Zone: The Movie - Episode 3 - It's A Good Life		Joe Dante	1982	USA
What's Up Joe Dante?		Grant Littlechild	1991	Great Britain
White Dog		Samuel Fuller	1982	USA

=== Special Sidebar ===
Original Title	English Title	Director(s)	Year	Production Country
Elvis Meets Nixon		Allan Arkush	1997	USA
Inediti Danteschi	Unpublished Dante			

== Independent Sections ==
=== Critics Week ===
The Semaine de la Critique is an independent section, created in 1990 by the Swiss Association of Film Journalists in partnership with the Locarno Film Festival.

Original Title	English Title	Director(s)	Year	Production Country
Aber Auch Ich!	But Me Too!	Urs Wäckerli	1999	Switzerland
Desperately Seeking Helen		Eisha Marjara	1998	Canada
En Släkting Till Älvorna	A Relative of the Elves	Kirsi Nevanti	1998	Sweden
Genet À Chatila	Genet in Chatila	Richard Dindo	1999	Switzerland, France
Punitive Damage		Annie Goldson	1999	New Zealand
The Hillbrow Kids		Jacqueline Görgen, Michael Hammon	1999	Germany

=== Swiss Perspectives ===
Swiss Perspectives
Original Title	English Title	Director(s)	Year	Production Country
An Heiligen Wassern	Sacred Water	Erich Waschneck	1932	Germany, Switzerland
Attention Aux Chiens	Watch Out for Dogs	François Christophe Marzal	1999	Switzerland
Closed Country		Kaspar Kasics	1999	Switzerland
General Sutter		Benny Fasnacht	1999	USA, Switzerland
Id Swiss			1999	Switzerland
La Bonne Conduite (Cinq Histoires D'Auto-École)	Good Driving (Five Driving School Stories)	Jean-Stéphane Bron	1999	Switzerland
La Mort De Ludovic	To the Dead by Ludovic	Pascal Gavillet	1998	Switzerland
La Reine Du Coq-À-L Âne	The Cock Queen Donkey Donkey	Jeanne Waltz	1999	Switzerland
Made In India		Patricia Plattner	1998	Switzerland
Pas De Café, Pas De Télé, Pas De Sexe	No Coffee, No TV, No Sex	Romed Wyder	1999	Switzerland

== Official Awards ==
=== Official Jury ===
- Golden Leopard: Peau D’homme, Coeur De Bête (Skin of Man, Heart of Beast) directed by Hélène Angel
- Silver Leopard, Nouveau Cinéma: Barak directed by Valerij Ogorodnikov
- Silver Leopard, Jeune Cinéma: La Vie Ne Me Fait Pas Peur directed by Noémie Lvovsky
- Bronze Leopard (Acting): Vera Briole in Madeleine directed by Laurent Bouhnik, Serge Riaboukine in Peau D’homme, Coeur De Bête (Skin of Man, Heart of Beast) directed by Hélène Angel
- Special Jury Prize: El Medina directed by Yousry Nasraliah
- Special Mention, Official Jury: El Milagro De P. Tinto directed by Javier Fesser

=== FIPRESCI JURY ===
- FIPRESCI JURY PRIZE: Men and Women directed by Liu Bingjian (China)

=== Critics Jury ===
- CRITICS WEEK PRIZE: Desperately Seeking Helen directed by Eisha Mar Jara (Canada)
