= 50th Locarno Film Festival =

Film festival in Locarno, Switzerland

- Opening film: Men In Black directed by Barry Sonnenfeld
- Closing film: Last Tango in Paris directed by Bernardo Bertolucci
- Location: Locarno, Switzerland
- Founded: 1946
- Awards: Golden Leopard: The Mirror directed by Jafar Panahi
- Artistic director: Marco Mueller
- Festival date: Opening: 6 August 1997; Closing: 16 August 1997
- Website: LFF

Locarno Film Festival
- 51st 49th

The 50th Locarno Film Festival was held from 6 to 16 August 1997 in Locarno, Switzerland. The opening film of the festival was the international premiere of Men In Black. The closing film of the festival was Last Tango in Paris in honor of its director Bernardo Bertolucci who was awarded the Leopard of Honor for his career in cinema at the festival this year.

The Piazza Grande, the open-air theater, saw the international premiere of Face/Off directed by John Woo with a record crowd of 10,000 people. Another audience hit was the British stripper comedy The Full Monty, which drew a large crowd and won the Audience Award.

In honor of the 50th Anniversary, the festival held a retrospective called "50 (+1) Years of American Cinema", which featured films from the first year of the festival, 1946, to the present 1997. The section was selected by 30 American directors tasked with choosing "underrated" films. Some directors who selected films include Robert Altman, Martin Scorsese, and Kathryn Bigelow, who was in town for the festival.

The festival also managed to feature the first version of Palme d'Or winner Taste of Cherry which was shot on video in 1994 with director Abbas Kirostami as the lead, before he made the final 1997 version. Plus, the world premiere of experimental filmmaker Jonas Mekas's entire Diaries series, which utilized 60 hours of footage shot over 50 years.

Due to the rule changes last year, over half the films in competition were from established directors, and not first or second feature films as was traditionally the case at Locarno. The new Venice Film Festival chief, Felice Laudadio, and Locarno Festival chief Marco Mueller normalized relations after a 1995 fight between the festivals and helped each other acquire films, with Mueller helping Venice get Zhang Yimou's Keep Cool.

The Golden Leopard, the festival's top prize, was awarded to The Mirror directed by Jafar Panahi.

== Official Jury ==
- Marco Bellocchio, Italian director, Jury Head
- Maria de Medeiros, Portuguese actress
- Claire Denis, French director
- Fernando Solanas, Argentinean director
- Nan Goldin, American photographer
- Geraldine Chaplin, British actress
- Richard Dindo, German director
- Katrin Cartlidge, British Actress
- David Strieff, former Locarno Festival chief and artistic director
- Zhang Yimou, Chinese director
- Manfred Eicher, German music producer
- Freddy Buache, Swiss Cinematheque head, and film historian

== Official Sections ==
The following films were screened in these sections:

=== Piazza Grande ===
The following films were screened on the Piazza Grande:

English Title	Original Title	Director(s)	Year	Production Country
Destiny	Al Massir	Youssef Chahine	1997	France, Egypt
Career Girls		Mike Leigh	1996	Great Britain
Known to Our Departments	Connu De Nos Services	Jean-Stéphane Bron	1997	Switzerland
Conspiracy Theory		Richard Donner	1997	USA
Face/Off		John Woo	1997	USA
The Prince of Homburg	Il Principe Di Homburg Di Heinrich Von Kleist	Marco Bellocchio	1997	Italia
The Joly-Normandin Fund	Le Fonds Joly-Normandin	F.J. Ossang	1896	Switzerland
Men in Black		Barry Sonnenfeld	1997	USA
The Full Monty		Peter Cattaneo	1996	USA
The Ice Storm		Ang Lee	1997	USA
The Sweet Hereafter		Atom Egoyan	1997	Canada
Last Tango in Paris	Ultimo Tango A Parigi	Bernardo Bertolucci	1972	Italia, France
The Eel	Unagi	Shōhei Imamura	1997	Japan

=== International Competition ===
Highlighted title indicates Golden Leopard winner:

English Title	Original Title	Director(s)	Year	Production Country
The Mirror	Ayneh	Jafar Panahi	1997	Iran
Broos		Mijke de Jong	1997	Netherlands
Clandestins		Denis Chouinard, Nicolas Wadimoff	1997	Switzerland, Canada
Doctor Chance	Docteur Chance	F.J. Ossang	1997	France, Chile
Metropolitan Fairy Tales	Fiabe Metropolitane	Egidio Eronico	1997	Italia
The Crazy Stranger	Gadjo Dilo	Tony Gatlif	1997	France
The Ark of the Desert	L'Arche Du Desert	Mohamed Chouikh	1997	Algérie, France
The Third Moon	La Terza Luna	Matteo Bellinelli	1997	Switzerland, Italia
The Acrobats	Le Acrobate	Silvio Soldini	1997	Italia, Switzerland
The Infidels	Les Infidèles	Randa Chahal Sabag	1997	France
Martha's Garden	Marthas Garten	Peter Liechti	1997	Switzerland, Germany
The Bachelor	O Ergenis	Nikos Panayotopoulos	1997	Greece
Office Killer		Cindy Sherman	1997	USA
The Bible And Gun Club		Daniel J. Harris	1997	USA
Topless Women Talk About Their Lives		Harry Sinclair	1997	New Zealand
Transatlantic	Transatlantique	Christine Laurent	1997	France
We All Fall Down	Tutti Giù Per Terra	Davide Ferrario	1996	Italia
Winter Sleepers	Winterschläfer	Tom Tykwer	1997	Germany, France
Made in Hong Kong	Xianggang Zhizao	Fruit Chan	1997	Hong Kong
Journey to the Western Xia Empire	Xixia Lu Tiaotiao	Lu Wei	1997	China

=== Filmmakers of the Present ===
The following films were screened in the Filmmakers of the Present Competition is also known as the Concorso Cineasti del Presente.

Filmmakers of the Present - Out of Competition

Original Title	English Title	Director(s)	Year	Production Country
A Flor Encarnada	To Incarnate Flower	Marcel Hanoun	1994	France
Ardekoul		Jafar Panahi	1997	Iran
Award Presentation To Andy Warhol		Jonas Mekas	1994	USA
Birth Of A Nation		Jonas Mekas	1996	USA
Bruggen	Bridging	Dick Rijneke	1996	Netherlands
Bruit D'Amour Et De Guerre	Noise of Love and War	Marcel Hanoun	1997	France
Cela S'Appelle L'Amour	It's Called Love	Marcel Hanoun	1984	France
Char Adhyay	Four Chapters	Kumar Shahani	1997	India
Chère Catherine	Dear Catherine	Raoul Peck	1997	Haiti
Cosa Centra Con L'Amore	What Does it Have to Do with Love	Marco Speroni	1997	Italia
D'Ici Là	By then	Jean-Charles Fitoussi	1997	France
Die Kinder Von Furna	The Children of Furna	Christian Schocher	1975	Switzerland
En Une Poignee De Mains Amies, Fleuve Qui, Par Dessous Les Ponts, Ouvre La Porte De La Mer	In a Handful of Friendly Hands, River Which, Below the Bridges, Opens the Door of the Sea	Jean Rouch	1997	France
Familles Je Vous Hais	Families I Hate you	Bruno Bontzolakis	1997	France
Fantômes De Tanger	Ghosts of Tangier	Edgardo Cozarisnky	1997	France, Germany
Fast, Cheap & Out Of Control		Errol Morris	1997	USA
Georges Bataille - À Perte De Vue	Georges Bataille - As Far as the Eye can See	André S. Labarthe	1997	France
Happy Birthday To John Lennon		Jonas Mekas	1996	USA
He Stands In The Desert Counting The Seconds Of His Life		Jonas Mekas	1975	USA
Hello- Les Larmes De L'Amitie	Hello- Friendly Tears	Michel Sumpf	1997	France
Hispaniola Ritratto Di Claudiio Bonifacio, Naufrologo	Hispaniola Portrait by Claudiio Bonifacio, a Naughter	Antonietta De Lillo	1997	Italia
Il Etait Une Fois Donyazad	He Was Once Donyazad	Merzak Allouache	1996	France
Il Manocchio	The Manocchio	Davide Ciprì, Franco Maresco	1996	Italia
Jahre Später	Years Later	Christian Schocher	1997	Switzerland
Je Meurs De Vivre	I Die of Living	Marcel Hanoun	1994	France
L'Appartamento	The Apartment	Francesca Pirani	1997	Italia
La Boulangère Et Le Cosmonaute	The Baker and the Cosmonaut	Marcel Hanoun	1997	France
La Vallee Close		Jean-Claude Rousseau	1995	France
La Via Del Petrolio	The via Del Oil	Bernardo Bertolucci	1966	Italia
Le Chant Des Chants	The Song of the Songs	Marcel Hanoun	1996	France
Le Plaisir	House of Pleasure	Max Ophüls	1951	France
Le Regard Blesse	The Gaze Hurts	Marcel Hanoun	1994	France
Left Aside		Tom Jarmush	1997	USA
Les Amants De Sarajevo		Marcel Hanoun	1993	France
Lost Lost Lost		Jonas Mekas	1949	USA
Luca'S Film		Marco Bechis	1996	Italia
Mat' I Syn		Alexander Sokurov	1997	Germany, Russia
Nel Profondo Paese Straniero	In the Deep Foreign Country	Fabio Carpi Carpi	1997	Italia, France
Nocturne		Yervant Granikian, Angela Ricci Lucchi	1997	Italia
Nous Sommes Tous Encore Ici	We are all Again Here	Anne-Marie Miéville	1996	France, Switzerland
Ormai Solo Un Zio Ci Può Salvare	By Now Only an Uncle can Save Us	Davide Ciprì, Franco Maresco	1986	Italia
Otage	Hostage	Marcel Hanoun	1989	France
Parresia		Rosanna Benvenuto	1997	Italia
Partner		Bernardo Bertolucci	1968	Italia
Pish	Batter	Nasser Taghvai	1997	Iran
Public Housing		Frederick Wiseman	1997	USA
Regard La Mer	Look the Sea	François Ozon	1997	France
Regard, Passion, Memoire	Look, Passion, Memory	Marcel Hanoun	1992	France
Reminiscences Of A Journey To Lituania		Jonas Mekas	1971	USA
Rostov-Luanda	Rostov-Lunda	Abderrahmane Sissako	1997	France
Ruzi Keh Khaleh Mariz Boud		Hannah Makhmalbaf	1997	Iran
Scenes From Allen'S Last 3 Days On Earth As A Spirit		Jonas Mekas	1997	USA
Scenes From The Life Of Andy Warhol		Jonas Mekas	1990	USA
Scenes From The Life Of George Maciunas		Jonas Mekas	1990	USA
Sogni Infranti: Ragionamenti E Deliri	Broken Dreams: Reasoning and Delusions	Marco Bellocchio	1995	Italia
Stilleben	Still Life	Harun Farocki	1997	France, Germany
Tarh	Wee	Abbas Kiarostami	1997	Iran
Tentative De Description D'Un Dîner De Têtes À Paris-France	Attempt to Describe a Head Dinner in Paris-France	Jean-Christophe Averty	1995	France
The Final Insult		Charles Burnett	1997	Germany, USA
Torino Boys		Antonio Manetti, Marco Manetti	1997	Italia
Un Arbre Fou D'Oiseaux	A Crazy Bird of Birds	Marcel Hanoun	1997	France
Viagem Ao Principio Do Mundo	Travel to the Beginning of the World	Manoel de Oliveira	1997	France, Portugal
Visage		Marcel Hanoun	1997	France
Von Heute Auf Morgen	Overnight	Danièle Huillet, Jean-Marie Straub	1996	France
Walden		Jonas Mekas	1964	USA
Walo Fendo	Walo Crack	Mohammed Soudani	1997	Switzerland

Locarno at Half Century, Reflections on the Future – Filmmakers of the Present

Locarno at the Half-Century, Reflections on the Future – Filmmakers of the Present
Original title	English title	Director(s)	Year	Production country
Locarno Demi-Siècle, Reflexions Sur L'Avenir: Épisode: Elena	Locarno Half-Century, Reflections on the Future: Episode: Elena	Marco Bellocchio	1997	Switzerland
Locarno Demi-Siècle, Reflexions Sur L'Avenir: Épisode: Ghosts Of Electricity	Locarno Half-Century, Reflections on the Future: Episode: Ghosts of Electricity	Robert Kramer	1997	Switzerland
Locarno Demi-Siècle, Reflexions Sur L'Avenir: Épisode: La Eta Knabino Au Kiel Oni Trovas Ian Helpon	Locarno Half-Century, Reflections on the Future: Episode: ETA Knabino at Kiel Oni Trovas Ian Helpon	Hannah Makhmalbaf	1997	Switzerland
Locarno Demi-Siècle, Reflexions Sur L'Avenir: Épisode: Le Film À Venir	Locarno Half-Century, Reflections on the Future: Episode: The Film to Come	Nasser Taghvai	1997	Switzerland
Locarno Demi-Siècle, Reflexions Sur L'Avenir: Épisode: Le Jour Où	Locarno Half-Century, Reflections on the Future: Episode: The Day when	Chantal Akerman	1997	Switzerland
Locarno Demi-Siècle, Reflexions Sur L'Avenir: Épisode: Les Parias Du Cinema	Locarno Half-Century, Reflections on the Future: Episode: The Parias of the Cinema	Idrissa Ouédraogo	1997	Switzerland
Locarno Demi-Siècle, Reflexions Sur L'Avenir: Épisode: The Birth Of Light	Locarno Half-Century, Reflections on the Future: Episode: The Birth of Light	Abbas Kiarostami	1997	Switzerland

=== Leopards of Tomorrow ===
The following films were screened in the Leopards of Tomorrow sections:

==== Short Films in Competition ====
German Short Films – In Competition
Original Title	English Title	Director(s)	Year	Production Country
12 Bilder Für Konrad	12 Pictures for Konrad	Katharina Werner	1996	Germany
Abendbrot (Sometimes I Wish To Be Somewhere Else)		Sören Voigt	1997	Germany
Ausgestorben	Extinct	Michael Pohl	1995	Germany
Brot	Fragment	Samir Nasr	1996	Germany
Buy 1 Get 1 Free		Silke Fischer	1997	Germany
Das Erbe	The Inheritance	Sylvia Dahmen	1994	Germany
Der Steuermann	The Helmsman	Stephane Schneider	1996	Germany
Die Dunklen Lichter	The Dark Lights	Thomas Kutschker	1996	Germany
Die Verlo(H)Rene Strasse	Die to See it (h) Rene Strasse	Marco Wilms	1994	Germany
Die Villa		Peter Roloff	1997	Germany
Ein Sommertag	A Summer Day	Saskia Kuipers	1996	Germany
Fake!		Sebastian Peterson	1997	Germany
Getürkt	Tortured	Fatih Akin	1997	Germany
Gräfin Sophia Hatun	Countess Sophia Hatun	Ayse Polat	1997	Germany
Halleluja	Hallelujah	Bernhard Marsch	1995	Germany
Heimatgefühle	Feelings of Home	Frank Müller	1996	Germany
Hilda Humphrey		Nick Lyon	1997	Germany
In Your Shoes		Christoph Röhl	1996	Germany
Jenseits Von Schwedena	Beyond Swedena	Janek Rieke	1996	Germany
Ku'Damm Security	And'Am Supremember	Ed Herzog	1997	Germany
Land Unter	Land under	Clemens Schönborn	1995	Germany
Living On The Edge		Luke McBain	1995	Germany
Loverfilm - Eine Unkontrollierte Freisetzung Von Information	Looverfilm - An Uncontrolled Release of Information	Michael Brynntrup	1996	Germany
Lucie & Mathilde		Mareike Fehlberg	1994	Germany
Männer Und Ihre Hobbies	Men and their Hobbies	Holger Borggrefe	1996	Germany
Nackter Himmel	Naked Sky	Stefan Sarazin	1997	Germany
Nur Für Dienstboten	Only for Servants	Claudia Amborst, Jana-Bianca Kerkhoff	1995	Germany
Pensao Globo	GLOBO THINK	Matthias Müller	1997	Germany
Stimmen Der Welt	Voices of the World	Florian Hoffmeister	1997	Germany
Surprise!		Veit Helmer	1995	Germany
The Orange Kiss		Hubertus Siegert	1997	Germany
Tout Ce Que Nous N'Aurons Pas Fait - Ob Ich Möchte Oder Nicht	Everything We Have not Done - Ob Ich Möchte Oder Nicht	Frédéric Moriette	1996	Germany
Von Der Verführung	From the Seduction	Sülbiye V. Günar	1997	Germany
Was Nicht Passt - Wird Passend Gemacht	What Doesn't Fit - Is Made Suitable	Peter Thorwarth	1996	Germany
Zwei Leben Lang	For Two Lives	Claudia Beckmann	1995	Germany
Zwei Tage Grau	Two Days Gray	Harrx Flöter, Jörg Sepmann	1996	Germany
Austrian Short Films – In Competition
Blindgänger	Unexplod	Thomas Woschitz	1996	Austria
Der Hausbesorger	The Home Supplier	Stephan Wagner	1996	Austria
Die Frucht Deines Leibes	The Fruit of your Body	Barbara Albert	1996	Austria
Die Weiche	The Switch	Chris Krikellis	1997	Austria
Eine Seekrankheit Auf Festem Lande	A Seasickness on a Fixed Country	Christian Frosh, Kristina Konrad	1996	Austria
Flora		Jessica Hausner	1996	Austria
Nachricht Von H.	Message from H.	Mirjam Unger	1996	Austria
Swiss Short Films – In Competition
Die Lebende Bombe	The Living Bomb	Walter Feistle	1996	Switzerland
Et Il Eurent Beaucoup D'Enfants	And He Had a Lot of Children	Nicolas Frey	1997	Switzerland
Frau Im Schatten	Woman in the Shadow	Menda Huonder-Jenny	1997	Switzerland
Fritz Et Franz		Gaby Schaedler	1997	Switzerland
L'Heure Du Loup	Wolf's Time	Pierre Mifsud, Vincent Pluss	1997	Switzerland
L'Uomo Con La Pioggia Dentro	The Man with the Rain Inside	Camilo Cienfuegos	1996	Switzerland
La Leçon De Monsieur Paillasson	The Lesson of Monsieur Paillasson	Michel Fessler	1997	Switzerland
Mini Händ Wärdid Rucher, Immer Rucher	Mini Hand Wildid Rucher, Always Rucher	Rudolf Barmettler	1997	Switzerland
Morte Macaca - Mort De Singe	Macaca Dead - Monkey Death	Jeanne Waltz	1997	Switzerland
Nachtwache	Night Watch		1997	Switzerland
Pampa		Bernard Weber	1997	Switzerland
Paul		Aurelio Galfetti	1997	Switzerland
Reines D'Un Jour	One Day Queens	Pascal Magini	1996	Switzerland
Samb Et Le Commissaire	Samb and the Commissioner	Olivier Sillig	1997	Switzerland
Strandsonntag	Beach	Claudio Fäh	1996	Switzerland
Too Mervellous For Words		Richard Szotyori	1997	Switzerland
Un Bouquet D'Immortels	A Bouquet of Immortals	Frédéric Landenberg	1997	Switzerland
Ölmeye Yatmak - Sich Zum Sterben Hinlegen	Lying to Die - Sich Zum Sterben Hinlegen	Esen Isik	1997	Switzerland

==== Avant Garde Film – Austria 1955-1996 ====
The following films were screened in the Avant Garde Film – Austria 1955-1996 section:

Special Program - Avant Garde Film - Austria 1955-1996 - 1
2/60: 48 Köpfe Aus Dem Szondi-Test	2/60: 48 Heads from the Szondi Test	Kurt Kren	1960	Austria
28/73 Zeitaufnahme(N)	28/73 Time Recording (N)	Kurt Kren	1973	Austria
3/60 Bäume Im Herbst	3/60 Trees in Autumn	Kurt Kren	1960	Austria
37/78 Tree Again		Kurt Kren	1978	Austria
Adebar		Peter Kubelka	1957	Austria
Arnulf Rainer		Peter Kubelka	1960	Austria
Einszweidrei	One Two Three	Ernst jr. Schmidt	1965	Austria
Film/Spricht/Viele/Sprachen	Film/Speaks/many/Languages	Gustav Deutsch	1995	Austria
Hernals		Hans Scheugl	1967	Austria
Pièce Touchee	Touchee Room	Martin Arnold	1989	Austria
Schwechater		Peter Kubelka	1958	Austria
Semiotic Ghosts		Lisl Ponger	1991	Austria
Text Ii		Marc Adrian	1964	Austria
Unsere Afrikareise	Our Trip to Africa	Peter Kubelka	1966	Austria
Special Program - Avant Garde Film - Austria 1955-1996 - 2
...Remote...Remote...		Valie Export	1973	Austria
10/65: Selbstverstümmelung	10/65: Self -Mutilation	Kurt Kren	1965	Austria
16/67: 20. September		Kurt Kren	1967	Austria
9/64: O Tannenbaum		Kurt Kren	1964	Austria
Bodybuilding		Ernst jr. Schmidt	1965	Austria
Es Hat Mich Sehr Gefreut	I Was Very Happy	Mara Mattuschka	1987	Austria
Happy-End		Peter Tscherkassky	1996	Austria
Kugelkopf	Ball Head	Mara Mattuschka	1985	Austria
Parasympathica		Mara Mattuschka	1986	Austria
Passage À L'Acte	Acting	Martin Arnold	1993	Austria
Shot-Countershot		Peter Tscherkassky	1987	Austria
The Murder Mystery		Dietmar Brehm	1987	Austria
Special Program - Avant Garde Film - Austria 1955-1996 - 3
55/95		Gustav Deutsch	1994	Austria
Ein Drittes Reich	A Third Empire	Alfred Kaiser Kaiser	1975	Austria
Heldenplatz, 12. März 1988	Heldenplatz, March 12, 1988	Johannes Rosenberg	1988	Austria
Mein Fenster	My Window	Zbigniew Rybczyński	1979	Austria
Mosaik Im Vertrauen	Mosaic	Peter Kubelka	1955	Austria
Sonne Halt!	Hold the Sun!	Ferry Radax	1959	Austria
Tausendjahrekino	Millet Anniversary	Kurt Kren	1995	Austria
Wessen Aurach, Dessen Traun	Whose Aurach, Whose Traun	Arnold Schicker	1985	Austria

==== Other Sections ====
The following films were screened in these sections:

The Davi In Cuba – Leopards of Tomorrow
Original title	English title	Director(s)	Year	Production country
Luchando Frijoles - Cuba, D'Un Jour À L'Autre	Luchando Frijoles - Cuba, from One Day to the Next	Fabrice Aragno, Jeanne Berthoud	1997	Switzerland
Sacher Festival – Leopards of Tomorrow
Cosmos Hotel		Varo Venturi	1997	Italia
Eccesso Di Zelo	Excess of Zeal	Vittorio Moroni	1997	Italia
Jahila	Juulula	Giovanni Maderna	1997	Italia
Parole Sospese	Suspended Words	Isabella Leoni	1996	Italia
Pidgin	Pidin	Andrea Gropplero	1997	Italia
Prima Della Fucilazione	Before Shooting	Salvatore Mereu	1996	Italia
Spalle Al Muro	Shoulders to the Wall	Nida di Majo	1997	Italia
ALIEN/NATION Program - Short Films – Leopards of Tomorrow
Alarm		Dietmar Brehm	1996	Austria
Biba-Non-Biba	Biba-Noba	Hänzel & Gretzel	1994	Belgium
Dar-El Beida		Tim Sharp	1996	Austria
Die Letzten Bilder Der Nacht	The Last Pictures of the Night	Paul Divjak	1994	Austria
Extract		Kristin Mojsiewicz	1994	Great Britain
Genocides		Hänzel & Gretzel	1994	Belgium
Grüezi		Jonas Raeber	1995	Switzerland
Heimkehr 1941/1966	Home 1941/1966	Michael Domes, Caroline Weihs	1996	Austria
Ich Suche Nichts, Ich Bin Hier	I'm not Looking for Anything, I'm Here	Holger Mader	1994	Germany
Mariage Blanc	White Wedding	Gustav Deutsch	1996	Austria, Morocco
Non Portare I Cani In Chiesa	Do not Bring Dogs to Church	Marco Lanza	1994	Italia
Paradigm, Part I		Shaheen Merali	1995	Great Britain
Ph/R/Ases		Sikay Tang	1995	USA
Snapspots		Kurt Kren	1996	Austria
Zehn Kleine Negerlein	Ten Little Negroes	Jochen Ehmann	1992	Germany

=== Tribute To ===
The following films were screened in the Tribute sections:

==== Condor Films ====
Original Title	English Title	Director(s)	Year	Production Country
Abb Flash		Lukas Strebel	1991	Switzerland
Auskunft In Cockpit	Information in Cockpit	Nicolas Gessner	1959	Switzerland
Bild Der Landschaft	Picture of the Landscape	Herbert E. Meyer	1968	Switzerland
Die Invasion Vom Planeten Kar	The Invasion of the Planet Kar	Peter Haas	1985	Switzerland
Fusio	Fusion	Otto Ritter	1952	Switzerland
Kuckucksjahre	Cuckoosjahre	George Moorse	1967	Switzerland
Pastoral Switzerland	The Little Girl Who Lives Down the Lane	Nicolas Gessner	1976	Switzerland
Pulsschlag Der Zeit	Pulse of the Time	René Boeniger	1954	Switzerland
Reise Der Hoffnung	Journey of Hope	Xavier Koller	1990	Switzerland, Italia
Spot Publicitaires 1950-1990	1950-1990 Advertising Spot	Jack Hill		Switzerland
Tennessee Waltz		Nicolas Gessner	1989	USA, Switzerland
Violanta	Violanta	Daniel Schmid	1977	Switzerland
Zürcher Impressionen	Zurich Impressions	Hans Trommer	1961	Switzerland
À La Loupe	Magnified	Herbert Seggelke	1961	Switzerland
==== Tai Kato ====
Bakumatsu Zankoku Monogatari	End of the Edo Period Cruel Story	Tai Kato	1964	Japan
Hibotan Bakuto - Hanafuda Shobu	Hibotan - Hanafuda Shobu	Tai Kato	1969	Japan
Hibotan Bakuto - Oryu Sanjo	Hibotan Bakuto - Oru Sanjo	Tai Kato	1970	Japan
Kaidan Oiwa No Borei	Stairs Oiwa Oysters	Tai Kato	1961	Japan
Kaze No Bushi	The Wind Claw	Tai Kato	1964	Japan
Kutsukake Tokijiro - Yukyo Ippiki	Article by Kutsukake - A Snowy Fish	Tai Kato	1966	Japan
Mabuta No Haha	The Mother of the Eyelids	Tai Kato	1962	Japan
Meiji Kyokyakuden - Sandaime Shumei	Meiji Era Guest Hall - 3rd Generation of the Lord	Tai Kato	1965	Japan
Minagoroshi No Reika	I, the Executioner	Tai Kato	1968	Japan
Otoko No Kao Rirekisho	By a Man's Face Shall You Know Him	Tai Kato	1966	Japan
Sanada Fuunroku	Brave Records of the Sanada Clan	Tai Kato	1963	Japan
Shafu Yukyoden - Kenka Tatsu	Cargo Aokiden - Fighting Standing	Tai Kato	1964	Japan

=== Retrospective – 50 (+1) Years of American Cinema ===
The section was a retrospective selected by 30 American directors tasked with choosing "underrated" films from 1946 to 1997. Some directors who selected films include Robert Altman, Martin Scorsese, and Kathryn Bigelow. The following films were screened:

Retrospective 50 (+1) Years of American Cinema
Original Title	English Title	Director(s)	Year	Production Country	Selected by
Blue Velvet		David Lynch	1986	USA	Paul Schrader
Boom!		Joseph Losey	1968	USA	John Waters
Bring Me the Head of Alfredo Garcia		Sam Peckinpah	1974	USA	John Woo
Canyon Passage		Jacques Tourneur	1946	USA	Martin Scorsese
Chimes at Midnight		Orson Welles	1966	Spain, Switzerland	John Carpenter
Ed Wood		Tim Burton	1994	USA	Paul Morrissey
House of Bamboo		Samuel Fuller	1955	USA	Barbet Schroeder
I Was a Male War Bride		Howard Hawks	1949	USA	Peter Bogdanovich
In Harm's Way		Otto Preminger	1965	USA	Jim McBride
Killer of Sheep		Charles Burnett	1977	USA	Robert Kramer
Lawrence Of Arabia		David Lean	1962	Great Britain, USA	Steven Spielberg
Lolita		Stanley Kubrick	1962	USA	David Lynch
Mrs Parker and the Vicious Circle		Alan Rudolph	1994	USA	Robert Altman
One-Eyed Jacks		Marlon Brando	1961	USA	Francis Ford Coppola
Ordinary People		Robert Redford	1980	USA	Gus Van Sant
Paths of Glory		Stanley Kubrick	1957	USA	William Friedkin
Point Blank		John Boorman	1967	USA	Wayne Wang
Pull My Daisy		Robert Frank	1959	USA	Jim Jarmusch
Scorpio Rising		Kenneth Anger	1964	USA	Paul Schrader
Spider Baby		Jack Hill	1965	USA	Sarah Driver
The Big Clock		John Farrow	1948	USA	Joe Dante
The Breaking Point		Michael Curtiz	1950	USA	Monte Hellman
The Hill		Sidney Lumet	1965	USA	Woody Allen
The Sand Pebbles		Robert Wise	1966	USA	Oliver Stone
The Swimmer		Frank Perry	1968	USA	Charles Burnett
The Wild Bunch		Sam Peckinpah	1969	USA	Kathryn Bigelow
There's Always Tomorrow		Douglas Sirk	1956	USA	Allison Anders
They Live by Night		Nicholas Ray	1948	USA	Jim Jarmusch
White Heat		Raoul Walsh	1949	USA	Clint Eastwood
Zelig		Woody Allen	1983	USA	Abel Ferrara
Beach Red		Cornel Wilde	1967	USA	

=== Cinema/Cinemas ===
The following films were screened in these sections:

Cinema/Cinemas
Original Title	English Title	Director(s)	Year	Production Country
Addò Sta Rossellini	He Gathered this Ross	Alberto Grifi, Michele Schiavino	1997	Italia
Directors On Directors		Jonathan Nossiter, Adam Simon	1997	Italia
Jean Cocteau, Mensonges Et Verites	Jean Cocteau, Lies and Verites	Noël Simsolo	1996	France
L'Uomo Dal Sigaro In Bocca	The Man with a Cigar in the Mouth	Mario Sesti	1997	Italia
Safari Be Diare Mosafer		Bahman Kiarostami	1993	Iran
Silver Screen/Color Me Lavander		Mark Rappaport	1997	USA
Un Buñuel Mexicain	A Mexican Buñuel	Emilio Maillö	1997	France

=== Film Surprise ===
Original Title	English Title	Director(s)	Year	Production Country
(Blooper) Bunny		Greg Ford, Terry Lennon	1991	USA
Ta'M E Guilas	Taste of Cherry (First Draft)	Abbas Kiarostami	1997	Iran

=== Locarno 50 ===
Original Title	English Title	Director(s)	Year	Production Country
Il Bell'Antonio	The Beautiful Antonio	Alessandro Bolognini	1960	Italia
La Ferme Des Sept Peches	The Farm of Seven Sins	Jean Devaivre	1949	France
San Gottardo		Villi Hermann	1977	Switzerland

=== Out of Program ===
Original Title	English Title	Director(s)	Production Country
Animation Phantasy		Tai Kato	Canada

=== Treasures of the Swiss Cinematheque ===
Original Title	English Title	Director(s)	Year	Production Country
Lucky Star		Frank Borzage	1929	USA
Seventh Heaven		Frank Borzage	1927	USA

== Independent Sections ==
=== Critics Week ===
The Semaine de la Critique is an independent section, created in 1990 by the Swiss Association of Film Journalists in partnership with the Locarno Film Festival. The following films were screened in the Semaine de la Critique section:

Original Title	English Title	Director(s)	Production Country
Az Ut	The Way	Ferenc Moldovanyi	France, Hungary
Berlin - Cinema (Titre Provisoire)	Berlin - Cinema (Provisional Title)	Samira Gloor-Fadel	Switzerland, France
Diese Tage In Terezin	These Days in Terezin	Varo Venturi	Germany
Off The Menu: The Last Days of Chasen's		Shari Springer Berman and Robert Pulcini	USA
R.I.P. - Rest In Pieces		Robert-Adrian Pejo	Austria
Rolling		Peter Entell	Switzerland
Verrückt Bleiben Verliebt Bleiben	Stay Crazy	Elfi Mikesch	Germany

=== Swiss Cinema ===
The following films were screened in the Swiss Cinema section:

Swiss Cinema Rediscovered
Original Title	English Title	Director(s)	Year	Production Country
L'Appel De La Montagne	The Mountain Call	Arthur Porchet	1922	Switzerland
Perspectives
Chronique	Chronic	Pierre Maillard	1997	Switzerland
Das Schweigen Der Männer	The Silence of Men	Clemens Klopfenstein	1997	Switzerland
Ghetto		Thomas Imbach	1997	Switzerland
Irrlichter	Mislead	Christoph Kuehn	1997	Switzerland, Germany
Journal De Rivesaltes 1941-'42		David Lean	1997	Switzerland
Morocco		Frank Matter	1996	Switzerland
Naturels Sur Le Vif	Natural on the Spot	Jean Couvreu, Rolf Wäber	1997	Switzerland

== Official Awards ==
=== Official Jury ===
- Golden Leopard: The Mirror directed by Jafar Panahi
- Silver Leopard: The Crazy Stranger directed by Tony Gatlif, Fools directed by Ramadan Suleman
- Bronze Leopard (Acting): Valerio Mastandrea in We All Fall Down directed by Davide Ferrario, Rona Hartner in The Crazy Stranger directed by Tony Gatlif
- Special Jury Prize: Made in Hong Kong directed by Fruit Chan, The Bible And Gun Club directed by Daniel J. Harris
- Spectator's Prize: The Full Monty directed by Peter Cattaneo

=== FIPRESCI Jury ===
- FIPRESCI Prize: We All Fall Down directed by Davide Ferrario

=== Youth Jury ===
- First Prize: The Crazy Stranger directed by Tony Gatlif
- Second Prize: Clandestines directed by Nicolas Wadimoff and Denis Chouinard
- Second Prize (New Cinema): We All Fall Down directed by Davide Ferrario
