= Leopard of Honour =

Life's work achievement award at the Locarno Film Festival

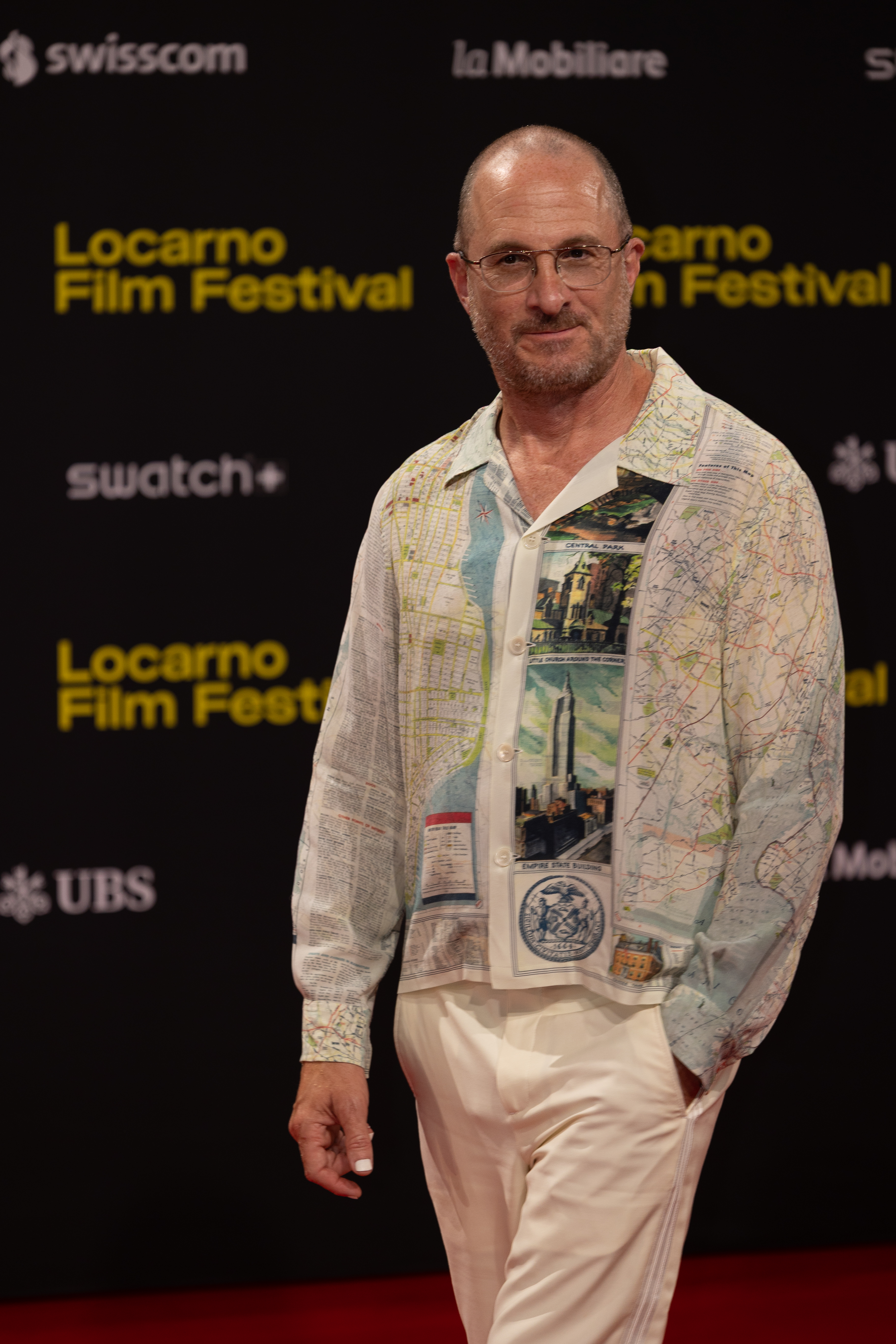
- 2026 recipient: Darren Aronofsky
- Awarded for: Career achievement
- Country: Switzerland
- Presented by: Locarno International Film Festival
- First award: 1989
- Currently held by: Darren Aronofsky

The Leopard of Honour is a career achievement award given annually at the Locarno Film Festival since 1989. The award especially denotes recognition of auteur cinema and creative and audacious filmmaking.

== Winners ==
=== 1980s ===
Year	Recipient	Profession	Nationality of Recipient	Ref.
1989	Ennio Morricone	Composer and conductor	Italy	

=== 1990s ===
Year	Recipient	Profession	Nationality of Recipient	Ref.
1990	Gian Maria Volonté	Actor	Italy	
1991	Jacques Rivette	Filmmaker and film critic	France	
1992	Manoel de Oliveira	Filmmaker	Portugal	
1993	Samuel Fuller	Filmmaker, writer and actor	United States	
1994	Kira Muratova	Filmmaker	Soviet Union, Ukraine	
1995	Jean-Luc Godard	Filmmaker	France	
1996	Werner Schroeter	Filmmaker	Germany	
1997	Bernardo Bertolucci	Filmmaker	Italy	
1998	Joe Dante	Filmmaker	United States	
1999	Daniel Schmid	Filmmaker and theatre director	Switzerland	
1999	Francesco Rosi	Filmmaker	Italy	
1999	Gerard Blain	Actor and filmmaker	French	

=== 2000s ===
Year	Recipient	Profession	Nationality of Recipient	Ref.
2000	Paul Verhoeven	Filmmaker	Netherlands	
2000	Paolo Villaggio	Actor and director	Italy	
2001	Chen Kaige	Filmmaker	China	
2001	Sundance Institute	Non-profit organisation	United States	
2001	Cahiers du Cinéma	Film magazine	France	
2002	Sydney Pollack	Filmmaker	United States	
2003	Ken Loach	Filmmaker	United Kingdom	
2004	Ermanno Olmi	Filmmaker	Italy	
2005	Terry Gilliam	Filmmaker	United Kingdom	
2005	Abbas Kiarostami	Filmmaker	Iran	
2005	Wim Wenders	Filmmaker	Germany	
2006	Alexander Sokurov	Filmmaker	Soviet Union, Russia	
2007	Hou Hsiao-hsien	Filmmaker	Taiwan	
2008	Amos Gitai	Filmmaker	Israel	
2009	William Friedkin	Filmmaker	United States	

=== 2010s ===
Year	Recipient	Profession	Nationality of Recipient	Ref.
2010	Jia Zhangke	Filmmaker	China	
2010	Alain Tanner	Filmmaker	Switzerland	
2011	Abel Ferrara	Filmmaker	United States	
2012	Leos Carax	Filmmaker	France	
2013	Werner Herzog	Filmmaker	Germany	
2014	Agnès Varda	Filmmaker	France	
2015	Marco Bellocchio	Filmmaker	Italy	
2015	Michael Cimino	Filmmaker	United States	
2016	Alejandro Jodorowsky	Filmmaker	Chile, France	
2017	Todd Haynes	Filmmaker	United States	
2017	Jean-Marie Straub	Filmmaker	France	
2018	Bruno Dumont	Filmmaker	France	
2019	John Waters	Filmmaker	United States	

=== 2020s ===
Year	Recipient	Profession	Nationality of Recipient	Ref.
2021	John Landis	Filmmaker and actor	United States	
2022	Kelly Reichardt	Filmmaker	United States	
2023	Harmony Korine	Filmmaker	United States	
2024	Jane Campion	Filmmaker	New Zealand	
2025	Alexander Payne	Filmmaker	United States	
2026	Darren Aronofsky	Filmmaker	United States	

== See also ==
- Locarno Film Festival
