= 49th Locarno Film Festival =

Film festival in Locarno, Switzerland

- Location: Locarno, Switzerland
- Founded: 1946
- Awards: Golden Leopard: Nénette and Boni directed by Claire Denis
- Artistic director: Marco Mueller
- Festival date: Opening: 8 August 1996; Closing: 18 August 1996
- Website: LFF

Locarno Film Festival
- 50th 48th

The 49th Locarno Film Festival was held from 8 to 18 August 1996 in Locarno, Switzerland. There were seventeen films in competition and a retrospective of Egyptian director Youssef Chahine. This year the festival made a big change: the competition was no longer limited to first and second feature films from new directors.

Festival chief, Marco Mueller wished to attract bigger-name established directors to the festival and get films from returning directors who made their mark at Locarno. Therefore, the festival competition was open to films from all directors, not just new filmmakers. For example, this year saw the return of filmmaker Clara Law, who won a Golden Leopard in 1992, with a new film Floating Life in competition. The festival also saw films in competition from established directors like Claire Denis and Mohsen Makhmalbaf. Additionally, some films in competition were screened on the Piazza Grande, rather the normal practice of showing all films in competition on the same screens.

The Golden Leopard, the festival's top prize, was awarded to Nénette and Boni directed by Claire Denis.

== Jury ==
- Rakshan Bani-Etemad, Iranian director
- Catherine Breillat, French director and writer
- Bernard Comment, Swiss Novelist and screenwriter
- Giovanni Grazzini, Italian critic and film historian
- Yousry Nasrallah, Egyptian film director
- Marisa Paredos, Spanish actress
- Christine Vachon, American film producer
- Barbara Kruger, American artist

== Official Sections 1996 ==
The following films were screened in these sections:

=== Piazza Grande ===
Piazza Grande

Original title	English title	Director(s)	Year	Production country
Il Giorno Della Prima Di Close-Up	The Day of the First of Close-Up	Nanni Moretti	1996	Italia
Indian Summer		Nancy Merckler	1996	Great Britain
James and the Giant Peach		Henry Selick	1995	USA
La Seconda Volta	The Second Time	Mimmo Calopresti	1996	Italia
Le Violon De Rothschild	Rothschild Violin	Edgardo Cozarisnky	1996	France
Les Voleurs	Thieves	André Téchiné	1996	France
Libertarias	Libertaria	Vicente Aranda	1995	Spain, Egypt
Microcosmos	Microcosm	Claude Nuridsany, Marie Pérennou	1996	France, Switzerland
Poussieres D'Amour - Abfallprodukte Der Liebe	Poussieres d'Amour - Waste Products of Love	Werner Schroeter	1996	France, Germany
Secrets And Lies		Mike Leich	1995	Great Britain

=== International Competition ===
International Competition (Concorso Internazionale)

English title	Original Title	Director(s)	Year	Production Country
Phantoms of the Asphalt	Afarit El-Asphalt	Oussama Fawzi	1996	Egypt
Chalk		Rob Nilsson	1996	USA
Choose a Friend ...	Choisis-Toi Un Ami...	Mama Keita	1996	France
Color of a Brisk and Leaping Day		Christopher Münich	1996	USA
Concert for a Rat	Concert Dlia Krisi	Oleg Kovalov	1995	Russia
Floating Life		Clara Law	1996	Australia
Slaughter of the Cock	I Sfagi Tou Kokora	Andreas Pantzis	1996	Cyprus, Greece
Lilies		John Greyson	1996	Canada
Marian		Petr Václav	1996	Czech Republic, France
Honey and Ash	Miel et Cendres	Nadia Farès	1996	Switzerland, Tunisia
Nénette and Boni	Nenette Et Boni	Claire Denis	1995	France
Nerolio		Aurelio Grimaldi	1996	Italia
Bread and Flour	Nun Va Guldun	Mohsen Makhmalbaf	1996	Iran
The Eye's of Asia	Os Olhos Da Asia	Joao Maria Grilo	1995	Portugal
Seven Servants		Daryush Shokof	1995	Germany
Conspirators of Pleasure	Spiklenci Slasti	Jan Svankmajer	1996	Czech Republic, Switzerland
Tiburzi		Paolo Benvenuti	1966	Italia

=== Filmmakers of the Present (Cineasti del Presente) ===
Filmmakers of the Present - Out of Competition

Original Title	English title	Director(s)	Year	Production Country
A Small Domain		Britta Sjogren	1996	USA
Automatic Writing		Ann Marie Fleming	1996	Germany
Bari - Zogon		Fumiki Watanabe	1996	Japan
Hôtel Abyssinie	Abyssinia Hotel	Patricia Plattner	1996	France, Switzerland
Impressions D'Afrique & Du Sud	Impressions of Africa & South	Karim Dridi	1996	France
L'Uomo Di Carta	The Paper Man	Stefano Incerti	1996	Italia
La Fabrique De L'Homme Occidental	The Factory of Western Man	Gérald Caillat	1996	France
La Moindre Des Choses	The Least of Things	Nicolas Philibert	1996	France
La Rencontre	Meeting	Alain Cavalier	1996	France
Le Crur Fantôme	The Ghost Crurve	Philippe Garrel	1996	France
Le Fantôme De Longstaff	The Longstaff Ghost	Luc Moullet	1996	France
Le Ventre De L'Amerique	America's Belly	Luc Moullet	1996	France
Lo Specchio Di Diana	Diana's Mirror	Yervant Granikian, Angela Ricci Lucchi	1996	Italia
Lost Book Found		Jem Cohen	1996	USA
Marseille Contre Marseille	Marseille Against Marseille	Jean-Louis Comolli	1996	France
Mes Dix-Sept Ans	My Seventeen	Philippe Faucon	1996	France
Obsessive Becoming		Daniel Reeves Reeves	1995	Great Britain, USA
Par Un Jour De Violence Ordinaire, Mon Ami Michel Seurat...	On a Day of Ordinary Violence, My Friend Michel Seurat ...	Omar Amiralay	1996	France
Sa Vie À Elle	Her Life	Roman Goupil	1995	France
Si Bleu, Si Calme	And Blue, and Calm	Eliane de de Latour	1996	France
The Arena Of Murder		Amos Gitai	1996	Israel
The Bloody Child		Nina Menkes	1996	USA
The Present		Robert Frank	1996	USA
The Willing Voyeur		Richard Kerr	1996	Canada
Tino E Tano	Sure that Applicable	Giuseppe Bertolucci	1996	Italia, Switzerland
Utazas Az Alföldön	Traveling in the Great Plain	Béla Tarr	1995	Hungary
Vento 'E Terra	Wind 'And Earth	Antonietta De Lillo	1996	Italia
Walk The Walk		Robert Kramer Kramer	1995	France, Switzerland

=== Leopards of Tomorrow ===
Leopards of Tomorrow (Pardi di Domani)

Sacher Special Program
Original title	English title	Director(s)	Year	Production country
Appunti Di Questi Giorni 1943-44	Notes of These Days 1943-44	Emanuela Gordano, Antonio Manzini		Italia
Avant Le Soir	Before Evening	Pietro Antonio Rizzo		Italia
La Place	To Place	Giovanni Maderna		Italia
La Scala Lunga Poggiata Alla Luna	The Long Scale Resting on the Moon	Alberto Simone		Italia
Silhouette		Matteo Garrone		Italia
French Short Films – In Competition
Original Title	English title	Director(s)	Year	Production Country
Alger La Blanche	Algiers La Blanche	Cyril Collard	1985	France
Au Bord De L'Autoroute	On the Edge of the Highway	Olivier Jahan	1996	France
Bien Sous Tous Rapports	Well in all Respects	Marina de Van	1996	France
C'Est La Haine	It's Hatred	Ahmed Bouchaala	1993	France
Ce Qui Me Meut	What Moves Me	Cédric Klapisch	1989	France
Chien Noir	Black Dog	Gilles Adrien	1995	France
Classique	Classic	Christian Vincent	1986	France
Comme Les Autres	Like the Others	Didier Bivel	1995	France
Comme On Respire	As We Breathe	Myriam Aziza	1995	France
Des Filles Et Des Chiens	Girls and Dogs	Sophie Fillières	1991	France
Dimanche Soir	Sunday Evening	Solange Martin	1993	France
Dis-Moi Oui, Dis-Moi Non	Tell Me Yes, Tell Me No	Noémie Lvovsky	1990	France
Emilie Müller		Yvon Marciano	1993	France
Entre Nous	Between Us	Juliette Senik	1995	France
Fierrot Le Pou	Fierrot Le to	Mathieu Kassovitz	1990	France
Film De Famille	Family Movie	Jean-Pierre Delattre	1995	France
Gorille, Mon Ami	Gorilla, My Friend	Emmanuel Malherbe	1996	France
Grandir	To Grow	Virginie Wagon	1995	France
Interim		Jean-Pierre Améris	1988	France
Jeux De Plage	Beach Games	Laurent Cantet	1995	France
L'Enfant De La Ciotat	The Child of La Ciotat	Arnaud Debréek	1995	France
L'Etrangère	The Strawberry	Françoisz Chilowicz	1995	France
La Combine De La Girafe	The Combination of the Giraffe	Thomas Glou	1983	France
La Cuisinière	The Cook	Wanda Kujacz	1995	France
La Fille Et L'Amande	The Girl and the Almond	Bénédicte Brunet	1996	France
La Mère	The Mother	Caroline Bottaro	1995	France
La Pierre De L'Attente	The Stone of Waiting	Tran Ahn Hung	1991	France
La Première Journee De Nicolas	Nicolas' First Day	Manuel Poirier	1985	France
La Rue Ouverte	The Open Street	Michel Spinosa	1987	France
La Vie Parisienne	Parisian Life	Hélène Angel	1995	France
La Vie À Rebours	Life in Reverse	Gaël Morel	1994	France
Le Baiser	Kiss Him	Pascal Ferran	1990	France
Le Chien Qui Avait Soif	The Dog Who Was Thirsty	Philippe Rony	1996	France
Le Cochon	The Pig	Partho Gupta	1996	France
Le Livre De Minuit	The Midnight Book	Thierry Binisti	1996	France
Le Mariage Blanc	White Marriage	Christine Carrière	1990	France
Le Matou	Our	Xavier Beauvois	1986	France
Le Mesange	The Mesange	Catherine Corsini	1982	France
Le Ravin	The Ravine	Catherine Kelin	1995	France
Le Soleil A Promis De Se Lever Demain	The Sun Has Promised to Get Up Tomorrow	Fabienne Godet	1995	France
Les Deux Fragonard	Both Fragonard	Philippe Le Guay	1986	France
Madame Jacques Sur La Croisette	Madame Jacques on the Croisette	Emmanuel Finkiel	1995	France
Menage	Household	Pierre Salvadori	1992	France
Never Twice		Vincent Ravalec	1995	France
Paris-Ficelle		Laurence Ferreira-Barbosa	1982	France
Poussiêre D'Etoiles	Etoiles Chick	Angès Merlet	1986	France
Presence Feminine		Erich Rochant	1987	France
Romaine Et Les Filles	Roman and Girls	Agnès Obadia	1995	France
Sang D'Encre	Ink Blood	Laurent de Bartillat	1994	France
Soigneurs Dehors!	Careers Outside!	Pascal Deux	1995	France
Tout Doit Disparaître	Everything Must Disappear	Jean-Marc Moutout	1996	France
Une Femme Pour L'Hiver	A Woman for Winter	Manuel Flèche	1990	France
Une Robe D'Ete	A Summer Dress	François Ozon	1996	France
Une Visite	A Visit	Rhilippe Harel	1995	France
Vacances À Bleriot	Holidays in Bleriot	Bruno Bontzolakis	1995	France
Virage	Turn	Ludovic Cantais	1995	France
Xxy		Jean-Charles Gaudin	1995	France
Yeti		Philippe Bridou	1995	France
Zoe La Boxeuse	Zoe the Boxer	Karim Dridi	1992	France
Zohra À La Plage	Zohra at the Beach	Catherine Bernstein	1995	France
Short Swiss Films – In Competition
Bad Trip To Mars		Fulvio Bernasconi	1996	Switzerland
Comme D'Habitude	As per Usual	Isabelle Balducchi	1996	Switzerland
D.U.M.B - Down Under Manhattan Bridge		Laurent Kibrit	1995	Switzerland
Der Astronaut	The Astronaut	Pierre Mennel	1995	Switzerland
Dr. Younamis Sagt: Warum Eine Frau Einen Mann Hassen Sollte	Dr. YOUNAMIS Says: Why a Woman Should Hate a Man	Daniel Young	1996	Switzerland, USA
Dr. Younamis' Couch		Igor Bauersima	1996	Switzerland, Germany
Endspur	Final Lane	Sabine Boss	1995	Switzerland
Entre Frère Et Soeur	Between Brother and Sister	Isabelle Blanc	1996	Switzerland
Excursion		Romed Wyder	1996	Switzerland
Idyllische Landschaft Oder Die Erfindung Der Freiheit	Idyllic Landscape or the Invention of Freedom	Judith Rutishauser	1995	Switzerland
Mon Chère, L'Escabeau, La Dinde Et Le Cabot	My Dear, the Stepladder, the Turkey and the Cabot	Cèline Macherel	1996	Switzerland
Nascondiglio - Das Versteck	Nascondiglio - The Hiding Place	Roberto Di Valentino	1995	Switzerland
Nature Morte	Death Lifes	Isabelle Singer	1995	Switzerland
Orson & Welles		Felix Schaad	1995	Switzerland
Soir De Fête	Festive Night	Hélène Faucherre	1996	Switzerland
Taxi Service		Elie Kahlifé, Alexandre Monnier	1996	Switzerland
Une Semaine Plus Tard	A Week Later	Yakup Yilmaz	1996	Switzerland
À L'Abri Du Monde	Out of the World	Frank Preiswerk	1995	Switzerland

=== Tribute To – Mimmo Calopresti ===
Tribute To Mimmo Calopresti
Original Title	English title	Director(s)	Year	Production Country
A Proposito Di Sbavature	Speaking of Smudges	Mimmo Calopresti, Claudio Paletto	1984	Italia
Alla Fiat Era Così	The Fiat Was Like that	Mimmo Calopresti	1990	Italia
Oltre Il Confine	Beyond the Border	Mimmo Calopresti	1996	Italia
Pane Pace Libertà - 1943-1945		Mimmo Calopresti	1994	Italia
Paolo Ha Un Lavoro	Paolo Has a Job	Mimmo Calopresti	1991	Italia
Remzija		Mimmo Calopresti	1992	Italia

=== Retrospective – Youssef Chahine ===
Feature Films / Youssef Chahine
Original Title	English title	Director(s)	Year	Production Country
Awat El-Ibn El-Dall		Youssef Chahine	1976	Egypt, Algérie
Bab El-Hadid	Iron Door	Youssef Chahine	1958	Egypt
Baba Amin	Baba Amen	Youssef Chahine	1950	Egypt
Bein Idek		Youssef Chahine	1960	Egypt
Biya El-Khawatim		Youssef Chahine	1965	Lebanon
Chaitan El-Sahara		Youssef Chahine	1954	Egypt
El Naas Wa El-Nil	L People and the Nile	Youssef Chahine	1968	Egypt, Russia
El-Ard		Youssef Chahine	1969	Egypt
El-Ikhtiyar		Youssef Chahine	1970	Egypt
El-Mouhaguer		Youssef Chahine	1994	Egypt, France
El-Mouhareg El-Kebir	The Big Clown	Youssef Chahine	1952	Egypt
El-Nasser Salah Eddine		Youssef Chahine	1963	Egypt
El-Ousfour		Youssef Chahine	1973	Egypt, Algérie
El-Wada Ya Bonaparte	The-Wada and Bonaparte	Youssef Chahine	1984	Egypt, France
El-Youm El-Sadis		Youssef Chahine	1986	France, Egypt
Fagr Youm Guedid		Youssef Chahine	1964	Egypt
Gamila El-Gazaeriya	Gamilal-Gazaria	Youssef Chahine	1958	Egypt
Haddouta Misriya	Haberize Misriya	Youssef Chahine	1982	Egypt
Houbb Ila El-Abad		Youssef Chahine	1959	Egypt
Ibn El-Nil		Youssef Chahine	1951	Egypt
Inta Habibi	While Habibi	Youssef Chahine	1957	Egypt
Iskanderiya Kaman Wa Kaman	Iskanderiya Save for Soking	Youssef Chahine	1989	Egypt, France
Iskanderiya Leh?	Iskedria Leh?	Youssef Chahine	1978	Egypt, Algérie
Nida El-Ochak	Nada Lovers	Youssef Chahine	1961	Egypt
Nissa Bila Rigal	When Rigal	Youssef Chahine	1953	Egypt
Ragoul Fe Hayati	A Man in My Life	Youssef Chahine	1961	Egypt
Rimal Min Dahab	Rimmer from Gold	Youssef Chahine	1966	Lebanon
Sayidat El-Qitar		Youssef Chahine	1952	Egypt
Sera Fi El-Wadi	It will be the-Wadi	Youssef Chahine	1954	Egypt
Seraa Fi El-Mina	It will be Fi-Mina	Youssef Chahine	1956	Egypt
Wadaa Hobbak	To Hobbak	Youssef Chahine	1957	Egypt
Short Films / Youssef Chahine
Eid El-Amyroun	Meron Eid	Youssef Chahine	1967	Egypt, Algérie
El-Kahira Menawara Bi Ahlaha	Cairo is Enlightened by Her Family	Youssef Chahine	1991	Egypt, Algérie
Intelak	Intelk	Youssef Chahine	1973	Egypt, Algérie
Lumière Et Compagnie	Light and Company	Youssef Chahine	1966	Egypt, Algérie
Salwa		Youssef Chahine	1970	Egypt, Algérie
Sans Titre	Unit	Youssef Chahine	1945	Egypt, Algérie

=== Cinema/Cinemas ===
Cinema/Cinemas
Original Title	English title	Director(s)	Year	Production Country
Cinema, De Notre Temps: Alain Cavalier - 7 Chapitres, 5 Jours, 2 Pièces-Cuisine	Cinema, of Our Time: Alain Cavalier - 7 Chapters, 5 Days, 2 -Rooms -Kitchen	Jean-Pierre Limosin	1995	France
Kenwin		Véronique Goël	1996	Switzerland
Les Annees Arruza	The Years Arruza	Emilio Maillö	1996	France
Ma'S Sin	My Sin	Serge Saguenail	1996	Portugal
Ninetto, Le Messager	Ninetto, the Messages	Jean-André Fieschi	1995	France
Red Hollywood			1995	USA
Ritratti D'Autore - Deuxième Serie	Play the Author - Deux d'Seri	Cristiano Bortone, Ricky Tognazzi	1996	Italia
Ritratti D'Autore - Première Serie	Author Pictures - Series Premiière	Cristina Comencini, Alessandro D'Alatri	1996	Italia
Shooting On The Nile - Voices From The Egyptian Cinema		Barbara Melega	1996	Italia
The Typewriter, The Rifle And The Movie Camera		Adam Simon	1995	Great Britain
Un Africain Nommé Cinema: Djibril Diop Mambety	An African Named Cinema: Djibril Diop Mambety	Jean-Pierre Bekolo	1996	France, Cameroon

=== Film Surprise ===
Original Title	English title	Director(s)	Production Country
Gonin 2		Takashi Ishii	Japan

=== Montecinemaverità Fondation ===
Original Title	English title	Director(s)	Production Country
Macadam Tribu	Macadam Tribe	José Laplaine	Zaire, France
Po Di Sangui		Flora Gomes	Guinea Bissau, France
Un Ete À La Goulette	One Summer in La Goulette	Férid Boughedir	Tunisia, France

=== Out of Program ===
Original Title	English title	Director(s)	Production Country
Ma Le Parole Sono Importanti	But Words are Important	Armando Ceste, Alex Vitagliano	Italia
Storia Di Un Ufficiale Di Carriera	History of a Career Officer	Gabriella Rosaleva	Switzerland

=== Special Projection ===
Original Title	English title	Director(s)	Year	Production Country
Raza		José Luis Saenz de Heredia	1941	Spain

=== Treasures of the Swiss Cinematheque ===
Original Title	English title	Director(s)	Year	Production Country
La Peine Du Talion	Talion Sentence	Gaston Velle	1906	France
La Poule Aux Rufs D'Or	The Hen with Golden Rufs	Gaston Velle	1905	France
Le Scarabee D'Or	The Golden Scarabee	Segundo de Chomón	1907	France
Metamorphose D'Un Papillon	Metamorphosis of a Butterfly	Gaston Velle	1904	France
Rapsodia Satanica	Satanic Rapsody	Nino Oxilia	1915	Italia

== Independent Sections ==
=== Critics Week ===
The Semaine de la Critique is an independent section, created in 1990 by the Swiss Association of Film Journalists in partnership with the Locarno Film Festival.

Original Title	English title	Director(s)	Year	Production Country
Around The Block		Alain Klarer	1996	France, Switzerland
Attwengerfilm		Wolfgang Mürmberger	1995	Austria
Materiale Resistente	Resistant Material	Guido Chiesa, Davide Ferrario	1996	Italia
Soul In The Hole		Danielle Gardner	1996	USA
Störung Ost	East Disorder	Schneider, Mechthild Katzorke	1996	Germany
Tabu, Dernier Yoyage	Tabu, Last Trip	Yves De Peretti	1996	France, Germany
Une Saison Au Paradis	A Season in Paradise	Richard Dindo	1996	Switzerland, France

=== Swiss Cinema ===
Swiss Cinema Rediscovered
Original Title	English title	Director(s)	Year	Production Country
Borderline		Kenneth Macpherson	1930	Switzerland
Die Ewige Maske	The Eternal Mask	Werner Hochbaum	1935	Switzerland
Menschen, Die Vorüberziehen&	People Who Pass &	Max Haufler	1942	Switzerland
Swiss Perspectives '96 / Competition
Blue Mountain		Thomas Tanner	1996	Switzerland
Capitaine Au Long Cours	Long -Term Captain	Bianca Conti Rossini	1996	Switzerland
Erhöhte Waldbrandgefahr	Increased Risk of Forest Fire	Matt Zschokke	1996	Switzerland
Markus Jura Suisse - Der Verlorene Sohn	Markus Jura Suisse - The Lost Son	Edgar Hagen	1996	Switzerland
Nacht Der Gaukler	Night of the Jugglers	Michael Steiner, Pascal Walder	1996	Switzerland
Pessoa	Person	Heinz Bütler	1996	Switzerland
Schwarze Tage	Black Days	Benno Maggi	1996	Switzerland
They Teach Us How To Be Happy		Peter von Gunten	1996	Switzerland
Swiss Perspectives '96 / Outside Competition
A Tickle In The Heart		Stefan Schwieter	1996	Germany, Switzerland
Al Centro Dell'Area Di Rigore	At the Center of the Penalty Area	Bruno Garbuglia, Ivano Orano	1995	Italia, Switzerland
Besser Und Besser	Better and Better	Alfredo Knuchel, Norbert Wiedmer	1996	Switzerland
Fourbi		Alain Tanner	1995	Switzerland, France
Il Girasole - Una Casa Vicino A Verona	Il Girasole - A House Near Verona	Christoph Schaub	1995	Switzerland
Jean Ziegler, Le Bonheur D'Être Suisse	Jean Ziegler, the Happiness of Being Swiss	Ana Ruiz	1996	Belgium, Switzerland
Kräuter & Kräfte	Herbs & Forces	Jürg Neuenschwander	1995	Switzerland
Les Agneaux	The Lambs	Marcel Schüpbach	1995	Switzerland
Noel Field - Der Erfundene Spion	Noel Field - The Invented Spy	Werner Schweizer	1996	Switzerland
Oh! Quel Beau Jour	Oh! What a Beautiful Day	Ricky Tognazzi	1995	Switzerland
Take Off From The Sand		Wageh Georg	1996	Switzerland

== Official Awards ==
=== Official Jury ===
- Golden Leopard: Nénette and Boni directed by Claire Denis
- Silver Leopard: Floating Life directed by Clara Law, Marian directed by Petr Vaclav
- Bronze Leopard: Valeria Bruni Tedeschi and Grégoire Colin in Nénette and Boni directed by Claire Denis
- Special Jury Prize: AFARIT EL-ASPHALT directed by Oussama Fawzi
- Special Mention, Official Jury: A Moment of Innocence directed by Mohsen Makhmalbaf

=== Oecumenical Jury ===
- Price: Miel Et Cendres directed by Nadia Farès
- Special Mention: Nénette and Boni directed by Claire Denis

=== CICAE Jury ===
- Prize: Choisis-Toi Un AMI... directed by Mama Keit

=== FIPRESCI Jury ===
- International critics prize: Marian directed by Petr Vaclav
- Special Mention: Tabu directed by Yves De Peretti
