= 48th Locarno Film Festival =

Film festival in Locarno, Switzerland

- Opening film: Senso directed by Luchino Visconti
- Location: Locarno, Switzerland
- Founded: 1946
- Awards: Golden Leopard: Raï directed by Thomas Gilou
- Artistic director: Marco Mueller
- Festival date: Opening: 3 August 1995; Closing: 13 August 1995
- Website: LFF

Locarno Film Festival
- 49th 47th

The 48th Locarno Film Festival was held from 3 to 13 August 1995 in Locarno, Switzerland. The opening film was the newly restored print of Senso directed by Luchino Visconti. The festival featured the first complete retrospective of Abbas Kirostami's entire filmography and had multiple Iranian film sections. The Leopard of Honor was awarded to Jean-Luc Goddard, who accepted and immediately donated the $17,000 reward to Amnesty International. Goddard was also on hand to present the first four chapters of his Histoire(s) du cinéma project, which attracted large spillover crowds. In competition, the festival featured the world premiere of Gonin directed by Takashi Ishii and Amos Poe's Dead Weekend.

The festival had no Italian films in competition this year, in part due to Italian producers refusing to agree to Locarno within the deadline as they waited to hear back from the Venice Film Festival. This irritated Marco Mueller, the artistic director and head of the Locarno festival, who ended his arrangement with the Venice festival to scout Asian films for them. Mueller told the press Venice had failed to reciprocate finding Italian films for Locarno as he had done with discovering Asian films for the Venice festival.

In addition, Mueller discussed with the press his plan to radically change the festival in the following year. Attracting talented establish filmmakers was always difficult at Locarno not just because of other festivals, but also because the competition was traditionally limited to first or second time directors. Mueller voiced his interest in creating a new competitive category for established filmmakers, while retaining the traditional new talent section. Despite its issues, Locarno continued to be a commercial success, with average ticket sales reaching 15,000 people per day.

The Golden Leopard, the festival's top prize, was awarded to Raï directed by Thomas Gilou.

== Official Jury ==
- Alfredo Bini, Jury Head, Italian producer
- Charles Burnett, American director
- Carlos Carrera, Mexican director and writer
- Edmund White, American writer

== Official Sections ==
The following films were screened in these sections:

=== Piazza Grande ===
The following films were selected for the Piazza Grande section:

English Title	Original Title	Director(s)	Year	Production Country
The White Balloon	Badkonak-E Sefid	Jafar Panahi	1995	Iran
Bombay		Mani Ratnam	1995	India
The Written Face	Das Geschriebene Gesicht	Daniel Schmid	1995	Switzerland
Man's Hope	Espoir	André Malraux	1945	France
Evidence		Godfrey Reggio	1995	Italy
JLG/JLG – Self-Portrait in December	Jlg/Jlg - Autoportrait De Decembre	Jean-Luc Godard	1994	France, Switzerland
The School	La Scuola	Daniele Luchetti	1995	Italy
Land And Freedom		Ken Loach	1995	Great Britain
Rendezvous in Paris	Les Rendez-Vous De Paris	Éric Rohmer	1994	France
Mute Witness		Anthony Waller	1994	Germany
Nadja		Michael Almereyda	1995	USA
Night and Fog	Nuit Et Brouillard	Alain Resnais	1956	France
To Hear the Birds Singing	Para Recibir El Canto De Los Pajaros	Jorge Sanjinés	1995	Bolivia
Senso		Luchino Visconti	1954	Italy
Smoke		Wayne Wang	1994	USA
To Die For		Gus Van Sant	1995	USA
Witch Hunt		Paul Schrader	1994	USA

=== Main Competition ===
The following films were screened for the Golden Leopard competition:

English Title	Original Title	Director(s)	Year	Production Country
Love is Colder Than Death	Ask Ölümden Soguktur	Canan Gerede	1995	Turkey
Haircut	Corte De Cabelo	Joaquim Sapinho	1995	Portugal
Dead Weekend		Amos Poe	1995	USA
Der Nebelläufer		Jörg Helbling	1995	Switzerland
Sweet France	Douce France	Malik Chibane	1994	France
Gonin		Takashi Ishii	1995	Japan
Guimba the Tyrant	Guimba - Un Tyran, Une Epoque	Cheick Oumar Sissoko	1993	Mali
The Last Wedding	Kivenpyörittäjän Kylä	Markku Pölönen	1995	Finland
Love(ly) Lies	Liebe Lügen	Christof Schertenlieb	1995	Switzerland
Panther		Mario Van Peebles	1994	USA
Raï		Thomas Glou	1995	France
Tropical Fish	Redai Yu	Chen Yu-hsun	1995	Taiwan
The Blue Veiled	Rusariye Abi	Rakhshān Banietemad	1994	Iran
Seven in Waiting	Sept En Attente	Françoise Etchegaray	1995	France
Target		Sandip Ray	1994	India
Institute Benjamenta Or This Dream People Call Human Life		Quay Brothers	1995	Great Britain
The Young Poisoner's Handbook		Benjamin Ross	1994	Great Britain
Tokyo Fist		Shinya Tsukamoto	1995	Japan
Goodlbye	Tot Ziens	Heddy Honigmann	1995	Netherlands
The Breath	Umihoozuki	Kaizo Hayashi	1995	Japan, Taiwan

=== Filmmakers of the Present ===
Filmmakers of the Present - Out of Competition (Fuori Concorso)

Original Title	English Title	Director(s)	Year	Production Country
Chaque Jour Pour Sarajevo	Every Day for Sarajevo	Patrick Barrat, Ademir Kenovic	1994	Bosnia and Herzegovina, France
Dukhovnye Golosa	Spiritual Voices	Aleksandr Sokurov	1995	Russia
Etat Des Lieux	State of the	Jean-François Richet	1994	France
Friends		Tom Jarmusch	1994	USA
Haramuya	Dawaya	Drissa Touré	1995	Burkina Faso
Hikayatul Sawahir A Thalath	Halitel Zohir a Three	Michel Khleifi	1995	
I Parrini - Preti Di Palermo	The Parrini - Preti of Palermo	Aurelio Grimaldi	1995	Italy
Imphy, Capitale De La France	Imphy, Capital of France	Luc Moullet	1995	France
La Biblioteca	The Library	Silvio Soldini	1995	Italy
Le Grand Jeu De La Vie	The Great Game of Life	Isa Hesse-Rabinovitch	1994	Switzerland
Lettere Dall'America	Letters from America	Gianfranco Pannone	1995	Italy
Muriel Fait Le Desespoir De Ses Parents	Muriel Makes Her Parents' Despair	Philippe Faucon	1995	France
Non Dimenticare Palermo	Don't Forget Palermo	Aurelio Grimaldi	1995	Italy
Nos Guerres Imprudentes	Ourselves Imprudent	Randa Chahal Sabag	1995	France
Oggi È Un Altro Giorno - Milano 1945 - 1995	Today is Another Day - Milan 1945 - 1995	Bruno Bigoni, Giuseppe De Santis	1995	Italy
Ogni Sedia Ha Il Suo Rumore - Ritratto Di Alda Merini	Each Chair Has Its Own Noise - Portrait of Alda Merini	Antonietta De Lillo	1995	Italy
Out of the Present		Andrei Ujica	1995	Germany
Sobyan Oue Banat		Yousry Nasrallah	1995	Egypt
Spioni	Spies	Roberto Torre	1995	Italy
Stills		Mijke de Jong	1995	Netherlands
Trying To Kiss The Moon		Stephen Dwoskin	1994	Great Britain
À Propos De Nice, La Suite	About Nice, the Continuation	Isabella Sandri	1995	France

=== Leopards of Tomorrow ===
The following films were screened in the Leopards of Tomorrow (Pardi di Domani)

Special Program (Pardi di Domani)
Original title	English title	Director(s)	Year	Production country
La Macchina Cinema	The Cinema Machine	Silvano Agosti, Marco Bellocchio	1976	Italy
Uno Due E Tre	One Two and Three	Emidio Greco	1966	Italy
Special Video Program (Pardi di Domani)
Voie De Garage	Siding	Fulvio Bernasconi	1995	Switzerland
Italian Short Films – In Competition
Original Title	English Title	Director(s)	Year	Production Country
Ade E Core	Hades and Cores	Carolos Zonars	1995	Italy
All At Sea		Anna Negri	1993	Italy
Anima E Corpo	Soul and Body	Sergio Loiacono	1995	Italy
Ba Ba Baciami	Not a Bacami	Raffaella Russo	1995	Italy
Brentano		Romeo Castellucci	1995	Italy
Ciao Amore	Hi Love	Lorenzo Mieli, Francesco Villa	1995	Italy
Dal Profondo	Depth	Andrea Costantini	1995	Italy
Di Quale Amore	Of What Love	Nello Correale	1994	Italy
Distanza Di Sicurezza	Safety Distance	Valentina Pascarelli	1994	Italy
Drogheria	Grocery	Maurizio Fiume	1995	Italy
Due O Tre	Two or Three	Armando Ceste	1994	Italy
Due		Alberto Vendemmiati	1994	Italy
Ene Mene Mu	T	Daniela Knapp	1994	Italy
Festa	Party	Carlo A. Sigon	1994	Italy
Frusta-Azioni	Whisk	Dario D'Ambrosi	1995	Italy
Gioco Da Vecchi	Old Game	Andrea Zaccariello	1995	Italy
Il Caricatore	The Charger	Eugenio Cappuccio	1995	Italy
Il Mistero Di Rosa	The Mystery of Rosa	Segatori Segatori	1992	Italy
Il Sorvegliante	The Supervisor	Francesca Frangipane	1993	Italy
L'Amico	The Friend	Roberto De Francesco	1994	Italy
L'Orecchio Ferito Del Piccolo Comandante	The Wounded Ear of the Small Commander	Daniele Gaglianone	1993	Italy
L'Ultimo Uomo	The Last Man	Beniamino Catena	1995	Italy
La Regola Del Sonno	The Rule of Sleep	Michele Fasano	1995	Italy
La Sosta	Stop	Alberto Callari	1994	Italy
La Sveglia	The Alarm Clock	Marco Turco	1994	Italy
Legami Di Sangue	Blood Ties	Domenico Liggeri	1995	Italy
No Mamma No		Cecilia Calvi	1993	Italy
Open House		Nina Mimica	1995	Italy
Passo A Passo Con Le Stelle	Step by Step with the Stars	Marcel Cordeiro	1994	Italy
People Never Change		Anita Sieff	1995	Italy
Qualche Anno Fa	A few Years Ago	Massimo Bettini	1995	Italy
Quam Mirabilis	Than Wonderful	Alberto Rondalli	1994	Italy
Quasi Una Storia	Almost a Story	Vittorio Moroni	1995	Italy
Schneeberg		Andreas Pichler	1994	Italy
Senti Amor Mio?	Do you Feel My Love?	Roberta Torre	1994	Italy
Sette Anni Son Troppo Lunghi	Seven Years are Too Long	Andrea Gropplero	1993	Italy
Sole		Roberto Di Vito	1994	Italy
Tempo Stazionario	Steady Time	Elena Gamba	1994	Italy
Un Incubo Relativo	A Relative Nightmare	Volfango De Biasi	1995	Italy
Vorrei Urlare	I Would Like to Scream	Monica Stambini	1994	Italy
Vuoto Perdere	Empty Losing	Antonio Manzini	1995	Italy
Zoo		Roberto Dordit	1995	Italy
Swiss Short Films – In Competition
100 Volte		Mariano Snider	1995	Switzerland
50% Absolut		Igor Bauersima	1994	Switzerland
Avant Le Petit Dejeuner	Before Breakfast	Cristi Puiu	1995	Switzerland
Bête De Scène	Scene	Bernard Nissille	1994	Switzerland, France
Can Girl Be Butchers Too?		Doraine Green	1995	Switzerland
Dans Le Petit Bois	In the Small Wood	Mamouda Zekrya	1995	Switzerland
Der Filmrestaurator	The Film Restorer	Adrian Remund	1994	Switzerland
En Apparence	Apparently	Olivier Zimmermann	1994	Switzerland
L'Innocence Interdite	Innocence Prohibited	Guy Maezelle	1994	Belgium, Switzerland
La Couveuse	The Incubator	Jeanne Waltz	1995	Portugal, France
Le Bonheur À Cloche-Pied	Happiness with a Bell	Jacqueline Surchat	1994	Switzerland
Le Jour Du Bain	Bath Day	Dominique De Rivaz	1994	Switzerland, Ukraina
Max		Christian Davi	1995	Switzerland
Murder - They Said!		Misha Gyorik	1995	Switzerland
Nocturne		Sandrine Normand	1995	Switzerland
Rattenfang	Rat	Stefan Jäger	1995	Switzerland
Ruben		Urs Baur	1995	Switzerland
Umbo El Samuel		Olivier Sillig	1995	Switzerland
Autuer Short films
1960		Massimo Guglielmi	1985	Italy
Altre Voci	Other Voices	Pasquale Pozzessere	1990	Italy
Andare E Venire	Go and Go	Giuseppe Bertolucci	1971	Italy
Anjuta	If	Carlo Verdone	1974	Italy
Appunti Per Un Film Sul Jazz	Notes for a Jazz Movie	Gianni Amico	1965	Italy
Black Harvest		Guido Chieso	1986	Italy
Collage Di Piazza Del Popolo	Collage of Piazza Del Popolo	Sandro Fraschini	1960	Italy
Danilo		Corso Salani	1988	Italy
Del Monte Pisano	Of Monte Pisano	Paolo Benvenuti	1971	Italy
Drimage		Silvio Soldini	1982	Italy
Eremo	Hermitage	Sandro Cecca	1980	Italy
Erostrato	Erostral	Roberto Faenza	1965	Italy
Fuori Campo	Off -Pitch	Peter Del Monte	1969	Italy
Ginepro Fatto Uomo	Juniper Made Man	Marco Bellocchio	1962	Italy
Il Cartapestaio	The Papier -Mâché	Paolo Benvenuto	1978	Italy
Il Potere Deve Essere Bianconero	Power Must be Black and White	Daniele Segre	1978	Italy
Incontro Di Una Notte Ou Antiorfeo	A Night of the Night Ou Anti -Lerfeo	Liliana Cavani	1960	Italy
La Battaglia	The Battle	Liliana Cavani	1961	Italy
La Colpa E La Pena	The Fault and the Penalty	Marco Bellocchio	1961	Italy
La Fine Del Gioco	The End of the Game	Gianni Amelio	1970	Italy
La Guerra Appena Finita	The War Just over	Francesca Archibugi	1983	Italy
La Magia È Il Profumo Della Vita	Magic is the Scent of Life	Bruno Bigoni	1980	Italy
La Torraccia		Giuseppe Ferrara	1959	Italy
La Veglia	Waking	Silvano Agosti	1962	Italy
Merci Mariù	Thank you Married	Vito Zagarrio	1974	Italy
Non Date Da Mangiare Agli Animali	Do not Feed Animals	Davide Ferrario	1987	Italy
Overkill		Maurizio Zaccaro	1982	Italy
Robinson In Laguna		Mario Brenta	1985	Italy
Stefano Junior		Maurizio Ponzi	1969	Italy

=== Histoire(s) du cinéma by Jean-Luc Godard ===
Original Title	English Title	Director(s)	Year	Production Country
1A: Toutes Les Histoires	1a: All the (Hi)stories	Jean-Luc Godard	1988	France, Switzerland
1B: Une Histoire Seule	1b: A Single (Hi)story	Jean-Luc Godard	1989	France, Switzerland
2A: Seul Le Cinema	2a: Only Cinema	Jean-Luc Godard	1994	France, Switzerland
2B: Fatale Beautè	2b: Deadly Beauty	Jean-Luc Godard	1994	France, Switzerland
3A: La Monnaie De L'Absolu	3a: The Coin of the Absolute	Jean-Luc Godard	1995	France, Switzerland
3B: Une Vague Nouvelle	3b: A New Wave	Jean-Luc Godard	1995	France, Switzerland
Appendices
Deux Fois Cinquante Ans De Cinema Français	Twice Fifty Years of French Cinema	Jean-Luc Godard, Anne-Marie Miéville	1995	France, Switzerland
Les Enfants Cinquante À La Russie	Children Fifty in Russia	Jean-Luc Godard	1994	Switzerland, France

=== History(s) of Cinema - Retrospective ===
The festival's Histoire(s) du Cinéma section showcases films deemed significant to the evolution of cinema. Films by the festival's career award winners are presented in this section.

History (s) of Cinema - Retrospective
English title	Original title	Director(s)	Year	Production country
Aerograd		Aleksander Dovjenko	1935	Russia
The Thousand Eyes of Dr. Mabuse	Die 1000 Augen Des Dr. Mabuse	Fritz Lang	1960	Germany
The General Line	General' Naja Linija	Sergei M. Eisenstein	1929	Russia
La Marseillaise		Jean Renoir	1937	France
The Taking of Power by Louis XIV	La Prise Du Pouvoir Par Louis Xiv	Roberto Rossellini	1966	France
Land Without Bread	Las Hurdes - Tierra Sin Pan	Luis Buñuel	1932	Spain
The Ladies of the Bois de Boulogne	Le Dame Du Bois De Boulogne	Robert Bresson	1944	France
The Lovely Month of May	Le Joli Mai	Chris Marker	1963	France
The Silence of the Sea	Le Silence De La Mer	Jean-Pierre Melville	1947	France
Man, God, The Monster		Ismet Arnantavic, Mirsad Idrizovic	1994	Bosnia and Herzegovina
No, or the Vain Glory of Command	Nao, Ou A Va Gloria De Mandar	Manoel de Oliveira	1989	Portugal
Not Reconciled	Nicht Versöhnt - Es Hilft Nur Gewalt Wo Gewalt Herrscht	Danièle Huillet, Jean-Marie Straub	1965	Germany
Ordinary Fascism	Obiknovennij Fasizm	Mikhail Romm	1965	Russia
The Last Stage	Ostatni Etap - Oswiecim	Wanda Jakubowska	1946	Poland
Passenger		Andrzej Munk	1963	Poland
Rome 11:00	Roma Ore 11	Giuseppe De Santis	1951	Italy
Spanish Earth		Joris Ivens	1937	USA
The Birth of a Nation		D. W. Griffith	1935	USA
To Be or Not to Be		Ernst Lubitsch	1942	USA
All the Memory of the World	Toute La Memoire Du Monde	Alain Resnais	1956	France
Young Mr. Lincoln		John Ford	1939	USA

=== Retrospective - Abbas Kiarostami ===
Feature Films - Abbas Kiarostami

Feature Films - Abbas Kiarostami
English Title	Original Title	Director(s)	Year	Production Country
The Experience	Tajrobeh	Abbas Kiarostami	1973	Iran
The Traveler	Mosafer	Abbas Kiarostami	1974	Iran
A Wedding Suit	Lebasi Baray-E Arusi	Abbas Kiarostami	1976	Iran
The Report	Gozaresh	Abbas Kiarostami	1977	Iran
First Case, Second Case	Qazih-E Shekl-E Aval, Qazih-E Shekl-E Dovom	Abbas Kiarostami	1979	Iran
Fellow Citizen	Hamshahri	Abbas Kiarostami	1983	Iran
First Graders	Avaliha	Abbas Kiarostami	1985	Iran
Where Is the Friend's House?	Khaneh-Ye Dust Kojast?	Abbas Kiarostami	1987	Iran
Homework	Masq-E Shab	Abbas Kiarostami	1990	Iran
Close-Up	Namay-E Nazdik	Abbas Kiarostami	1990	Iran
Life, and Nothing More...	Va Zendegi Edameh Darad	Abbas Kiarostami	1992	Iran
Through the Olive Trees	Zir-E Derakhtan-E Zeytun	Abbas Kiarostami	1994	Iran

Short Films - Abbas Kiarostami

Short Films - Abbas Kiarostami
English title	Original title	Director(s)	Year	Production country
The Bread and Alley	Nan Va Kucheh	Abbas Kiarostami	1970	Iran
Recess	Zang-E Tafrih	Abbas Kiarostami	1972	Iran
Two Solutions for One Problem	Do Rah-E Hal Baray-E Yek Masaleh	Abbas Kiarostami	1975	Iran
So Can I	Manam Mitunan	Abbas Kiarostami	1975	Iran
The Colours	Rang-Ha	Abbas Kiarostami	1976	Iran
Solution	Rah-E Hal	Abbas Kiarostami	1978	Iran
Toothache	Dandan-E Dard	Abbas Kiarostami	1980	Iran
Orderly or Disorderly	Be Tartib Ya Bedun-E Tartib	Abbas Kiarostami	1981	Iran
The Chorus	Hamsorayan	Abbas Kiarostami	1982	Iran

=== Cinema/Cinemas ===
Cinema/Cinemas
Original Title	English Title	Director(s)	Year	Production Country
A Personal Journey With Martin Scorsese Through American Movies		Martin Scorsese, Michael Henry Wilson	1995	USA
Arbeiter Verlassen Die Fabrik	Workers Leave the Factory	Harun Farocki	1995	Germany
At Sundance		Michael Almereyda, Amy Hobby	1995	USA
Cinematographie Lumière: Kino Vor 100 Jahren	Cinematography Lumière: Kino 100 Years Ago	Martina Müller	1995	Germany
Exterior Night		Mark Rappaport	1994	USA
From the Journals of Jean Seberg		Mark Rappaport	1995	USA
German Neurosia - 50 Jahre Pervers	German Neurosia - 50 Years Perverse	Rosa von Praunheim (coordonné par)	1995	Germany
Il Pardo Sul Lago	The Pardo on the Lake	Egidio Eronico	1995	Italy
Jean Seberg, American Actress		Fosco Dubini, Donatello Dubini	1995	Germany, Switzerland
Lumière (Le Cinema À Vapeur)	Light (Steam Cinema)	André S. Labarthe	1995	France
Musiques De Films: Georges Delerue	Film Music: Georges Delerue	Jean-Louis Comolli	1995	France
Neuf Garçons, Neuf Filles Et Un Chien	Nine Boys, Nine Girls and a Dog	Guy Girard	1995	France
Non Ti Scordar Di Me - Una Vita Per Cinecittà	Don't Forget Me - A Life for Cinecittà	Daniele Segre	1995	Italy
O Castelo Resiste	The Castle Resists	Arthur Omar	1995	Brazil
O Livro De Raul	The Book of Raul	Arthur Omar	1995	Brazil
Salam Cinema	Greetings Cinema	Mohsen Makhmalbaf	1994	Iran
Une Journee Particulière Du Cinema	A Special Day of Cinema	Yousry Nasrallah	1995	Egypt
Via Del Centenario Del Cinema		Michael Beltrami, Ruben Rossello	1995	Switzerland

=== Cinema, of Our Time - TV Episodes ===
Cinema, of Our Time (Cinéma, de notre temps TV Show)
Original Title	English Title	Director(s)	Year	Production Country
Andre Techinè Après La Nouvelle Vague	Andre Techinè after the New Wave	Laurent Perrin	1994	France
Boetticher Rides Again		Claude Ventura	1995	France
La Nouvelle Vague Par Elle-Même	The New Wave by Itself	Robert Valey	1995	France
Shohei Imamura, Le Libre Penseur	Shohei Imamura, Free Thinker	Paulo Rocha	1995	France

=== Out of Program ===
Original Title	English Title	Director(s)	Production Country
Ed Wood		Tim Burton	USA

=== Special Programs ===
Special Program
Original Title	English Title	Director(s)	Year	Production Country
Droga Che Fare?	Drugs What to Do?	Alvaro Bizzarri	1995	Switzerland
Du Fond Du Coeur, Germaine Et Benjamin	From the Bottom of the Heart, Germaine and Benjamin	Jacques Doillon	1994	France
Il Mondo Alla Rovescia	The Upside Down World	Isabella Sandri	1995	Italy
Il Pratone Del Casilino	The Praetone of the Casilino	Giuseppe Bertolucci	1995	Switzerland
Picture House		Jean-Pierre Melville	1995	Great Britain
Rainbows Of Hawaii		Emily Hubley, Faith Hubley	1995	USA
When It Rains		Charles Burnett	1995	USA
Wo Is The Monster - You Or Me?		Peter Schamoni	1994	Germany
Cartoons From Carlos Carrera
Amada	Loved	Carlos Carrera	1988	Mexico
El Heroe	The Hero	Carlos Carrera	1993	Mexico
El Hijo Prodigo	The Prodigal Son	Carlos Carrera	1981	Mexico
La Paloma Azul	The Blue Dove	Carlos Carrera	1989	Mexico
Malayerba Nunca Muerde	Malayerba Never Bites	Carlos Carrera	1988	Mexico
Musica Para Dos	Music for Two	Carlos Carrera	1991	Mexico
Un Muy Cortometrage	A Very Short Film	Carlos Carrera	1988	Mexico
Un Vestido Blanco Como La Leche Nido	A White Dress Like Nest Milk	Carlos Carrera	1993	Mexico
Iranian Filmmakers
Afsaneh-Ye Ah	Afsanah-is Ah	Tahmineh Milani	1991	Iran
Khaneh Siah Ast	The House Is Black	Forugh Farrokhzad	1962	Iran
Nargess		Rakhshān Banietemad	1992	Iran
Rabeteh	Raptesh	Pouran Derakhshandeh	1987	Iran
Zaman-E Dast Rafteh	Dast Rafteh	Pouran Derakhshandeh	1990	Iran
Zard-E Ghanary		Rakhshān Banietemad	1989	Iran

=== Virgilio Marchi Exhibition ===
Original Title	English Title	Director(s)	Year	Production Country
Cielo Sulla Palude	Heaven on the Swamp	Augusto Genina	1949	Italy
La Corona Di Ferro	The Iron Crown	Alessandro Blasetti	1941	Italy
Stazione Termini	Termini Station	Vittorio De Sica	1953	Italy

== Independent Sections ==
=== Critics Week ===
The Semaine de la Critique is an independent section, created in 1990 by the Swiss Association of Film Journalists in partnership with the Locarno Film Festival.

Original Title	English Title	Director(s)	Year	Production Country
!Devil'S Don'T Dream! - Nachforschungen Über Jacobo Arbenz Guzman	! Devil's Don't Dream! - Research on Jacobo Arbenz Guzman	Andreas Hoessli	1995	Switzerland
Carmen Miranda - Bananans Is My Business		Helena Solberg	1994	USA
Catwalk		Robert Leacock, Milton Moses Ginsberg	1995	USA
Coûte Que Coûte	At all Costs	Claire Simon	1995	France
Guangchang	GU Ang Sing	Duan Jinguan, Zhang Yuan	1994	China
Mesicni Udoli	Mesici Udoli	Artémio Benki, Julia Szederkenyi	1994	Czech Republic
September Song - The Music Of Kurt Weill		Larry Weinstein	1994	Canada
The Last Supper		Cynthia Roberts	1994	Canada

=== Swiss ===
Swiss Cinema Rediscovered
Original Title	English Title	Director(s)	Year	Production Country
Rapt		Dimitri Kirsanoff	1934	Switzerland, France
Films '95 / Short Animated Films
Grüezi		Jonas Raeber	1995	Switzerland
L'Annee Du Daim	The Year of the Suede	Georges Schwizgebel	1995	Switzerland
Movies '95 / Feature Films
Adultère, Mode D'Emploi	Adultery: A User's Guide	Christine Pascal	1995	Switzerland
Der Stand Der Bauern	The Stand of the Farmers	Christian Iseli	1994	Switzerland
Die Gemmi - Ein Übergang	The Gemmi - a Transition	Clemens Klopfenstein	1995	Switzerland
Er Nannte Sich Surava	He Called Himself Surava	Erich Schmid	1995	Switzerland
Il Bianco Che Annulla	The White that Cancels	Claudio Adorni	1994	Switzerland
Mekong		Bruno Moll	1995	Switzerland
Nah Am Wasser	Close to the Water	Marc Ottiker	1995	Switzerland
Otto John - Eien Deutsche Geschichte	Otto John - a German History	Erwin Leiser	1995	Switzerland
Porno'S Storys		Bertrand Davet	1995	Switzerland
Rendez-Vous Im Zoo	Im Zo Rendezvous	Christoph Schaub	1995	Switzerland
Terra Bruciata	Burnt	Andres Pfäffli	1995	Switzerland

== Official Awards ==
=== Official Jury ===
- Golden Leopard: Raï directed by Thomas Glou
- Silver Leopard: Panther directed by Mario Van Peebles
- Bronze Leopard: Rusaruye Abi directed by Rakhshan Bani-Etemad,
- Bronze Leopard (Best Actress): Johanna Ter Steege in Goodbye directed by Heddy Honigmann
- Bronze Leopard (Best Actor): Samy Naceri in Raï directed by Thomas Glou,
- Special Jury Prize (SwissAir): Guimba – Un Tyran, Une Epoque directed by Cheick Oumar Sissoko
- Special Mention, Official Jury: The Institute Benjamenta Or This Dream People Call Human Life
