= 51st Locarno Film Festival =

Film festival in Locarno, Switzerland

- Opening film: Mulan directed by Tony Bancroft and Barry Cook
- Location: Locarno, Switzerland
- Founded: 1946
- Awards: Golden Leopard: Mr. Zhao directed by Lü Yue
- Artistic director: Marco Mueller
- Festival date: Opening: 5 August 1998; Closing: 15 August 1998
- Website: LFF

Locarno Film Festival
- 52nd 50th

The 51st Locarno Film Festival was held from 5 to 15 August 1998 in Locarno, Switzerland. There were 11 first or second features in competition out of 20 total. The opening film of the festival was Mulan directed by Tony Bancroft and Barry Cook. It was screened on the Piazza Grande, the 7,000 seat open-air theater. The Piazza Grand also featured the international premiere of Small Soldiers directed by Joe Dante, who was awarded the Leopard of Honour for cinematic achievement in his career.

The growing importance of the Piazza Grande screens to big distributors was exemplified by the success of last years The Full Monty, which won last year Audience award. This year My Name Is Joe directed by Ken Loach won the Audience award.

During the opening of the festival, there was a public fight between the festival board, including festival president Raimondo Rezzonico, and festival director Marco Mueller. Mueller demanded more control over the budget and a three-year contract or he would resign. Some of Mueller's budgetary demands were to add AC to theaters and maintain the four languages of translation for films. However, another issue with organizers was the festival's shift towards Hollywood blockbusters under Mueller's tenure as director. Mueller had technically resigned in October, before the start of the festival, but had agreed to stay on until the end of festival. On the second to last day of the festival the jury issued an open-letter in support of Mueller.

Other problems at the festival included the theft of a large replica giant statue of the Golden Leopard and the disappearance of jury member Goran Bregovic who left the festival without informing anyone and abandoned his jury post.

The Golden Leopard, the festival's top prize, was awarded to Mr. Zhao directed by Lü Yue. The director Lü Yue, a cinematographer on many Zhang Yimou films, brought his own film to the festival without permission from the Chinese government.

== Official Jury ==
- Robert Kramer, director, Jury head
- Irene Bignardi, cinema critic
- Valeria Bruni Tedeschi, Italian-French actress
- Davide Ferraro, Italian filmmaker
- Goran Bregovic, Bosnian music composer (Left the festival early and did not vote)
- Jaqueline Veuve, Swiss director
- Two more member, was a reportedly eight person jury.

== Official Sections ==
The following films were screened in these sections:

=== Piazza Grande ===
The following films were screened in the Piazza Grande section:

English Title	Original Title	Director(s)	Production Country
Halloween H20: 20 Years Later		Steve Miner	USA
Dr. Akagi	Kanzo Sensei	Shōhei Imamura	Japan
Life Is Beautiful	La Vita È Bella	Roberto Benigni	Italia
Megacities		Michael Glawogger	Austria, Switzerland
Mulan		Tony Bancroft, Barry Cook	USA
My Name Is Joe		Ken Loach	Great Britain
The Dust of Naples	Polvere Di Napoli	Antonio Capuano	Italia
Small Soldiers		Joe Dante	USA
The Big Hit		Kirk Wong	USA
There's Something About Mary		Farrelly brothers	USA

=== International Competition ===
The following films were screened in International Competition:

Highlighted title indicates Golden Leopard winner:

Original Title	English Title	Director(s)	Year	Production Country
23		Hans-Christian Schmid	1998	Germany
Arack El-Balah	El-Calculated Liquor	Radwan El-Kashef	1998	Egypt
Beshkempir		Aktan Abdikalikov	1998	Kyrgyzstan, France
Dieu Seul Me Voit (Versailles-Chantiers)	God Alone Sees Me (Versailles-Chantiers)	Bruno Podalydès	1998	France
F. Est Un Salaud	F. is a Bastard	Marcel Gisler	1998	Switzerland, France
Fette Welt	Fat World	Jan Schuette	1998	Germany
Hors Jeu	Out of Game	Karim Dridi	1998	France
Ikinai	Suicide Bus	Hiroshi Shimizu	1998	Japan
Kurz Und Schmerzlos	Short and Painless	Fatih Akin	1998	Germany
L'Arbre De Les Cireres	The Cherry Tree	Marc Recha	1998	Spain
L'Estate Di Davide	Davide's Summer	Carlo Mazzacurati	1997	Italia
Le Monde A L'Envers	The World Upside Down	Rolando Colla		Switzerland, France
Luminous Motion		Bette Gordon	1998	USA
Meia Noite	Midnight	Walter Salles, Daniela Thomas	1998	Brazil, France
Raghs-E-Khak	Dance of Dust	Abolfazl Jalili	1998	Iran
Sombre		Philippe Grandrieux	1997	France
Titanic Town		Roger Michell	1998	Great Britain, Ireland
Tulennielijä	Firefighter	Pirjo Honkasalo	1998	Finland
Vremya Tantsora	The Time of the Dancer	Vadim Abdrashitov	1997	Russia
Zhao Xiansheng	Mr. Zhao	Yue Lü	1998	China,Hongkong

=== Filmmakers of the Present ===
The following films were screened in the Concorso Cineasti del Presente, also known as the Filmmakers of the Present Competition:

Filmmakers of the Present - Out of Competition

Original Title	English Title	Director(s)	Year	Production Country
Alger/Beyrouth, Pour Memoire	Algiers/Beirut, for Memory	Merzak Allouache	1998	France, Lebanon
Appunti, Fuori Di Me	Notes, Outside of Me	Gianni Zanasi	1998	Italia
Astromboli	Astrombol	Marco Alessi	1998	Italia
Butcher'S Hook		Simon Pummell	1996	Great Britain
C'Ero Anch'Io - Frammenti Di Lotte Di Strada	I Was There Too - Fragments of Street Struggles	Silvano Agosti	1998	Italia
Case		Rodolfo Bisatti	1997	Italia
Evolution		Simon Pummell	1995	Great Britain
Georges De La Tour		Alain Cavalier	1997	France
Giamaica	Jamaica	Luigi Faccini	1998	Italia
Heartache		Simon Pummell	1995	Great Britain
Il Cielo Della Luna	The Sky of the Moon	Massimo Fagioli	1998	Italia
In Cerca Della Poesia: Tracce E Indizi	Looking for Poetry: Traces and Clues	Giuseppe Bertolucci		Italia
Interferenze	Interference	Cesar Augusto Meneghetti, Elisabetta Pandimiglio	1998	Italia
Io Non Ho La Testa	I Don't Have My Head	Michele Lanubile	1998	Italia
La Finale	The Final	Patricia Mazuy	1997	France
Lavorare Stanca	Work Tired	Wilma Labate	1997	Italia
Légyfogo	Fly	Árpád Sopsits	1998	Hungary
Madresse Y Ke Bad Bord	A School Carried Away by the Wind	Mohsen Makhmalbaf	1997	Iran
Mes Entretiens Filmés - Chapitre 2	My Filmed Interviews - Chapter 2	Boris Lehman	1998	Belgium
Mes Entretiens Filmés - Chapitres 1 & 2	My Filmed Interviews - Chapters 1 & 2	Boris Lehman	1998	Belgium
Pas Vu Pas Pris	Not Seen not Taken	Pierre Carles	1997	France
Petites	Small	Noémie Lvovsky	1997	France
Povinnost'	Obligation	Alexander Sokurov	1998	Russia
Prometheus		Tony Harrison	1998	Great Britain
Quand La Nuit Se Fait Tango	When Night is Tango	Kris Carlier, Boris Lehman	1998	Belgium
Ray Gun Fun		Simon Pummell	1998	Great Britain
Riding The Tiger		Sze Wing Leong, Po Chih Leong	1998	Hong Kong, China
Rose Red		Simon Pummell	1994	Great Britain
Say Kom Sa	Say Com	Robert Kramer	1998	France
Secret Joy Of Falling Angels		Simon Pummell	1991	Great Britain
Sib	Light	Samira Makhmalbaf	1998	Iran
Temptations Of Sainthood		Simon Pummell	1993	Great Britain
The Falconer		Chris Petit, Iain Sinclair	1998	Great Britain
Tre Storie	Three Stories	Piergiorgio Gay, Roberto San Pietro	1997	Italia
Trent'Anni Di Oblio	Thirty Years of Oblivion	Silvano Agosti	1998	Italia
Trio		Michèle Larue	1998	France
Un Siecle Decrivains. Thomas Bernhard		Jean-Pierre Limosin	1998	France
X2000		François Ozon	1997	France
Yek Etefagh E Sadeh	Yephagha Etefrent Edly	Sohrab Shahid-Saless	1973	Iran

=== Leopards of Tomorrow ===
The following films were screened in the Leopards of Tomorrow (Pardi di Domani) section:

Leopards of Tomorrow (Pardi di Domani)
Original Title	English Title	Director(s)	Year	Production Country
Amok		Claudius Gentinetta	1997	Switzerland
Cross-Roads			1998	Switzerland
Der Filmrestaurator	The Film Restorer	Adrian Remund	1995	Switzerland
Gruezi		Jonas Raeber	1995	Switzerland
Herr Kule'S Abenteuer In Arkadien	Mr. Kule's Adventure in Arcadia	Rolf Baechler	1998	Switzerland
La Course À L'Abime	Abime Race	Georges Schwizgebel	1991	Switzerland
La Defoule	The Deflection	Séverine Leibundgut	1995	Switzerland
Lebenshunger	Hunger for Life	Isabelle Favez	1993	Switzerland
Play Again		Benjamin Kempf	1997	Switzerland
Roarsch		Daniel Young	1998	Switzerland, Hungary
Sabbat		Gisèle et Ernest Ansorge, Gisèle et Ernest Ansorge	1991	Switzerland
Son Jour À Elle	Her Day	Frédéric Mermoud	1998	Switzerland
Une Bien Brave Bête	A Good Stupid Beast	Antoine Guex	1997	Switzerland
Vision		Kilian Dellers	1995	Switzerland
Free Cinema
Momma Don't Allow		Karel Reisz, Tony Richardson	1956	Great Britain
Nice Time		Claude Goretta, Alain Tanner	1957	Great Britain
O Dreamland		Lindsay Anderson	1953	Great Britain
Special Programs - Cuisine N. 1
Der Fahnenschwinger	The Flag Wing	Mike Van Audenhove	1991	Switzerland
Halleluja	Hallelujah	Beatrice Jaeggi	1995	Switzerland
Happy End		Peter Luthi	1995	Switzerland
Plem Plem	Trial with a Trial	Hans-Jakob Fehr, Thomas Frei	1998	Switzerland
Tony		Piniel Simon	1996	Switzerland

==== Switzerland ====
Swiss Competition
Original title	English title	Director(s)	Year	Production country
A Nedjad		Frédéric Choffat	1998	Switzerland
Contrecoup	Backlash	Pascal Magnin	1997	Switzerland
Derniers Petales D'Une Marguerite	Last Petals of a Daisy	Daniel Duqué	1998	Switzerland
Des Heures Sans Sommeil	Sleeping Hours	Ursula Meier	1998	Switzerland, Belgium
Hai	Two	Tobias Ineichen	1998	Switzerland
Hell For Leather		Dominik Scherrer	1998	Switzerland, Great Britain
Hotel Belgrad	Hotel Belgrade	Andrea Štaka	1998	Switzerland
L'Heure De L'Etoile	Star Hour	Pilar Anguita-Mackay	1998	Switzerland
Le Reflet Dans L'Oeil Du Poisson Mort	The Reflection in the Eye of Dead Fish	Lewis Häusler	1997	Switzerland
Pastry, Pain & Politics		Stina Werenfels	1998	Switzerland
Pourquoi C'Est Toujours Les Trains Qui Partent Et Jamais Les Gares?	Why is it Always the Trains that Leave and Never Stations?	Laurent Nègre	1998	Switzerland
Schlorp	Slope	Aiza Bley	1997	Switzerland, Latvia
Turisti	Tourists	Robert Ralston	1998	Switzerland, Romania

==== Italy ====
Italian Competition
Original title	English title	Director(s)	Year	Production country
Abc: The Alphabetic Tribe		Susanna Schoenberg	1998	Italia
Ambiguo	Ambiguous	Fausto Pisani	1998	Italia
Block And Tackle		Andrea Serafini	1998	Italia
Celebrazione	Celebration	Monica Petracci	1998	Italia
Dolce Stil Novo	Dolce Style New	Giovanni Maderna	1998	Italia
Dove Si Guarda C'È Quello Che Siamo	Where you Look There is What We are	Marina Spada	1998	Italia
Glamour Express - Le Plaisir Du Cinema	Glamor Express - The Pleasure of the Cinema	Max Croci	1997	Italia
Gymnopedie	GETOPOPDIE	Alessandro Borrelli	1997	Italia
I 36 Colpi	The 36 Shots	Fabio Scamoni	1997	Italia
I Paladini Della Santa Provvidenza	The Paladins of the Holy Providence	Gianluca Sodaro	1997	Italia
Incantesimo Napoletano	Neapolitan Spell	Paolo Genovese, Luca Miniero	1998	Italia
La Cena Informale	The Informal Dinner	Salvo Cuccia	1998	Italia
Le Crur	The Crur	Laura Muscardin	1998	Italia
Leonard Street		Francesco Apolloni	1997	Italia
Martelli	Hammers	Roberto Naccari	1997	Italia
Mosche Bianche	White Flies	Vincenzo Mancuso	1997	Italia
Polifemo	Polyphemus	Alfredo Santucci	1998	Italia
Rose		Luigi Abramo, Davide Bertoni	1998	Italia
Swing Heil		Mara Chiaretti	1997	Italia
Trucco & Strucco	Trucco & Lard	Angelo Caligaris	1997	Italia
Un Accento Perfetto	A Perfect Accent	Nicola Sornaga	1998	Italia
Uomini E Lupi	Men and Wolves	Daniele Vicari	1998	Italia
Venceremos	We will Win	Giovanni Stefano Ghidini, Sergio Pappalettera	1997	Italia

==== Great Britain ====
Great Britain Competition
Original title	English title	Director(s)	Year	Production country
A Fly Went By		Rod Edge	1996	Great Britain, Poland
Beach Blanket Blues		Caz Gorham	1997	Great Britain
California Sunshine		David Mackenzie	1997	Great Britain
Crocodile Snap		Joe Wright	1997	Great Britain
Dead London		Thomas Q Napper	1996	Great Britain
Doom And Gloom		John McKay	1997	Great Britain
Electric Frank		John Dower	1997	Great Britain
Fork In The Road		Barrie White	1996	Great Britain
Gasman		Lynne Ramsay	1997	Great Britain
Hard Nut - A Love Story		Jim Twaddale	1996	Great Britain
I Love My Mum		Alrick Riley	1996	Great Britain
Icebergs - The Secret Life Of A Refrigerator		Nicola Hart	1998	Great Britain, USA
In Too Deep		Mehreen Saigol	1997	Great Britain
Is It The Design On The Wrapper?		Tessa Sheridan	1996	Great Britain
Jump Boy		Menhaj Huda	1998	Great Britain
Lay Of The Land		Fraser MacDonald	1998	Great Britain
Little Sisters		Andy Goddard	1997	Great Britain
Love Story		Nick Love	1998	Great Britain
One Sunday Morning		Manu Kurewa	1996	Great Britain
See Red		Shafeeq Vellani	1998	Great Britain
Seven		Shona Auerbach	1996	Great Britain, Poland
Silent Film		Malcolm Venville	1996	Great Britain
Skin			1996	Great Britain
Stone Tears		Jonathan Richardson	1997	Great Britain
Sunny Spells		Tim Holloway	1996	Great Britain
Tales From The Underground		Tim Rolt	1997	Great Britain
Teenage Rampage		Alison Murray	1997	Great Britain
The Architect		Luke Watson	1997	Great Britain
The Hole		Stephen Galvin	1996	Great Britain
The Sheep Thief		Asif Kapadia	1997	Great Britain
The Sin Eater		Terence Gross	1996	Great Britain
The Trick		Rob Green	1997	Great Britain
Yellow		Simon Beaufoy, Bille Eltringham	1996	Great Britain
Great Britain - Special Programs
A Sense Of History		Mike Leigh	1992	Great Britain
Amelia & The Angels		Ken Russell	1958	Great Britain
Breathing		Stephen Brown	1992	Great Britain
Flames Of Passion		Richard Kwietenowski	1990	Great Britain
Franz Kafkas Its A Wonderful Life		Peter Capaldi	1993	Great Britain
Fridge		Peter Mullan	1995	Great Britain
Hello, Hello, Hello		David Thewliss	1995	Great Britain
Intervals		Peter Greenaway	1973	Great Britain
La-Bas	Over There	Andrew Kötting	1993	Great Britain
National Achievement Day		Ben Hopkins	1995	Great Britain
Spotters		Peter Cattaneo	1989	Great Britain
Street Of Crocodiles		Stephen Quay, Timothy Quay	1986	Great Britain
That Sunday		Dan Zeff	1994	Great Britain
The Burning		Stephen Frears	1967	Great Britain
The Cutter		Carl Prechezer	1992	Great Britain
The Fall		Darshan Singh Bhuller	1992	Great Britain
The Short and Curlies		Mike Leigh	1987	Great Britain
The Universe Of Dermot Finn		Philip Ridley	1988	Great Britain
Treacle		Peter Chesholm	1992	Great Britain
Where'S The Money Ronnie?		Shane Meadows	1996	Great Britain
Zinky Boys Go Underground		Paul Tickell	1994	

=== Retrospective – Marco Bellocchio ===
The following films were screened in the Retrospective – Marco Bellocchio section:

Original Title	English Title	Director(s)	Year	Production Country
Abbasso Il Zio	Down the Uncle	Marco Bellocchio	1961	Italia
Diavolo In Corpo	Devil in the Body	Marco Bellocchio	1986	Italia, France
Discutiamo Discutiamo	Let's Discuss We Discuss	Marco Bellocchio	1968	Italia, France
Elena		Marco Bellocchio	1997	Switzerland, France
Enrico Iv		Marco Bellocchio	1984	Italia
Ginepro Fatto Uomo	Juniper Made Man	Marco Bellocchio	1962	Italia
Gli Occhi, La Bocca	The Eyes, the Mouth	Marco Bellocchio	1982	Italia, France
I Pugni In Tasca	The Fists in your Pocket	Marco Bellocchio	1965	Italia
Il Gabbiano	The Seagull	Marco Bellocchio	1977	Italia
Il Popolo Calabrese Ha Rialzato La Testa (Paola)	The Calabrian People Raised their Heads (Paola)	Marco Bellocchio	1969	Italia
Il Principe Di Homburg Di Heinrich Von Kleist	The Heinrich Von Hombburg Von Kleist	Marco Bellocchio	1997	Italia
Il Sogno Della Farfalla	The Dream of the Butterfly	Marco Bellocchio	1994	Italia, France
Impressions D'Un Italien Sur La Corrida En France	Impressions of an Italian on Bullfighting in France	Marco Bellocchio	1984	France
L'Uomo Dal Fiore In Bocca	The Man from the Flower in the Mouth	Marco Bellocchio	1992	Italia
La Cina È Vicina	China Is Near	Marco Bellocchio	1967	Italia
La Colpa E La Pena	The Fault and the Penalty	Marco Bellocchio	1961	Italia
La Condanna	The Conviction	Marco Bellocchio	1991	Italia, France
La Macchina Cinema	The Cinema Machine	Silvano Agosti, Marco Bellocchio	1978	Italia
La Religione Della Storia	The Religion of History	Marco Bellocchio	1998	Italia
La Visione Del Sabba	The Vision of the Sabbath	Marco Bellocchio	1988	Italia
Marcia Trionfale	Triumphal March	Marco Bellocchio	1976	Italia, France
Matti Da Slegare	Crazy to Untie	Sandro Petraglia, Stefano Rulli	1975	Italia
Nel Nome Del Padre	In the Name of the Father	Marco Bellocchio	1971	Italia
Nessuno O Tutti	None or Everyone	Silvano Agosti, Marco Bellocchio	1975	Italia
Salto Nel Vuoto	Jump on the Void	Marco Bellocchio	1980	Italia, France
Sbatti Il Mostro In Prima Pagina	Slap the Monster on Page One	Marco Bellocchio	1972	Italia, France
Sogni Infranti: Ragionamenti E Deliri	Broken Dreams: Reasoning and Delusions	Marco Bellocchio	1995	Italia
Vacanze In Val Trebbia	Holidays in Val Trebbia	Marco Bellocchio		Italia
Viva Il Primo Maggio Rosso E Proletario	Long Live on May 1st Red and Proletarian	Marco Bellocchio	1969	Italia

=== Encyclopedia Farocki ===
The following films were screened in the Encyclopedia Farocki section:

Original Title	English Title	Director(s)	Year	Production Country
Arbeiter verlassen Die Fabrik	Workers Leave the Factory	Harun Farocki	1995	Germany
Bilder der Welt und Inschrift des Krieges	Pictures of the World and Inscription of the War	Harun Farocki	1988	Germany
Der Auftritt	The Appearance	Harun Farocki	1996	Germany
Der Ausdruck Der Haende	The Expression of the Hair End	Harun Farocki	1997	Germany
Die Führende Rolle	The Leading Role	Harun Farocki	1994	Germany
Ein Bild	A Picture	Harun Farocki	1983	Germany
Ein Tag Im Leben Der Endverbraucher	A Day in the Life of the End Consumers	Harun Farocki	1993	Germany
Ihre Zeitungen	Your Newspapers	Harun Farocki	1968	Germany
Image Und Umsatz Oder: Wie Kann Man Einen Schuh Darstellen?	Image and Sales Or: How can you Represent a Shoe?	Harun Farocki	1989	Germany
Jean-Marie Straub Und Danièle Huillet Bei Der Arbeit An Einem Film Nach Franz Kafkas Romanfragment Amerika	Jean-Marie Straub and Danièle Huillet at Work on a Film to Franz Kafka's Novel Fragment America	Harun Farocki	1983	Germany
Nicht löschbares Feuer	Inextinguishable Fire	Harun Farocki	1969	Germany
Peter Lorre - Das Doppelte Gesicht	Peter Lorre - The Double Face	Harun Farocki	1984	Germany
Schlagworte-Schlagbilder. Ein Gespraech Mit Vilem Flusser	Keywords. a Conversation with a Vilem River	Harun Farocki	1986	Germany
Schnittstelle/Section	Interface/Section	Harun Farocki	1995	Germany
Stilleben	Still Life	Harun Farocki	1997	Germany
What Farocki Taught		Jill Godmilow	1998	USA

=== Cinema/Cinemas ===
The following films were screened in the Cinema/Cinemas section:

Cinema/Cinemas
Original Title	English Title	Director(s)	Year	Production Country
Cinéma, De Notre Temps: Mosso Mosso - Jean Rouch Comme Si ...	Cinema, Our Time: Mosso Mosso - Jean Rouch as if ...	Jean-André Fieschi	1998	France
Il Teatro Del Mondo: Incontro Con Tullio Pinelli	The Theater of the World: Meeting with Tullio Pinelli	Franco Giraldi	1998	Italia
In Search Of Kundun (With Martin Scorsese)		Michael Henry Wilson	1998	France
Iruvar	The Duo	Mani Ratnam	1997	India
L'America A Roma	America in Rome	Gianfranco Pannone	1997	Italia
Sud - Les Diseurs Dhistoires	South - Historical Diseurs	Mohammed Soudani	1998	Italia, Switzerland
Travelling Avant		Jean-Charles Tacchella	1987	France

=== Special Programs ===
Special Program
Original Title	English Title	Director(s)	Production Country
200 Anni D'Acqua	200 Years of Water	Fulvio Bernasconi	Switzerland
Winchester '73		Anthony Mann	USA

=== Special Projection ===
Original Title	English Title	Director(s)	Production Country
Riviera Hotel			

=== Treasures of the Swiss Cinematheque ===
Original Title	English Title	Director(s)	Year	Production Country
A Time to Love and a Time to Die		Douglas Sirk	1957	USA
Krik	The Cry	Jaromil Jireš	1964	Czech Republic

== Independent Sections ==
=== Critics Week ===
The Semaine de la Critique is an independent section, created in 1990 by the Swiss Association of Film Journalists in partnership with the Locarno Film Festival. The following films were screened in the Semaine de la Critique section.

Original Title	English Title	Director(s)	Year	Production Country
Brain Concert		Bruno Moll	1998	Switzerland
Leve Blant Lover	Live among Laws	Sigve Endresen	1998	Norway
Lucky People Center International		Erik Pauser, Johan Söderberg	1998	Sweden
Moment of Impact		Julia Loktev	1998	USA
Paulina		Vicky Funari	1997	USA, Mexico
Tinta Roja	Red Ink	Marcelo Céspedes, Carmen Guarini	1997	Argentina, France
Une Maison A Prague	A House in Prague	Stan Neumann	1998	France

=== Swiss Cinema ===
The following films were screened in the Swiss Cinema section:

Swiss Cinema Rediscovered
Original Title	English Title	Director(s)	Year	Production Country
Der Dämon Des Himalaya	The Demon of the Himalaya	Andrew Marton		Switzerland, Germany
Der Rächer Von Davos	Davos' Avenger	Heinrich Brandt	1924	Switzerland
Nach Dem Sturm	After the Storm	Gustav Ucicky	1948	Switzerland, Austria
Swiss Perspectives
Fondovalle	Valley	Paolo Poloni	1998	Switzerland
Leopold R.		Jean-Blaise Junod	1998	Switzerland
Mon Beau Petit Cul	My Beautiful Little Ass	Simon Bischoff	1997	Switzerland
More Than Dreams		Mikaël Roost	1998	Switzerland, Great Britain
Ryhiners Business		Mike Wildbolz	1998	Switzerland
Three Below Zero		Simon Aeby	1997	USA, Switzerland
Tre Meno Un Quarto... Circa!	A Quarter to Three... About!	Claudio Adorni	1998	Switzerland

== Official Awards ==
=== International Competition ===
- Golden Leopard: Mr. Zhao directed by Lü Yue
- Silver Leopard (New Cinema): Raghs-E-Khak (Dance of Dust) directed by Abolfazl Jalili
- Silver Leopard (Young Cinema): Beshkempir directed by Aktan Abdikalikov
- Bronze Leopard (Actors): Rossy De Palma in Hors Jeu directed by Karim Dridi, Adam Bousdoukos, Aleksander Jovanovic and Mehmet Kurtulus in Kurz Und Schmerzlos directed by Fatih Akin
- Special Jury Prize: Vremya Tantsora directed by Vadim Abdrashitov

=== Ecumenical Jury ===
- Ecumenical Jury Award: Titanic Town directed by Roger Michell
- Special mention, ecumenical jury: Beshkempir directed by Aktan Abdikalikov, Ikinai directed by Hiroshi Shimizu

=== Youth Jury ===
- First prize, Youth jury: TULENNIELIJÄ directed by Pirjo Honkasalo

=== FIPRESCI Jury ===
- FIPRESCI Award: L'ARBRE DE LES CIRERES directed by Marc Recha
- Special mention, FIBRESCI jury: Sib directed by Samira Makhmalbaf

=== CICAE Jury ===
- Premio Giuria CICAE: Raghs-E-Khak (Dance of Dust) directed by Abolfazl Jalili
- Special mention CICAE: Sombre directed by Philippe Grandrieux

=== FICC/IFFS prize ===
- Don Quijote Prize: Beshkempir directed by Aktan Abdikalikov
