= Fellow Citizen =

- Directed by: Abbas Kiarostami
- Written by: Abbas Kiarostami
- Release date: 1983
- Running time: 52 minutes
- Country: Iran
- Language: Persian

Fellow Citizen (Persian: همشهری, romanized: Hamshahri) is a 1983 Iranian documentary film directed by Abbas Kiarostami.

== Plot ==
In this documentary, a citizen is attempting to manage traffic in a Tehrani street and prevent people from breaking the law, which causes them to react differently and creates amusing situations.

== See also ==
- List of Iranian films
