= First Graders =

- Directed by: Abbas Kiarostami
- Written by: Abbas Kiarostami
- Release date: 1984
- Running time: 85 minutes
- Country: Iran
- Language: Persian

First Graders (Persian: ...اولی‌ها, Avvalihā...) is a 1984 Iranian documentary feature film directed by Abbas Kiarostami, in which a hidden camera follows a group of first graders during a day at school.

== See also ==
- List of Iranian films
