= Patricia Plattner =

Swiss filmmaker (1953–2016)

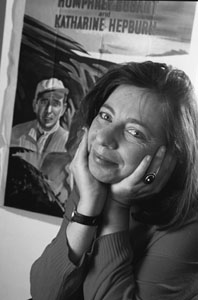
Image of Patricia Plattner

Patricia Plattner (22 January 1953, in Geneva – 5 September 2016) was a Swiss filmmaker. Between 1986 and 2009 she directed fourteen films. She was awarded a Prix UBS at the Solothurn Film Festival in 2000.
