= Richard Dindo =

Swiss documentary film director (1944–2025)

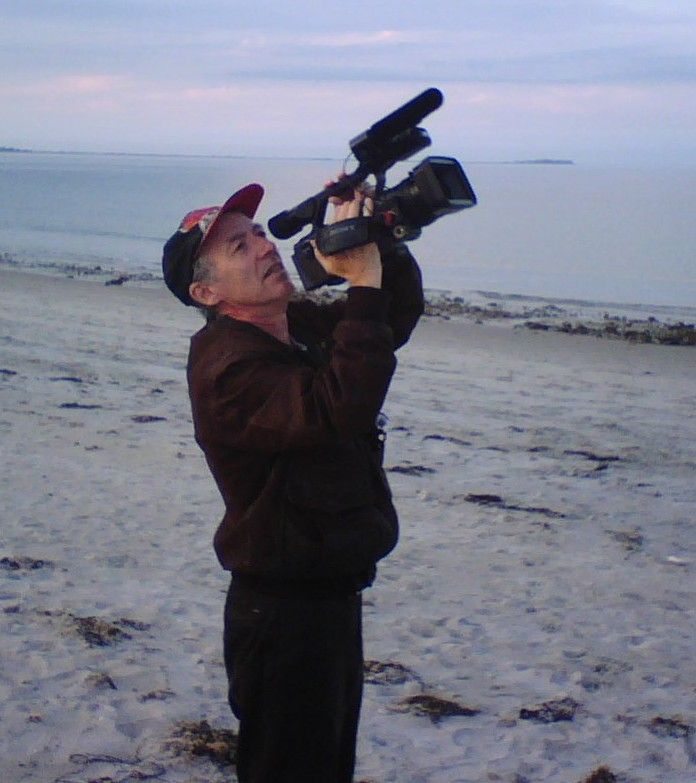
Dindo on a beach at Plymouth, Massachusetts, US, while filming background video for Mars Dreamers

Richard Dindo (5 June 1944 – 12 February 2025) was a Swiss documentary film director of Italian origin. He made his first film in 1970. Dindo died on 12 February 2025, at the age of 80.

== Background ==
Richard Dindo was the son of a construction worker of Italian origin. In 1966, he moved to Paris, where two years later he experienced the events of May 1968 firsthand. This experience had a profound influence on him.

As a self-taught filmmaker, he began working in documentary film and made his debut in 1970 with Die Wiederholung (The Repetition).

Through his politically engaged body of work, he challenged the dominant narrative and encouraged a different understanding of Swiss history. His most distinctive stylistic features were intensive research and careful reconstruction, combined with a clear political commitment.

== Filmography ==
- 1970: Die Wiederholung
- 1971: Dialog
- 1972: Naive Maler in der Ostschweiz
- 1974: Schweizer im Spanischen Bürgerkrieg
- 1977: Die Erschiessung des Landesverräters Ernst S.
- 1977: Raimon. Chansons contre le peur / Raimon – Lieder gegen die Angst
- 1978: Clément Moreau, der Gebrauchsgrafiker – über Clément Moreau
- 1978: Hans Staub, Fotoreporter
- 1981: Max Frisch, Journal I–III – über Montauk
- 1983: Max Haufler, «Der Stumme» – über Max Haufler
- 1986: El suizo – un amour en Espagne
- 1987: Dani, Michi, Renato & Max – über die Jugendunruhen in der Schweiz
- 1991: Arthur Rimbaud, une biographie – über Arthur Rimbaud
- 1992: Charlotte, vie ou théâtre? – über Charlotte Salomon
- 1994: Ernesto Che Guevara, das bolivianische Tagebuch (frz. Ernesto «Che» Guevara: le Journal de Bolivie) – Dokumentation über Che Guevara
- 1996: Une saison au paradis
- 1997: Grüningers Fall
- 1998: HUG – L’hôpital cantonal universitaire de Genève
- 1999: Genet à Chatila – über Jean Genet
- 2002: Verhör und Tod in Winterthur – Dokumentation über die Winterthurer Ereignisse auf Basis des gleichnamigen Buchs von Erich Schmid
- 2002: La maladie de la mémoire
- 2003: Ni olvido ni perdón
- 2003: Aragon: le roman de Matisse
- 2005: Drei junge Frauen (Zwischen Leben und Tod) (Trois jeunes femmes (entre la vie et la mort))
- 2006: Wer war Kafka? – über Franz Kafka
- 2006: Die Geburtstabteilung des Kantonspitals von Genf
- 2007: La Lupa, «Che fortuna essere felici»
- 2009: Die Marsträumer (The Marsdreamers)
- 2010: Gauguin à Tahiti et aux Marquises – über Paul Gauguin
- 2011: Das Musikkonservatorium der Stadt Prag
- 2013: Vivaldi in Venedig – über Antonio Vivaldi
- 2013: Frauen, die junge Männer lieben
- 2014: Homo Faber (drei Frauen)
- 2015: Das Haus der Frauen
- 2018: Die Reise des Bashô
- 2019: A Death in the Family
- 2019: A pas comptés

== Literature ==
- Ute Schneider: Richard Dindo – Regisseur, Autor, Produzent. In: CineGraph – Lexikon zum deutschsprachigen Film, Lieferung 9, 1987.
- Martin Walder: Richard Dindo, Erinnerungsarbeiter - Ein Streifzug durch seine Filme. Chronos Verlag, 2026. https://www.chronos-verlag.ch/node/29162 & https://www.nzz.ch/feuilleton/sprache-kann-mehr-ausdruecken-als-bilder-tiefe-und-ueberraschende-einsichten-in-die-filme-von-richard-dindo-ld.1923692
