= 60th Locarno Film Festival =

Film festival in Locarno, Switzerland

- Opening film: Vexille directed by Fumihiko Sori
- Location: Locarno, Switzerland
- Founded: 1946
- Awards: Golden Leopard: The Rebirth directed by Masahiro Kobayashi
- Artistic director: Frederic Marie
- No. of films: 338
- Festival date: Opening: 1 August 2007; Closing: 11 August 2007
- Website: LFF

Locarno Film Festival
- 61st 59th

The 60th Locarno Film Festival was held from 1 to 11 August 2007 in Locarno, Switzerland. There were 19 films in competition, of which, 15 were world premieres and four were international premieres. Seven of the films were from first time directors. The opening film of the festival was the anime Vexille directed by Fumihiko Sori. It was accompanied by fireworks and an opening speech from artist director Frederic Marie. The Vexille screening was immediately followed by Ingmar Bergman's final film Saraband, a last minute addition, screened in dedication to Bergman who had died that Monday.

Other films on the Piazza Grande, the 8,000 seat open-air theater, were Paul Greengrass's The Bourne Ultimatum and Robert Rodriguez's Planet Terror. Rodriguez and lead actress of Planet Terror, Rose McGowan, both attended the festival, along with Anthony Hopkins who had his directorial debut with Slipstream at the festival. Two evenings on the Piazza Grande were rained out and forced audiences inside to the Fevi, the 3,200-seat theater. The winner of the audience prize was Death at a Funeral directed by Frank Oz.

In celebration of the 60th Anniversary of the festival, many directors who had brought movies to the festival over the years returned including, Claude Chabrol, Marco Bellocchio, Raul Ruiz, Mike Leigh, Fredi Murer, Yousri Nasrallah. The festival also honored recently deceased directors Edward Yang and Michelangelo Antonioni with screenings of their films Yi Yi and Zabriskie Point.

The Locarno Excellence Award was presented to Spanish actress Carmen Maura by Italian Nobel Prizewinner Dario Fo, who told the story of his first visit to the festival 20 years earlier. The Leopard of Honor was awarded to Hou Hsiao-Hsien for his achievements in cinema.

The Golden Leopard, the festival's top prize, was awarded to Ai No Yokan (The Rebirth) directed by Masahiro Kobayashi.

== Official Jury ==
- Irene Jacob, Swiss actress, Jury President
- Romuald Karmakar, German director
- Walter Carvalho, Brazilian cinematographer
- Jia Zhangke, Chinese director

== Sections ==
The following films were screened in these sections:

=== Piazza Grande ===
English Title	Original Title	Director(s)	Year	Production Country
That Day	1 Journée	Jacob Berger	2007	Switzerland
1408		Mikael Håfström	2007	USA
Bellissima		Luchino Visconti	1951	Italia
Chicago 10		Brett Morgen	2007	USA
Cinema Mundi		Stefano De Luigi	2007	Italia
Death at a Funeral		Frank Oz	2007	USA
Hairspray		Adam Shankman	2007	USA
I Always Wanted to Be a Gangster	J'Ai Toujours Rêvé D'Être Un Gangster	Samuel Benchetrit	2006	France
Knocked Up		Judd Apatow	2007	USA
The Little Girl (Short)	La Eta Knabino (Short)	Samir	1997	Switzerland
Flight of the Red Balloon	Le Voyage Du Ballon Rouge	Hou Hsiao-hsien	2007	France
My Brother Is an Only Child	Mio Fratello È Figlio Unico	Daniele Luchetti	2007	Italia
Nothing but Ghosts	Nichts Als Gespenster	Martin Gypkens	2007	Germany
Planet Terror		Robert Rodriguez	2007	USA
The Bourne Ultimatum		Paul Greengrass	2007	USA
The Drummer		Kenneth Bi	2007	Hong Kong
The Screening (Short)		Ariane Michel	2007	France
Vexille		Fumihiko Sori	2007	Japan
We Want Roses Too	Vogliamo Anche Le Rose	Alina Marazzi	2007	Italia
Waitress		Adrienne Shelly	2007	USA
Winners And Losers		Lech Kowalski	2007	USA
Yi Yi		Edward Yang	2000	Taiwan
Zabriskie Point		Michelangelo Antonioni	1970	USA

=== International Competition ===
Highlighted title indicates Golden Leopard winner

English Title	Original Title	Director(s)	Year	Production Country
A Perfect Day		Joana Hadjithomas and Khalil Joreige	2005	France
The Rebirth	Ai No Yokan	Masahiro Kobayashi	2007	Japan
Boys Of Tomorrow		Dong-seok Noh	2006	South Korea
Capitaine Achab		Philippe Ramos	2007	France
Summit Circle	Contre Toute Espérance	Bernard Émond	2007	Canada
Extraordinary Rendition		Jim Threapleton	2007	Great Britain
Free to Leave	Freigesprochen	Peter Payer	2007	Austria
Sooner or Later	Früher Oder Später	Ulrike von Ribbeck	2007	Germany
Out of Bounds	Fuori Dalle Corde	Fulvio Bernasconi	2007	Switzerland
Haïti Chérie		Claudio Del Punta	2007	Italia
Joshua		George Ratcliff	2007	USA
The Yellow House	La Maison Jaune	Amor Hakkar	2007	France
Thieves	Ladrones	Jaime Marques	2007	Spain
Possible Lives	Las Vidas Posibles	Sandra Gugliotta	2007	Argentina, Germany
The Best of Me	Lo Mejor De Mí	Roser Aguilar	2006	Spain
Memories (Jeonju Digital Project 2007)		Pedro Costa, Harun Farocki, Eugène Green	2007	South Korea
The Golden Helmet	O Capacete Dourado	Jorge Cramez	2007	Portugal
The Rest is Silence	Restul E Tacere	Nae Caranfil	2007	Romania
Slipstream		Anthony Hopkins	2007	USA
Beneath the Rooftops of Paris	Sous Les Toits De Paris	Huner Saleem	2007	France

=== Filmmakers of the Present ===
The Concorso Cineasti del Presente, also known as the Filmmakers of the Present Competition, showcases first and second feature films from emerging filmmakers.

Filmmakers of the Present

Original Title	English Title	Director(s)	Year	Production Country
An Seh	They Save	Naghi Nemati	2007	Iran
Comme À Ostende	Like in Ostend	Delphine Lehericey	2007	Belgium
Estrellas	Stars	Federico León, Marcos Martínez	2007	Argentina
Guillaume Et Les Sortilèges	Guillaume and the Spells	Pierre Léon	2007	France
Imatra		Corso Salani	2007	Italia
Japan Japan		Lior Shamriz	2007	Germany
Juízo	Judgment	Maria Ramos	2007	Brazil
Lo Bueno De Llorar	The Good Thing About Crying	Matías Bize	2007	Spain
Loren Cass		Chris Fuller	2007	USA
Never Sleeps		Jerome Baur, Benoit Falize, Philippe Flechaire	2006	France
Nirakar Chhaya	Formless Shade	Ashish Avikunthak	2007	India
Nos Vies Privées	Our Private Lives	Denis Côté	2007	Canada
Nu Te Supara, Dar...	Don't be Upset, but ...	Adina Pintilie	2007	Romania
Nuage	Cloud	Sébastien Betbeder	2007	France
Phantom Love		Nina Menkes	2007	USA
Tagliare Le Parti In Grigio	Cut the Parts into Gray	Vittorio Rifranti	2007	Italia
Tejút	Milky Way	Benedek Fliegauf	2007	Hungary
Tussenstand	Interim	Mijke de Jong	2007	Netherlands
Xia Wu Gou Jiao		Zhang Yuedong	2007	China

=== Leopard of Tomorrow (Pardi di Domani) ===
Leopards of Tomorrow - Special Program
Original Title	English Title	Director(s)	Year	Production Country
Article 03		Frederic Choffat, Julie Gilbert	2007	Switzerland
Bouly, Le Campeur	Bouly, the Camper	Anthony Vouardoux	2007	Switzerland
Croire	Believe	François Rossier	2007	Switzerland
Der Illettrist	The Illetistist	Stefan Hillebrand, Oliver Paulus	2007	Switzerland
Le Ciel Sur Locarno	The Sky on Locarno	Michele Lamassa	2007	Switzerland
Selma		Bernie Forster	2006	Switzerland
Un Altro Mondo	Another World	Mohammed Soudani	2007	Switzerland

==== International Competition ====
Concorso Internazionale

International Competition - Leopards of Tomorrow
Anémone	Anemone	Nathalie Teirlinck	2007	Belgium
Bende Sira (Ich Bin Dran)	Bend Sira (I'm on)	Ismet Erguen	2007	Germany
Blue Collars And Buttercups		Janis Pugh	2007	Great Britain
Braedrabylta		Grímur Hákonarson	2007	Iceland
Dora		Sergio Basso	2007	Italia
Dust Bowl Ha! Ha!		Sébastien Pilote	2007	Canada
Granitsa	Border	Vanja D'Alcantara	2006	Belgium
Hoy No Estoy	I Am not Today	Gustavo Taretto	2007	Argentina
Kaffepausen	Coffee Break	Johannes Pico Geerdsen	2007	Denmark
Kin		Stephen Carroll	2006	Australia
L'Armée Des Fourmis	The Fourmis Army	Wissam Charaf	2007	France
L'Inconnu	The Unknown	Aurélien Vernhes-Lermusiaux	2007	France
Le Café Des Pêcheurs	Fishermen's Coffee	Al Hadi Ulad Mohand	2007	France
Mein Vater Schläft	My Father Sleeps	Grzegorz Muskala	2007	Germany
Pig And Shakespeare		Geon Kim	2007	South Korea
Rewind		Atul Taishete	2007	India
The Soldier'S Wife		John (J.B.) Herndon	2007	USA
Tongue Tied		Ken Wardrop	2007	Ireland
Valuri	Values	Adrian Sitaru	2007	Romania
Waltzes And Tangos From The Village Of Whitewater		Ivan Vladimirov	2007	Bulgaria
Wing, The Fish That Talked Back		Ricky Rijneke	2007	Netherlands
Zohar		Yasmine Novak	2007	Israel

==== Swiss Competition ====
Swiss Competition – Leopards of Tomorrow
Original Title	English Title	Director(s)	Year	Production Country
Anche Fiori A Volte	Even Flowers Sometimes	Zijad Ibrahimovic	2007	Switzerland
Clandestins	Illegal	Shirin Mashayekh	2007	Switzerland
Fathom		Vladimir Jedlicka	2007	Switzerland
Ferien	Holiday	Memi Beltrame	2007	Switzerland
Icebergs		Germinal Roaux	2007	Switzerland
Il Neige À Marrakech	It Snows in Marrakech	Hicham Alhayat	2006	Switzerland
Landleben	Country Life	Lukas Egger	2007	Switzerland
Latitude 2023		Florence Guillermin	2006	Switzerland
Lostage		Bettina Eberhard	2007	Germany
Ménagerie Intérieure	Interior Menagerie	Nadège De Benoit-Luthy	2007	Switzerland
Null Grad		Claudia Lorenz	2006	Switzerland
Orloj	Astronomical Clock	Jeanne Rektorik	2007	Switzerland
René		Tobias Nölle	2007	Switzerland
Sale Gosse		Joëlle Bacchetta	2007	Switzerland
The Little Samurai		Lorenz Merz	2006	Switzerland
The Study Of Bunkers & Mounds In A Temperate Climate (Relatively Speaking)		Sebastian Michael	2006	Great Britain
Twist		Alexia Walther	2006	Switzerland

=== Open Doors: Screenings ===
The Open Doors section is dedicated to film and filmmakers from different regions around the world. This year the section was dedicated to films from the Middle East, including films from Jordan, Syria, Lebanon, Egypt, Palestine and Israel.

Open Doors – Middle East (Mashrek)

Original Title	English Title	Director(s)	Year	Production Country
Ana Alati Tahmol Azouhour Ila Qabriha	I Am the One Who Shows Her Grave	Hala Alabdalla, Ammar Albeik	2006	Syria
Ard Al-Khof		Daoud Abdel Sayed	1999	Egypt
Atash	Attempted	Tawfik Abu Wael	2004	Israel
Avdei Hashem		Hadar Friedlich	2002	Israel
Baghdad Days		Hiba Bassem	2005	Great Britain
Be Quiet		Sameh Zoabi	2005	France
Ertijal		Raed Andoni	2005	Palestine
Hatiyul Hapnimi		Ra'anan Alexandrowicz	2001	Israel
Hessed Shel Emet		Shalom Hager	2002	Israel
Hown Wa Hounyk		Nadine Khan	2004	Egypt
Lamma Hikyit Maryam		Assad Foulakdar	2000	Lebanon
Le Voyage De Rabia	Rabia's Trip	Meyar Al Roumi	2006	France
Maarek Hob		Danielle Arbid	2004	France
Or (My Treasure)		Keren Yedaya	2004	Israel
Prêt-À-Porter Imm Ali	Imm Ali Ready-to-Wear	Dima El-Horr	2001	France
Ramad		Joana Hadjithomas	2003	France
Sahar El Layali	Layali Magic	Hany Khalifa	2003	Egypt
Sharar	The Waste	Hazim Bitar, Saleh Kasem, Ammar Quttaineh	2006	Giordania
Taht Alsakf	Will be Alsakf	Nidal Al-Dibs	2005	Syria
Underexposure		Oday Rasheed	2005	Iraq
Wahed Fe El Million		Nadine Khan	2006	Egypt
Yaoumiyat Beirut: Hakaek Wa Akatheeb	Yummy Beirut: Hakek Wa Agathib	Mai Masri	2006	Lebanon
Youm El-Ethneen		Tamer El Said	2004	Egypt

=== Here And Away ===
Original Title	English Title	Director(s)	Year	Production Country
15 Minutos De Gloria	15 Minutes of Glory	Paula de Luque	2007	Argentina
A Day in the Country		Sylvie Michel	2007	Germany
A Friend Like None		Toh Hai Leong, Chew Tze Chuan	2007	Singapour
Agora Tu	Now you	Jeanne Waltz	2007	Portugal
Copacabana		Martín Rejtman	2006	Argentina
Crime and Punishment		LIANG Zhao	2007	China
Dutti Der Riese	Dutti the Giant	Martin Witz	2007	Switzerland
Einspruch V	Objection v	Rolando Colla	2007	Switzerland
Handerson E As Horas	Handerson and the Hours	Kiko Goifman	2007	Brazil
Harat	Rock	Sepideh Farsi	2007	France
I Promessi Sposi		Massimo D'Anolfi, Martina Parenti	2007	Italia
I Want to be a Pilot		Diego Quemada-Diez	2006	Spain
Ici Et Ailleurs	Here and Elsewhere	Jean-Luc Godard, Anne-Marie Miéville	1974	France
Il Pianto Della Statua	The Cry of the Statue	Elisabetta Sgarbi	2007	Italia
Il Viaggio Di Gesù	The Journey of Jesus	Sergio Basso	2007	Italia
Independenta Romaniei	The Independence of Romania	Grigore Brezeanu, Aristide Demetriade	1912	Romania
Io Non Sono Un Moderato	I Am not a Moderate	Andrea Nobile	2007	Italia
Kadin	Woman	Adolfo Alix Jr.	2007	Philippines
L'An Prochain À Jérusalem	Next Year in Jerusalem	Myriam Aziza	2006	France
La Capture	Capture	Carole Laure	2007	Canada
La Danse De L'Enchanteresse	The Dance of the Enchantress	Brigitte Chataignier, Adoor Gopalakrishnan	2007	France
La Nostra Chiesa	Our Church	Guido Chiesa, Enzo Mercuri	2007	Italia
La Señal De Kell	Kell's Signal	Rodrigo Moreno	2007	Argentina
Le Créneau	The Niche	Frédéric Mermoud	2007	France
Le Retour Des Cinéphiles	The Return of Moviegoers	Louis Skorecki	2007	France
Little Moth		Tao Peng	2007	China
Morceaux De Conversations Avec Jean-Luc Godard	Pieces of Conversations with Jean-Luc Godard	Alain Fleischer	2007	France
Mots D'Après La Guerre	Warning Words	Anouar Brahem	2007	Tunisia
Mujeres Elefante	Elephant Women	Adrián Caetano	2007	Argentina
Palestines	Palestinian	Etienne Beurier, Thomas Ellis, Constantin Simon	2007	France
Petite Flamme	Small Flame	Eric Morfaux	2007	France
Preussisch Gangstar	Preussian Gangstar	Irma-Kinga Stelmach, Bartosz Werner	2007	Germany
Rockarbëresh	Rockarb	Salvo Cuccia	2007	Italia
Salata Baladi	Ballad Salad	Nadia Kamel	2007	Egypt
Sally Gross - The Pleasure of Stillness		Albert Maysles, Kristen Nutile	2007	USA
Shake the Devil Off		Peter Entell	2007	Switzerland
Stopped in Her Tracks		Susan Brockman	1978	USA
To Walk Without Fear		Louis Kornfeld, Boro Vukadinovic	2006	USA
Uguns	Fire	Laila Pakalniņa	2007	Latvia
Upa! Una Pelicula Argentina	UPA! an Argentine Movie	Tamae Garateguy, Santiago Giralt, Camila Toker	2006	Argentina
Urgente	Urgent		2007	Argentina
Wierszalin	Poem	Francesco Carrozzini	2007	USA

=== Tribute To - Edward Yang ===
Tribute To Edward Yang
Original Title	English Title	Director(s)	Year	Production Country
Qingmei Zhuma	Taipei Story	Edward Yang	1985	Taiwan

=== Retrospective - Return To Locarno ===
Retrospective - Return To Locarno
Fest	Original title	English title	Director(s)	Year	Production country
11th	Le Beau Serge	Handsome Serge	Claude Chabrol	1958	France
17th	Os Verdes Anos	The Green Years	Paulo Rocha	1963	Portugal
18th	I Pugni In Tasca	Fists in the Pocket	Marco Bellocchio	1965	Italia
22nd	Charles, Mort Ou Vif	Charles, Dead or Alive	Alain Tanner	1969	Switzerland
22nd	Tres Tristes Tigres	Three Sad Tigers	Raúl Ruiz	1968	Chile
25th	Bleak Moments		Mike Leigh	1971	Great Britain
33rd	Maledetti Vi Amerò	To Love the Damned	Marco Tullio Giordana	1980	Italia
35th	Wênd Kûuni	God's Gift	Gaston Kaboré	1982	Burkina Faso
	Buud Yam		Gaston Kaboré	1997	Burkina Faso
38th	Höhenfeuer	Alpine Fire	Fredi M. Murer	1985	Switzerland
38th	Mukhamukham		Adoor Gopalakrishnan	1984	India
40th	Álmodozások Kora	Age of Illusions	István Szabó	1964	Hungary
41st	36 Fillette	Junior Size 36	Catherine Breillat	1988	France
42nd	Marcides	Marked	Yousry Nasrallah	1993	Egypt
42nd	Piravi	The Birth	Shaji N. Karun	1988	India
45th	El Cielo Sube	The Sky Rises	Marc Recha	1991	Spain
48th	Rusariye Abi	The Blue Veiled	Rakhshān Banietemad	1995	Iran
51st	Beshkempir		Aktan Arim Kubat	1998	Kyrgyzstan
55th	Tan De Repente	Suddenly	Diego Lerman	2002	Argentina

=== Juries Film ===
Original Title	English Title	Director(s)	Year	Production Country
Alex		José Alcala	2005	France
Ba'D As-Sama' Al-Akhirah	With the Last Contract	Alia Arasoughly	2007	Palestine
Das Fräulein		Andrea Štaka	2006	Switzerland
Hamburger Lektionen	Hamburg Lessons	Romuald Karmakar	2006	Germany
Horst Buchholz...Mein Papa		Christopher Buchholz	2005	Germany
Hotel Belgrad	Hotel Belgrade	Andrea Štaka	1998	Switzerland
In Memoria Di Me	In Memory of Me	Saverio Costanzo	2007	Italia
Johanna		Kornél Mundruczó	2005	Hungary
Kurpe	The Shoe	Laila Pakalniņa	1998	Germany
L'Orchestra Di Piazza Vittorio	The Orchestra of Piazza Vittorio	Agostino Ferrente	2006	Italia
La Double Vie De Véronique	Véronique's Double Life	Krzysztof Kieślowski	1991	France
Moacir - Arte Bruta	Moacir - Gross Art	Walter Carvalho	2005	Brazil
Platform - Zhantai	Platform - Zhan Too	Jia Zhangke	2000	Hong Kong
Satin Rouge	Red Satin	Raja Amari	2002	Tunisia
Son frère	His Brother	Patrice Chéreau	2002	France

=== Ladies and Gentlemen ===
Ladies and Gentlemen (Signore e Signore)

Original Title	English Title	Director(s)	Year	Production Country
Dramma Della Gelosia	Drama of Jealousy	Ettore Scola	1970	Italia
Giulietta Degli Spiriti	Juliet of the Spirits	Federico Fellini	1965	Italia
Il Fantasma Dell'Opera	The Phantom of the Opera	Dario Argento	1998	Italia
Il vedovo	The Widower	Dino Risi	1959	Italia
Io La Conoscevo Bene	I Knew Her Well	Antonio Pietrangeli	1965	Italia
La Ciociara	Two Women	Vittorio De Sica	1960	Italia
La Finestra Di Fronte	The Front Window	Ferzan Özpetek	2003	Italia
La Nonna Sabella	Grandmother Sabella	Dino Risi	1957	Italia
La Ragazza Con La Valigia	The Girl with the Suitcase	Valerio Zurlini	1960	Italia
La Signora Senza Camelie	The Lady Without Camelias	Michelangelo Antonioni	1953	Italia
La Stanza Del Figlio	The Son of the Son		2001	Italia
La Stanza Del Vescovo	The Bishop's Room	Dino Risi	1977	Italia
La visita	The Visit	Antonio Pietrangeli	1963	Italia
Maledetto Il Giorno Che Ti Ho Incontrato	Cursed the Day I Met you	Carlo Verdone	1992	Italia
Malèna		Giuseppe Tornatore	2000	Italia
Mimì Metallurgico Ferito Nell'Onore	Mimì Metallurgical Wounded in Honor	Lina Wertmüller	1972	Italia
Pane Amore E Fantasia	Bread Love and Fantasy	Luigi Comencini	1953	Italia
Piccolo Mondo Antico	Small Ancient World	Mario Soldati	1941	Italia
Teorema		Pier Paolo Pasolini	1968	Italia

=== Play Forward ===
Original Title	English Title	Director(s)	Year	Production Country
(Posthume)	(Posthumous)	Ghassan Salhab	2007	Lebanon
3		Suwami Nogami	2006	Japan
A Vue	Ah ゔ Illustration	Joshua Mosley	2004	USA
Amore Asimmetrico	Asymmetrical Love	Ursula Ferrara	1990	Italia
Appunti Per Un Esserci (Studio Secondo)	Notes for Being There (Second Study)	Monica Petracci	2006	Italia
Arquivo	File	Sandro Aguilar	2007	Portugal
Attraverso	Through	Daniela Perego	2007	Italia
Blood Of A Poet		Lech Majewski	2006	Poland
Bou		Satoru Ono	2006	Japan
Brain Ash		Tomoharu Suzuki	2006	Japan
Ceremony		Maria Arena	2007	Italia
Children Of Shadows		Naoyuki Tsuji	2006	Japan
Cinque Stanze	Five Rooms	Ursula Ferrara	1999	Italia
Come Persone	Like People	Ursula Ferrara	1995	Italia
Compilation 12 Instants D'Amour Non Partagé	Compilation 12 Moments of Unrelated Love	Frank Beauvais	2007	France
Confutatis		Luca Zoppi	2007	Italia
Congiuntivo Futuro	Future Subjunctive	Ursula Ferrara	1988	Italia
Corpus Tracks		Audrey Coïaniz, Saul Saguatti	2007	Italia
Crackers		David Austen	2007	Great Britain
Das Ruinas A Rexistencia	Of the Ruins to Resistance	Carlos Adriano	2007	Brazil
Day Of Nose		Atsushi Wada	2006	Japan
Descent		Uriel Orlow	2006	Great Britain
Despues De La Revolucion	After the Revolution	Vincent Dieutre	2007	France
Despues Del Mar	After the Sea	Israel Adrián Caetano	2005	Argentina
Face To Face		Mika Seike	2007	Japan
Finally		Knut Åsdam	2006	Norway
From Locarno With Love		Gaëlle Vidalie	2007	France
Garibaldi Vs Che Guevara		Maia Guarnaccia	2007	Italia
Guacho		Juan Minujín	2007	Argentina
Il Grande Sogno Di Un Nano	The Great Dream of a Dwarf	Matteo Basilé, Franco Losvizzero	2006	Italia
Il Terrorista, Lui Guarda	The Terrorist, he Looks at	Simone Covini	2007	Italia
In In		Yoshno Saito	2006	Japan
Inch-High Samurai		Nobuhiro Aihara, Keiichi Tanaami	2007	Japan
Infero	Hell	Cristiano Carloni, Stefano Franceschetti	2007	Italia
Johnny 316		Erick Ifergan	2006	USA
King Of The Forest Cycle		Tatiana Arzamasova, Lev Evzovich, Vladimir Fridkes, Evgeny Svyatsky, AES+F	2006	Russia
L'Agnosie Visuelle	Visual Agnosia	Guillaume Meigneux	2007	France
L'Uomo Che Non C'È Non C'È Che L'Uomo	The Man Who is not There is Only the Man	Guendalina Salini	2007	Italia
La Fin Du Monde	The End of the World	Benjamin Nuel	2007	France
La Partita	The Game	Ursula Ferrara	2002	Italia
Le Voyage En Italie	The Trip to Italy	Arnold Pasquier	2007	France
Les Terra'S Di Nadie	Les Terra's Di Nobody	César Meneghetti	2007	Italia
Loudly Death Untied		Nicholas & Sheila Pye	2007	Canada
Lucidi Folli	Crazy Lucid	Ursula Ferrara	1986	Italia
Luna Zero		Antonello Matarazzo	2007	Italia
Metamorphosis		Clare Langan	2007	Ireland
Modell	Model	Pierre Reimer	2006	France
My New Picture		Bertrand Bonello	2006	France
News		Ursula Ferrara	2006	Italia
Not Guilty For Abel		Gaëlle Vidalie	2007	France
Outono	Autumn	Pablo Lobato	2007	Brazil
Padri	Fathers	Luca Attilii, Fabio Massimo Iaquone	2007	Italia
Pavillon Noir	Black Pavilion	Pierre Coulibeuf	2006	France
Polistirene	Polystyrene	Anna Franceschini	2007	Italia
Quasi Niente	Almost Nothing	Ursula Ferrara	1997	Italia
Sanctus	Spirit	Leonardo Carrano, Silvio Giorcelli	2007	Italia
Seascape #1 Night, China Shenzhen 05			2006	Italia
Sevilla -≫ (Oo) 06	Sevilla - & Gt; (and) 06		2006	Italia
Stolen Moments		Yasmine Chatila	2007	USA
Strange Culture		Lynn Hershman Leeson	2007	USA
Suzie No Name		Toru Morofuji	2006	Japan
The Half Hitching Post		Yang Fudong	2005	China
The Last Man In Brooklyn		Roberto Bentivegna	2006	USA
The Woman Who Saw Herself Disappear		Alice Anderson	2006	Great Britain
Toc Toc Wunderbar	TOC TOC Wonderful	Masbedo	2007	Italia
Trecho	Stretch	Clarissa Campolina, Helvécio Marins Jr	2006	Brazil
Tribulation		Christian Barbe	2007	Great Britain
Télépattes	Telepatops	Vivian Ostrovsky	2007	USA
Un Jour,	A Day,	Séverine Hubard	2007	France
Under Construction		Zhenchen Liu	2007	France
Unlith		Mihai Grecu	2007	France
Vb61 Still Death! Darfur Still Deaf?		Vanessa Beecroft	2007	USA
Versus_		Pasquale Napolitano	2006	Italia
Viril	Virile	Damien Manivel	2007	France
Visités	Visited	Clément Cogitore	2007	France
Vosges		Frank Beauvais	2006	France
Walperloh		Markus Bertuch	2006	Germany
Well, That'S Glasses		Atsushi Wada	2007	Japan
Weltanschauung	Worldview	Salvo Cuccia	2006	Italia
Wie Heisst Dieser Platz?	What is the Name of this Place?	Victor Alimpiev	2006	Austria
Zoo		Richard Billingham	2006	Great Britain

=== Award Screenings ===
==== Excellence Award ====
Original Title	English Title	Director(s)	Year	Production Country
La Comunidad	The Community	Alex de la Iglesia	2000	Spain

==== Raimondo Rezzonico Prize ====
Raimondo Rezzonico Prize To the Best Independent Manufacturer
Original Title	English Title	Director(s)	Year	Production Country
La ciénaga	The Swamp	Lucrecia Martel	2001	Argentina

=== Various ===
Various (Divers)

Original Title	English Title	Director(s)	Production Country
La Révolution Du Cinéma	The Film Revolution	Matteo Maccarinelli	Switzerland
Locarno 60		Stefano Knuchel, Cristina Trezzini	Switzerland

== Independent Sections ==
=== Critics Week ===
The Semaine de la Critique is an independent section, created in 1990 by the Swiss Association of Film Journalists in partnership with the Locarno Film Festival.

Original Title	English Title	Director(s)	Production Country
Allein In Vier Waenden	Alone in Four Things	Alexandra Westmeier	Germany
El Paraíso De Hafner	Hafner's Paradise	Günter Schwaiger	Austria
La Reina Del Condón	The Queen of the Condom	Silvana Ceschi, Reto Stamm	Switzerland
Los Ladrones Viejos	The Old Thieves	Everardo González	Mexico
Lynch		blackANDwhite	USA
One Minute to Nine		Tommy Davis	USA
Zu Fuss Nach Santiago De Compostela	On Foot to Santiago De Compostela	Bruno Moll	Switzerland

=== Swiss ===
Swiss Cinema Rediscovered
Original Title	English Title	Director(s)	Year	Production Country
Der Schuss Von Der Kanzel	The Shot from the Pulpit	Leopold Lindtberg	1942	Switzerland
Lugano			1927	Switzerland
Swiss Tour-Suzanne Et Son Marin	Swiss Tour-Suzanne and Her Sailor	Leopold Lindtberg	1949	Switzerland, USA
Switzerland Off The Beaten Track			1919	Switzerland
The Suspension Railway Of The Wetterhorn				Switzerland

=== Appellation Swiss ===
Original Title	English Title	Director(s)	Year	Production Country
Breakout		Mike Eschmann	2006	Switzerland
Bruno Manser - Laki Penan	Bruno MANSER - Penan	Christoph Kuehn	2007	Switzerland
Comme Des Voleurs (À L'Est)	Like Thieves (East)	Lionel Baier	2006	Switzerland
Ein Lied Für Argyris	A Song for Argyris	Stefan Haupt	2006	Switzerland
I Was a Swiss Banker		Thomas Imbach	2007	Switzerland
Marmorera	Marble	Markus Fischer	2007	Switzerland
Retour À Gorée	Back to Gorée	Pierre-Yves Borgeaud	2006	Switzerland
Sieben Mulden Und Eine Leiche	Seven Hollows and a Body	Thomas Haemmerli	2007	Switzerland
Someone Beside You		Edgar Hagen	2006	Switzerland
Wir Werden Uns Wiederseh'N	We will See Each Other	Stefan Hillebrand, Oliver Paulus	2006	Switzerland

== Official Awards ==
=== International Competition ===
- Golden Leopard: The Rebirth directed by Masahiro Kobayashi
- Daniel Schmid Prize: The Rebirth directed by Masahiro Kobayashi
- Special Mention, International Competition: Boys Of Tomorrow directed by Sang-yoon Cho
- Leopard for Best Actress: Marian Álvarez in The Best of Me
- Leopard for Best Actor: Michel Piccoli in Sous Les Toits De Paris, Michele Venitucci in Fuori Dalle Corde
- Best Director: Philippe Ramos for CAPITAINE ACHAB
- Special Jury Prize: Memories (Jeonju Digital Project 2007) directed by Eugène Green, Pedro Costa, and Harun Farocki

=== Jury Filmmakers of the Present ===
- C.P. Company Golden Leopard/Filmmakers of the Present Competition: Tejút directed by Benedek Fliegauf
- CinéCinéma Special Jury Prize, Filmmakers of the Present Competition: Imatra directed by Corso Salani
- Special Mention, Filmmakers of the Present Competition: Tussenstand directed by Mijke de Jong

=== Best First Film ===
- Leopard for Best First Feature: Tagliare Le Parti In Grigio directed by Vittorio Rifranti

=== Jury Leopards of Tomorrow ===
- Golden Leopard, Holcim Prize, Swiss Competition, Leopards of Tomorrow: René directed by Tobias Nölle
- Silver Leopard, Eastman Kodak Company Prize, Swiss Competition, Leopards of Tomorrow: Latitude 2023 directed by Florence Guillermin
- "Action Light Prize" for the Best Swiss Newcomer: Icebergs directed by Germinal Roaux
- Golden Leopard, SRG SSR idée Suisse, International Leopards of Tomorrow Competition: Valuri directed by Adrian Sitaru
- Silver Leopard, Eastman Kodak Company Prize International Leopards of Tomorrow Competition: Bende Sira (Ich Bin Dran) directed by Ismet Erguen
- Film and Video Subtitling Prize: Il Neige À Marrakech directed by Hicham Alhayat

=== Piazza Grande ===
- Prix du Public UBS: Death at a Funeral directed by Frank Oz

=== Youth Jury ===
- First Prize, Youth Jury: Slipstream directed by Anthony Hopkins
- Second Prize, Youth Jury Prize: Freigesprochen directed by Peter Payer
- Third Prize, Youth Jury: La Maison Jaune directed by Arnor Hakkar
- "The environnement is the quality of life" Prize: HAÏTI CHÉRIE directed by Claudio Del Punta
- Special Mention, Youth Jury: The Rebirth directed by Masahiro Kobayashi, Sous Les Toits De Paris directed by Huner Saleem

=== Ecumenical Jury ===
- Oecumenical Jury Prize: La Maison Jaune directed by Arnor Hakkar

=== FIPRESCI Jury ===
- FIPRESCI Prize: Capitaine Achab directed by Philippe Ramos

=== Jury CICAE – Prix Art & Essai ===
- Special Mention, CICAE Jury: The Rebirth directed by Masahiro Kobayashi, Las Vidas Posibles directed by Sandra Gugliotta
- CICAE Prize: Ladrones directed by Jaime Marques

=== Jury NETPAC (Network for the Promotion of Asian Cinema) ===
- NETPAC Prize: Little Moth directed by Tao Peng, An She directed by Naghi Nemati

=== Jury FICC ===
- FICC/IFFS Prize: La Maison Jaune directed by Arnor Hakkar

=== SRG SSR idée suisse | Semaine de la critique Prize ===
- Critics Week: Allein In Vier Waenden directed by Alexandra Westmeier

=== "Cinema e Gioventù" – Leopards of Tomorrow Jury ===
- For the Best Short Film, Youth Jury, International Competition, Leopards of Tomorrow (Short Films): Hoy No Estoy directed by Gustavo Taretto
- For the Best Short Film, Youth Jury, Swiss Competition, Leopards of Tomorrow (Short Films): MÉNAGERIE INTÉRIEURE directed by Nadège De Benoit-Luthy
- Special Mention, Youth Jury, International Competition, Leopards of Tomorrow (Short Films): Braedrabylta directed by Grimur Hakonarson
