= 59th Locarno Film Festival =

Film festival in Locarno, Switzerland

- Opening film: Miami Vice directed by Michael Mann
- Closing film: Little Miss Sunshine directed by Jonathan Dayton and Valerie Faris
- Location: Locarno, Switzerland
- Founded: 1946
- Awards: Golden Leopard: Das Fräulein directed by Andrea Staka
- Artistic director: Frederic Marie
- Festival date: Opening: 2 August 2006; Closing: 12 August 2006
- Website: LFF

Locarno Film Festival
- 60th 58th

The 59th Locarno Film Festival was held from 2 to 12 August 2006 in Locarno, Switzerland. The festival featured 172 films in total, with twenty one films in competition from seventeen different countries. The opening film was the European premiere of Miami Vice directed by Michael Mann. The closing film was the European premiere of Little Miss Sunshine directed by Jonathan Dayton and Valerie Faris. The festival also held a retrospective of the work of Finnish director Aki Kaursimaki.

The Leopard of Honor was awarded to director Alexsander Sokurov for his career in cinema. William Dafoe attended the festival to receive the excellence award.

This was the first year with Frederic Marie as the new artistic director. On the last day Marie passed out while introducing the Little Miss Sunshine screening and ended the festival in the hospital, reportedly due to exhaustion. There was also a problem with jury when, on the final day, one juror, Barbara Albert, revealed they were a co-writer of a film in competition, Das Fräulein, which went on to win the Golden Leopard. Albert resigned from the jury and didn't take part in the vote.

The Golden Leopard, the festival's top prize, was awarded to Das Fräulein directed by Andrea Staka.

== Official Jury ==
There was a five-person jury who voted on the films in competition. There was originally seven on the jury, but two people resigned.

- Emmanuelle Devos, French Actress, Resigned
- Barbara Albert, writer, Resigned

== Sections ==
The following films were screened in these sections:

=== Piazza Grande ===
| English Title | Original Title | Director(s) | Year | Production Country |
|---|---|---|---|---|
| 10 Insects To Feed | | Masbedo | 2006 | Italia |
| The Lives of Others | Das Leben Der Anderen | Florian Henckel von Donnersmarck | 2006 | Germany |
| Late Bloomers | Die Herbstzeitlosen | Bettina Oberli | 2006 | Switzerland |
| Dead in 3 Days | In Drei Tagen Bist Du Tot | Andreas Prochaska | 2006 | Austria |
| Days of Glory | Indigènes | Rachid Bouchareb | 2006 | France, Morocco, Algérie, Belgium |
| Jeu | | Georges Schwizgebel | 2006 | Switzerland, Canada |
| The Orchestra of Piazza Vittorio | L'Orchestra Di Piazza Vittorio | Agostino Ferrente | 2006 | Italia |
| Carla's Liste | La Liste De Carla | Marcel Schüpbach | 2006 | Switzerland |
| The Right of the Weakest | La Raison Du Plus Faible | Lucas Belvaux | 2006 | France, Belgium |
| Lights in the Dusk | Laitakaupungin Valot | Aki Kaurismäki | 2006 | Finland, Germany, France |
| Little Miss Sunshine | | Jonathan Dayton and Valerie Faris | 2006 | USA |
| Miami Vice | | Michael Mann | 2006 | USA |
| My Brother Is Getting Married | Mon Frère Se Marie | Jean-Stéphane Bron | 2006 | Switzerland, France |
| Neil Young: Heart of Gold | | Jonathan Demme | 2006 | USA |
| Nomad | | Sergei Bodrov, Ivan Passer | 2006 | Kazakhstan |
| Quale Amore | | Maurizio Sciarra | 2006 | Italia, Switzerland |
| Rachel (Short) | | Frédéric Mermoud | 2006 | France, Switzerland |
| Russian Ark | Russkij Kovcheg | Alexander Sokurov | 2002 | Germany, Russia |
| Severance | | Christopher Smith | 2006 | Great Britain, Hungary |
| Crossing Borders | Un Franco, 14 Pesetas | Carlos Jglesias | 2006 | Spain |

=== International Competition ===
Highlighted title indicates Golden Leopard winner

| Original Title | English Title | Director(s) | Year | Production Country |
|---|---|---|---|---|
| Agua | | Verónica Chen | 2006 | Argentina, France |
| Black Eyed Dog | | Pierre Gang | 2006 | Canada |
| Body Rice | | Hugo Vieira da Silva | 2006 | Portugal |
| Chahar Shanbeh Souri | | Asghar Farhadi | 2006 | Iran |
| Das Fräulein | | Andrea Štaka | 2006 | Switzerland, Germany |
| Der Mann Von Der Botschaft | The Man from the Message | Dimitri Tsintsadze | 2006 | Germany |
| Dies D'Agost | August Days | Marc Recha | 2006 | Spain |
| El Benny | | Jorge Luis Sánchez | 2006 | Cuba, Spain, Great Britain |
| Fu Sheng | | Zhimin Sheng | 2006 | China |
| Gefangene | Prisoner | Iain Dilthey | 2006 | Germany, Austria |
| Half Nelson | | Ryan Fleck | 2005 | USA |
| Hirtia Va Fi Albastra | The Paper will be Blue | Radu Muntean | 2006 | Romania |
| Jimmy Della Collina | Jimmy of the Hill | Enrico Pau | 2006 | Italia |
| Le Dernier Des Fous | The Last of the Madmen | Laurent Achard | 2006 | France, Belgium |
| Mare Nero | Black Sea | Roberta Torre | 2006 | Italia, France |
| Mnogotochie | Multitude | Andrei A. Eshpai | 2006 | Russia |
| Nae-Chungchun-Aegae-Goham | | Young-Nam Kim | 2006 | South Korea, Japan |
| Stephanie Daley | | Hilary Brougher | 2006 | USA |
| Suzanne | | Viviane Candas | 2006 | France |
| The Lives Of The Saints | | Chris Cottam, Rankin | 2006 | Great Britain |
| Ça Rend Heureux | It Makes you Happy | Joachim Lafosse | 2006 | Belgium, Italia |

=== Filmmakers of the Present ===
The Concorso Cineasti del Presente, also known as the Filmmakers of the Present Competition, showcases first and second feature films from emerging filmmakers.

Filmmakers of the Present - In Competition

Highlighted title indicates Filmmakers of the Present winner

| Original Title | English Title | Director(s) | Year | Production Country |
|---|---|---|---|---|
| About Love | | Darezhan Omirbaev | 2006 | South Korea |
| Acidente | Accident | Cao Guimarães, Pablo Lobato | 2006 | Brazil |
| Car Wash | | Pascal Rambert | 2005 | France |
| Chand Kilo Khorma Baraye Marassem-E Tadfin | The Kingdom of the Kingdom Birth Khort Birth Birth Birth Birthday | Saman Salour | 2006 | Iran |
| Drifting Paradise | | Chun-Hsiung Wang | 2006 | Thailand |
| Fragments Sur La Grâce | Fragments on Grace | Vincent Dieutre | 2006 | France, Belgium |
| Germanium No Yoru | The Night of the Gelloma | Tatsushi Ōmori | 2005 | Japan |
| Kilnieks | | Laila Pakalnina | 2006 | Latvia, Estonia, Slovenia |
| Kythera | | Péter Mészáros | 2006 | Hungary |
| L'Année Suivante | The Following Year | Isabelle Czajka | 2006 | France |
| L'Étrangère | Foreigner | Florence Colombani | 2006 | France, Portugal |
| La Silla | The Chair | Julio D. Wallovits | 2005 | Spain |
| La Vraie Vie Est Ailleurs | Real Life is Elsewhere | Frédéric Choffat | 2006 | Switzerland |
| Le Dernier Homme | The Last Man | Ghassan Salhab | 2006 | France, Lebanon |
| Les Mains D'Andréa | Andréa's Hands | Sébastien Betbeder | 2006 | France |
| Love Story | | Kelvin Tong | 2006 | Singapour, Hong Kong |
| No Day Off | | Eric Khoo | 2006 | South Korea |
| Rabia | | Oscar Cardenas | 2006 | Chile |
| Schopenhauer | | | 2006 | Italia |
| So Lange Du Hier Bist | As Long as you are Here | Stefan Westerwelle | 2006 | Germany |
| Sotto La Stessa Luna | Under the Same Moon | Carlo Luglio | 2005 | Italia |
| Street Thief | | Malik Bader | 2006 | USA |
| Tarachime | | Naomi Kawase | 2006 | Japan, France |
| The Giant Buddhas | | Christian Frei | 2005 | Switzerland |
| Twelve Twenty | | Pen-ek Ratanaruang | 2006 | South Korea |
| Verfolgt | Hounded | Angelina Maccarone | 2006 | Germany |
| Who is Haoran | | Yishu Yang | 2006 | China |
| Wild Tigers I Have Known | | Cam Archer | 2005 | USA |

Filmmakers of the Present - Out of Competition

| Original Title | English Title | Director(s) | Year | Production Country |
|---|---|---|---|---|
| Camicie Verdi | Green Shirts | Claudio Lazzaro | 2006 | Italia |
| Celui Qui Aime A Raison | The One Who Loves is Right | Arnold Pasquier | 2005 | France |
| Don Chisciotte E... | Don Quixote and ... | Bruno Bigoni | 2006 | Italia |
| Début | Beginning | Pascal Rambert | 2006 | France |
| Feltrinelli | | Alessandro Rossetto | 2006 | Italia, Switzerland, Germany |
| Habana - Arte Nuevo De Hacer Ruinas | Havana - New Art of Making Ruins | Florian Borchmeyer, Matthias Hentschler | 2006 | Germany |
| Il Faut Aimer Son Prochain, Les Autres Sont Trop Loin | You Have to Love your Neighbor, the Others are Too Far | Arnold Pasquier | 2006 | France |
| Il Était Une Fois... Les Délices Du Petit Monde | Once Upon a Time ... the Delights of the Little World | Joseph Péaquin | 2006 | Italia |
| Jour Après Jour | Day after Day | Jean-Paul Fargier | 2006 | France |
| La Consultation | Consultation | Hélène De Crécy | 2006 | France |
| La Traductrice | The Translator | Elena Hazanov | 2006 | Switzerland, Russia |
| Las Camas Solas | The Beds Alone | Sandra Gomez | 2006 | Switzerland |
| Les Signes | Signs | Eugène Green | 2006 | France |
| No Body Is Perfect | | Raphael Sibilla | 2005 | France |
| Quand Nous Étions Punk | When We Were Punk | Pascal Rambert | 2005 | France |
| Qué Viva Mauricio Demierre | What Does Mauricio Demierre Live | Stéphane Goël | 2006 | Switzerland |
| Rule Of Law - Justiz Im Kosovo | Rule of Law - Justice in Kosovo | Susanne Brandstätter | 2006 | Austria |
| The Bimo Records | | Rui Yang | 2006 | China |
| Toyen | | Jan Němec | 2005 | Czech Republic |
| Tv Junkie | | Michael Cain, Matt Radecki | 2005 | USA |
| Tête D'Or | Head of Gold | Gilles Blanchard | 2006 | France |

=== Open Doors ===
Open Doors - South East Asia

| Original Title | English Title | Director(s) | Year | Production Country |
|---|---|---|---|---|
| 0.1875 | | Tan Royston | 2006 | Singapour |
| A Tree in Tanjung Malim | | Tan Chui Mui | 2005 | Malaysia |
| Be with Me | | Eric Khoo | 2005 | Singapour |
| Beautiful Boxer | | Ekachai Uekrongtham | 2003 | Thailand |
| Blissfully Yours | | Apichatpong Weerasethakul | 2002 | Thailand, France |
| Company of Mushrooms | | Tan Chui Mui | 2006 | Malaysia |
| Eliana, Eliana | | Riri Riza | 2001 | Indonesia |
| Letter to an Angel | | Garin Nugroho | 1993 | Indonesia |
| Monday Morning Glory | | Ming jin Woo | 2005 | Malaysia |
| One Night Husband | | Pimpaka Towira | 2003 | Thailand |
| Perth | | Djinn | 2004 | Singapour |
| Princess of Mount Ledang | | Teong Hin Saw | 2004 | Malaysia |
| South of South | | Tan Chui Mui | 2006 | Malaysia |
| Tears of the Black Tiger | | Wisit Sasanatieng | 2000 | Thailand |
| The Beautiful Washing Machine | | James Lee | 2004 | Malaysia, South Korea |
| The Rainmaker | | Ravi Bharwani | 2004 | Indonesia |
| Whispering Sands | | Nan Triveni Achnas | 2001 | Indonesia, Japan |

=== Leopards of Tomorrow ===
Leopards of Tomorrow (Pardi di Domani)

==== Eastern Mediterranean Competition ====
Eastern Mediterranean Competition - Leopards of Tomorrow
| Original Title | English Title | Director(s) | Year | Production Country |
|---|---|---|---|---|
| After Shave | | Hany Tamba | 2004 | France, Lebanon |
| Amor Fati | Love Fati | Dennis Todorovic | 2005 | Germany, Serbia and Montenegro |
| Be Quiet | | Sameh Zoabi | 2005 | France |
| Bir Damla Su | A Drop of Water | Deniz Gamze Ergüven | 2006 | France |
| Bubachki | | Igor Ivanov | 2003 | Macedonia |
| Crickets | | Matan Guggenheim | 2004 | Israel |
| De Quelle Couleur Sont Les Murs De Votre Appartement? | What Color are the Walls of your Apartment? | Timon Koulmasis | 2005 | France |
| Defteri Fisi | Book Fisi | Vardis Marinakis | 2005 | Greece |
| Die Rasur - Tras | The Shave - Tras | Tunçay Kulaoglu, Martina Priessner | 2006 | Germany |
| Get The Rabbit Back | | Kamen Kalev, Dimitar Mitovski | 2005 | Bulgaria |
| Hayelet Bodeda | | Talya Lavie | 2005 | Israel |
| Kvish | Kavish | Nadav Lapid | 2004 | Israel |
| Layla Afel | | Leon Prudovsky | 2005 | Israel |
| Ochi Pia Istories Agapi | No more Stories of Love | Stratoula Theodoratou | 2003 | Greece |
| Offside | | Guy Nattiv, Erez Tadmor | 2006 | Israel |
| Ohcet | | Petar Pasic | 2005 | Slovenia |
| Poyraz | | Belma Bas | 2006 | Turkey |
| Quelques Miettes Pour Les Oiseaux | Some Crumbs for Birds | Nassim Amaouche | 2005 | France, Giordania |
| Ram Za Sliku Moje Domovine | Ram for a Picture of My Homeland | Elmir Jukić | 2005 | Bosnia and Herzegovina, Slovenia |
| Sharar | The Waste | Hazim Bitar, Saleh Kasem, Ammar Quttaineh | 2006 | Giordania |
| Tir | | Radoy Nikolov | 2005 | Bulgaria |
| Toz | Dust | Fatih Kizilgok | 2005 | Turkey |
| Ulicni Hodac | Hodac Street | Kosta Djordjevic | 2004 | Serbia and Montenegro |
| Vaskeriet | The Laundry | Hisham al-Zouki | 2006 | Norway, Syria |
| West Bank Story | | Ari Sandel | 2005 | USA |
| Yasmine Tughani | | Najwa Najjar | 2006 | Palestine |
| Ça Sera Beau - From Beyrouth With Love | It will be Beautiful - From Beirut with Love | Wael Nourredine | 2005 | France, Lebanon |
| Çarpışma | | Umut Aral | 2005 | Turkey |
Retrospective of the Eastern Mediterranean
| (A)Torzija | (a) Torsion | Stefan Arsenijević | 2002 | Slovenia |
| Aadan | Adan | Ruba Nadda | 2004 | Canada |
| Ax | | Kazim Öz | 1999 | Turkey |
| Babami Hirsizlar Caldi | Babami Hireless Caldied | Esen Isik | 1999 | Switzerland |
| Balkanska Ruleta | Balkan Roulette | Zdravko Barisic | 1998 | Slovenia |
| Berlinbeirut | | Myrna Maakaron Behnke | 2004 | Germany |
| Bezi Zeko Bezi | Bey | Pavle Vuckovic | 2003 | Serbia and Montenegro |
| Cyber Palestine | | Elia Suleiman | 2000 | USA, Palestine |
| Dayım | | Tayfun Pirselimoglu | 1999 | Turkey |
| Dremano Oko | Dreman's Eye | Vladimir Perišić | 2003 | France |
| Ela Na Sou Po | She at I'm Po | Katerina Filiotou | 2000 | Greece |
| Getürkt | Tortured | Fatih Akin | 1997 | Germany |
| Haravyi | Haravy | Yannis Katsamboulas | 2003 | Greece |
| Hop, Skip & Jump | | Srđan Vuletić | 2000 | Slovenia, Bosnia and Herzegovina |
| How Beautiful Is The Sea | | Sabine El Chamaa | 2003 | Lebanon |
| Krav Tarnegolim | Claim Tarnegolim | Sigalit Liphshiz | 2000 | Israel |
| La Danse Éternelle | Eternal Dance | Hiam Abbass | 2003 | France |
| Like Twenty Impossibles | | Annemarie Jacir | 2003 | Palestine |
| Lulu | | Keren Yedaya | 2001 | France |
| Mabrouk Again! | | Hany Tamba | 1999 | France, Lebanon |
| Milhama A'Heret | | Nadav Gal | 2003 | Israel |
| Naprijed, Nazad | Forward, Back | Jasmila Žbanić | 2002 | Bosnia and Herzegovina |
| O Gogos | Gogos | Panayotis Fafoutis | 2001 | Greece |
| Ochley Lechem Hesed | Ochley Lech Hessed | Hiam Tabakman | 2002 | Israel |
| Oneg Shabath | One Shabath | Mihal Brezis, Oded Binnun | 2003 | Israel |
| Poetot Odmara | The Poet Odma | Mitko Panov | 1998 | Switzerland, Macedonia |
| Prvo Smrtno Iskutvo | The First Deaths | Aida Begić | 2001 | Bosnia and Herzegovina, Italia |
| Racconto Di Guerra | War Story | Mario Amura | 2003 | Italia |
| Raddem | | Danielle Arbid | 1998 | France, Lebanon |
| Srce Je Kos Mesa | The Heart is the Hair of the Meat | Jan Cvitkovič | 2003 | Slovenia |
| Strangers | | Guy Nattiv, Erez Tadmor | 2004 | Israel, USA |
| Taxi Service | | Elie Khalifé, Alexandre Monnier | 1996 | Switzerland, Lebanon |
| To Foustani | The Dress | Monica Vaxevani | 2001 | Greece |
| Yawmiyat Ahir | T | Tawfik Abu Wael | 2001 | Palestine |
| Zadnja Zelja | The Last Cabbage | Petar Pasic | 2003 | Slovenia |

==== Swiss Competition ====
Swiss Competition – Leopards of Tomorrow (Pardi di Domani)
| Original Title | English Title | Director(s) | Year | Production Country |
|---|---|---|---|---|
| Amancay | | Milagros Mumenthaler | 2006 | Switzerland, Argentina |
| Aschenbrüder | | Markus Heiniger, Steve Walker | 2006 | Switzerland |
| Beckenrand | Pelvic Edge | Michael Koch | 2006 | Switzerland, Germany |
| Coupé Court | Short -Cut | Hugo Veludo | 2006 | Switzerland |
| Eclipse | | Léo Maillard | 2006 | Switzerland |
| Federer Et Moi | Federer and Me | Robin Harsch | 2006 | Switzerland |
| Jolido | | Francesco Jost | 2006 | Switzerland |
| Jules-Aimé Péclard, Distillateur D'Esprit De Clocher | Jules-Aimé Péclard, Bell Tower Spirit Distiller | Grégoire Mayor | 2006 | Switzerland |
| La Vérité Vraie | The True Truth | Tania Zambrano Ovalle | 2006 | Switzerland |
| Les Pieds De La Baleine | Whale's Feet | Cédric Juniet | 2005 | Switzerland |
| Männer Am Meer | Men by the Sea | Reto Caffi | 2005 | Germany, Switzerland |
| Nachtflattern | Night -Flutter | Carmen Stadler | 2006 | Switzerland |
| Nouvel Ordre | New Order | Grégory Bindschedler, Ausonio De Sousa, Jean-Daniel Schneider | 2006 | Switzerland |
| The Yellow Wallpaper | | Andrea Oki | 2006 | Switzerland |
| Verset, Refrain, Verset | Engineers, Refrain, Engage | Bogdan Nunweiller | 2005 | Switzerland |
| Virgin Red | | Edouard Getaz | 2005 | USA, Switzerland |
| Waning Moon | | Luca Colombo | 2006 | USA, Switzerland |

=== Tribute To ===
Tribute To Juan Pablo Rebella
| Original Title | English Title | Director(s) | Year | Production Country |
|---|---|---|---|---|
| Whisky | | Juan Pablo Rebella, Pablo Stoll | 2004 | Uruguay, Argentina, Germany |
Tribute To Pio Bordoni
| Come Fate A Vedere Le Rondini... | How Do you See the Swallows ... | Zijad Ibrahimovic | 2006 | Switzerland |

=== Retrospective – Aki Kaurismäki ===
Retrospective Aki Kaurismäki
| Original Title | English Title | Director(s) | Year | Production Country |
|---|---|---|---|---|
| A Matter Of Life And Death | | Michael Powell, Emeric Pressburger | 1946 | Great Britain |
| Akahige | Red Beard | Akira Kurosawa | 1965 | Japan |
| Angst Essen Seele Auf | Ali: Fear Eats the Soul | Rainer Werner Fassbinder | 1974 | Germany |
| Angèle | | Marcel Pagnol | 1934 | France |
| Ariel | | Aki Kaurismäki | 1988 | Finland |
| Au hasard Balthazar | Balthazar | Robert Bresson | 1966 | France |
| Bab El-Hadid | Cairo Station | Youssef Chahine | 1958 | Egypt |
| Bico (Segment Visions Of Europe) | | Aki Kaurismäki | 2004 | Finland |
| Bitter Victory | | Nicholas Ray | 1957 | France, USA |
| Broken Blossoms or the Yellow Man and the Girl | | D. W. Griffith | 1919 | USA |
| Bronenosets Potyomkin | Battleship Potemkin | Sergei Eisenstein | 1925 | Russia |
| Calamari Union | | Aki Kaurismäki | 1985 | Finland |
| Casque D'Or | Gold Helmet | Jacques Becker | 1952 | France |
| Cinéma, De Notre Temps: Aki Kaurismäki | Cinema, of Our Time: Aki Kaurismäki | Guy Girard | 2001 | France, Finland |
| Dogs Have No Hell (Épisode Ten Minutes Older - The Trumpet) | | Aki Kaurismäki | 2001 | Germany |
| Hamlet Liikemaailmassa | Hamlet in the Business World | Aki Kaurismäki | 1987 | Finland |
| I Hired a Contract Killer | | Aki Kaurismäki | 1990 | Finland, Sweden |
| Iron Horsemen | | Gilles Charmant | 1994 | Finland, France, Italia |
| Juha | | Aki Kaurismäki | 1999 | Finland, Germany, France |
| Kaurismäki & Kaurismäki | Kaurismäki & Kaurismäki | Alexander Bohr | 1994 | Germany |
| La Vie De Bohème | Bohemian's Life | Aki Kaurismäki | 1992 | Finland, France, Sweden, Germany |
| Las Hurdes | The Hurdes | Luis Buñuel | 1933 | Spain |
| Last Holiday | | Henry Cass | 1950 | Great Britain |
| Le Tango Venu Du Froid | Tango from Cold | Gilles Charmant, Benoît Finck | 2000 | France |
| Leningrad Cowboys Go America | | Aki Kaurismäki | 1989 | Finland, Sweden |
| Leningrad Cowboys Meet Moses | | Aki Kaurismäki | 1994 | Finland, Germany, France |
| Mies Vailla Menneisyyttä | A Man without the Past | Aki Kaurismäki | 2002 | Finland, Germany, France |
| Night on Earth | | Jim Jarmusch | 1991 | France, England, Germany, USA, Japan |
| Pidä Huivista Kiinni, Tatjana | Hold the Scarf, Tatyana | Aki Kaurismäki | 1994 | Finland, Germany |
| Rich Little Bitch | | Aki Kaurismäki | 1987 | Finland |
| Rikos Ja Rangaistus | Crime and Punishment | Aki Kaurismäki | 1983 | Finland |
| Rocky VI | | Aki Kaurismäki | 1986 | Finland |
| Rosetta | | Luc et Jean-Pierre Dardenne | 1999 | Belgium, France |
| Stranger Than Paradise | | Jim Jarmusch | 1982 | USA, Germany |
| Sunrise - A Song of Two Humans | | F. W. Murnau | 1927 | USA |
| The Cameraman | | Edward Sedgwick | 1928 | USA |
| The Fatal Glass of Beer | | Clyde Bruckman | 1933 | USA |
| The Set-Up | | Robert Wise | 1949 | USA |
| These Boots | | Aki Kaurismäki | 1992 | Finland |
| Those Were the Days | | Aki Kaurismäki | 1991 | Finland |
| Thru the Wire | | Aki Kaurismäki | 1987 | Finland |
| Tokyo Monogatari | Tokyo Story | Yasujirō Ozu | 1953 | Japan |
| Total Balalaika Show - Helsinki Concert | Total Balalaika Show | Aki Kaurismäki | 1994 | Finland |
| Tulitikkutehtaan Tyttö | The Girl of the Matchmaker | Aki Kaurismäki | 1990 | Finland, Sweden |
| Umberto D. | | Vittorio De Sica | 1952 | Italia |
| Valehtelija | The Liar | Mika Kaurismäki | 1981 | Finland |
| Varjoja Paratiisissä | Shadows in Paradise | Aki Kaurismäki | 1986 | Finland |
| Written on the Wind | | Douglas Sirk | 1956 | USA |
| Zéro De Conduite | Driving Zero | Jamie Vico | 1933 | France |
| Ça Rend Heureux | It Makes you Happy | Aki Kaurismäki | 1996 | Finland, Germany, France |

=== 20 Years of Catalan Films ===
| Original Title | English Title | Director(s) | Year | Production Country |
|---|---|---|---|---|
| Bitter Kas | | Edu Grau | 2004 | Spain |
| El Cerco | The Fence | Nacho Martín | 2005 | Spain |
| El Taxista Ful | The Taxiist Ful | Jo Sol | 2005 | Spain |
| La Casa De Mi Abuela | My Grandmother's House | Adan Aliaga | 2005 | Spain |
| La Leyenda Del Tiempo | The Legend of Time | Isaki Lacuesta | 2006 | Spain |
| Remake | | Roger Gual | 2005 | Spain, Argentina |

=== About Cinema ===
| Original Title | English Title | Director(s) | Year | Production Country |
|---|---|---|---|---|
| Cinéma, De Notre Temps: Le Home Cinéma Des Frères Dardenne | Cinema, Our Time: The Home Cinema of the Dardenne Brothers | Jean-Pierre Limosin | 2006 | France |
| Conversazione A Porto. Manoel De Oliveira E Agustina Bessa-Luis. Dicembre 2005 | Conversazione to Porto. Manoel De Oliveira and Agustina Bessa-Luis. DICEMBRE 2005 | Daniele Segre | 2006 | Italia |
| Figner, The End Of A Silent Century | | Nathalie Alonso Casale | 2006 | Netherlands, France, Great Britain, Russia |
| I'Ll Be Your Eyes, You'Ll Be Mine | | Stephen Dwoskin, Keja Ho Kramer | 2006 | France |
| Il Peggio Di Noi | The Worst of Us | Corso Salani | 2006 | Italia |
| Il Tempo Si È Fermato. Il Cinediario | Time Stopped. the Cinendiario | Réalisation collective | 1958 | Italia |
| Il Tempo Si È Fermato | Time Stopped | Ermanno Olmi | 1959 | Italia |
| Komadori Eiga Komaneko | Robin Movie Komacat | Tsuneo Gōda | 2006 | Japan |
| L'Homme Des Flandres | The Man of Flanders | Sébastien Ors | 2006 | France |
| La Petite Dame Du Capitole | The Little Lady of the Capitol | Jacqueline Veuve | 2005 | Switzerland |
| Person | | Marina Person | 2006 | Brazil |
| Riviera Cocktail | | Heinz Bütler | 2006 | Switzerland, Netherlands, Finland |
| This Film Is Not Yet Rated | | Kirby Dick | 2006 | USA |
| Vocation Cinéaste | Filmmaker | Laurent Perrin | 2006 | France |

=== Digital Asia ===
| Original Title | English Title | Director(s) | Year | Production Country |
|---|---|---|---|---|
| A Conversation With God | | Tsai Ming-liang | 2001 | South Korea |
| A Letter From Hiroshima | | Nobuhiro Suwa | 2002 | South Korea |
| Daf | | Bahman Ghobadi | 2003 | South Korea |
| Dance With Me To The End Of Love | | Lik Wai Yu | 2004 | South Korea |
| Digital Search | | PARK Ki-yong | 2003 | South Korea |
| Digitopia | | John Akomfrah | 2001 | South Korea |
| Haze | | Shinya Tsukamoto | 2005 | South Korea |
| In Public | | Jia Zhangke | 2001 | South Korea |
| Influenza | | Bong Joon Ho | 2004 | South Korea |
| Like A Desperado Under The Eaves | | Shinji Aoyama | 2003 | South Korea |
| Magician(S) | | Il-gon SONG | 2005 | South Korea |
| Mirrored Mind | | Sogo Ishii | 2004 | South Korea |
| Miss Jin Xing Story | | Yuan Zhang | 2000 | South Korea |
| Survival Game | | Seong-wook Moon | 2002 | South Korea |
| The Name Of The Night | | Yun-tae Kim | 2000 | South Korea |
| The New Year | | Xiaoshuai WANG | 2001 | South Korea |
| Worldly Desires | | Apichatpong Weerasethakul | 2005 | South Korea |
| Www.Whitelover.Com | | Kwang-su PARK | 2000 | South Korea |

=== Juries' Films ===
| Original Title | English Title | Director(s) | Year | Production Country |
|---|---|---|---|---|
| Downtown 81 | | Edo Bertoglio | 1981 | USA |
| Fantasma | Ghost | Lisandro Alonso | 2006 | Argentina, Netherlands, France |
| July Rhapsody | | Ann Hui | 2001 | Hong Kong |
| La Libertad | Freedom | Lisandro Alonso | 2001 | Argentina |
| Los Muertos | | Lisandro Alonso | 2004 | Argentina, France, Netherlands, Switzerland |
| M/Other | | Nobuhiro Suwa | 1999 | Japan |
| Mechilot | | Udi Aloni | 2006 | Israel |
| Nordrand | Northern Skirts | Barbara Albert | 1999 | Austria, Germany, Switzerland |
| Odete | Two Drifters | João Pedro Rodrigues | 2005 | Portugal |
| Odgrobadogroba | Gravehopping | Jan Cvitkovič | 2005 | Croatia, Slovenia |
| Pianese Nunzio, 14 Anni A Maggio | Pianese Nunzio, 14 Years in May | Antonio Capuano | 1996 | Italia |
| Rollow | | Emmanuelle Laure Antille | 2005 | Switzerland |
| Sur Mes Levres | On My Lips | Jacques Audiard | 2001 | France |
| Zemestan | Earthest | Rafi Pitts | 2006 | Iran |

=== Midnight Movies ===
| Original Title | English Title | Director(s) | Year | Production Country |
|---|---|---|---|---|
| Mcdull, The Alumni | | Samson Chiu | 2006 | Hong Kong, China |
| Sa Saeng Gyul Dan | | Choi Ho | 2006 | South Korea |
| Shadow of the Vampire | | E. Elias Merhige | 2000 | Great Britain, USA, Luxembourg |

=== Leopard of Honor ===
| Original Title | English Title | Director(s) | Production Country |
|---|---|---|---|
| Eleghia Zhizni. Rostropovich. Vishnevskaya | Elegy of Life. Rostropovich. Vishnevskaya | Alexander Sokurov | Russia |

=== Play Forward ===
| Original Title | English Title | Director(s) | Year | Production Country |
|---|---|---|---|---|
| A Life Of Errors | | Nicholas & Sheila Pye | 2006 | Canada |
| A Little Musical Day | | Julien Roby | 2006 | France |
| Airport Dreams | | Luis Ortega | 2006 | Argentina |
| Alias | | Aldo Runfola | 2004 | Switzerland |
| Bianca, 16 Anni | Bianca, 16 Years Old | Oliviero Toscani | 2006 | Italia |
| Blissed | | Knut Asdam | 2006 | Norway, Switzerland, Belgium, France, Great Britain |
| Both Members Of This Club | | Ofri Cnaani | 2002 | USA |
| Cantico Das Criaturas | Cantum of Creatures | Miguel Gomes | 2006 | Portugal |
| Chinese Crackers | | Jonathan Monk | 2006 | China, Great Britain |
| Desalento | Discouragement | Mauro Santini | 2006 | Italia |
| Destricted | | Marina Abramovic, Matthew Barney, Larry Clark, Gaspar Noé | 2006 | USA, Great Britain |
| Devour | | Carolee Schneemann | 2005 | USA |
| Donnerstag | Thursday | Frédéric Moser, Philippe Schwinger | 2006 | Germany |
| Dove Il Marmo È Zucchero | Where Marble is Sugar | Elisabetta Sgarbi | 2006 | Italia |
| Fly From The Dead | | Paul Durango | 2006 | France |
| For Your Eyes | | Jeanne Susplugas | 2005 | France |
| Fu Ge | F UG E | CUI Zi'en | 2005 | China |
| Gretchen | | Steve Collins | 2006 | USA |
| Il Mondo Non È Un Panorama | The World is not a Panorama | Masbedo | 2006 | Italia |
| Kelly | | L.A. Raeven | 2006 | USA, Netherlands |
| L'Homme De Paille | The Man of Straw | Nicolas Giraud | 2006 | France |
| L'Immature | | Adrian Smith | 2006 | France |
| La Camera | The Camera | Ra Di Martino | 2006 | Italia, USA |
| Le Soleil Et La Mort Voyagent Ensemble | The Sun and Death Travel Together | Frank Beauvais | 2006 | France |
| Lock Again | | Yang Fudong | 2004 | China |
| Loneliness And The Modern Pentathlon | | Daria Martin | 2005 | Switzerland, Great Britain |
| Majimak Babsang | | Gyeong-Tae Roh | 2006 | South Korea |
| Malye Azerki | Small Azerki | Dmitri Makhomet | 2006 | France |
| Mary Sue | | Mary Sue | 2006 | France |
| Mon Ami, Tout Va À La Décharge | My Friend, Everything Goes to the Discharge | Yvonne Kerouèdan | 2006 | France |
| Morning Lemon | | Daan Spruijt | 2006 | France |
| Movements | | | 2000 | Germany |
| Neige, Ma Grimace | Snow, My Grimace | Antoine Fumat | 2006 | France |
| Null | | Arturo Fuentes | 2006 | Spain |
| Octobre | October | Pierre Léon | 2005 | France |
| Olympics | | Shannon Plumb | 2005 | USA |
| Once Upon A Time | | Corinna Schnitt | 2005 | Germany, USA |
| Postcard To A Ballerina | | Eva Koch | 2004 | Denmark |
| Quartet | | Ofri Cnaani | 2005 | USA |
| Secret Strikes | | Alicia Framis | 2006 | Spain, Netherlands, France, Great Britain |
| Silencio | Silence | Sérgio Borges | 2005 | Brazil |
| Site Specific_Las Vegas 05 | | Olivo Barbieri | 2006 | USA, Canada, Italia |
| Site Specific_Roma 04 | | Olivo Barbieri | 2004 | Italia |
| Site Specific_Shanghai 04 | | Olivo Barbieri | 2005 | China, Italia |
| Sleepers | | Johanna Domke | 2006 | Germany |
| Spring | | Lina Bertucci | 2006 | USA |
| Ten In Love | | Markus Schinwald | 2006 | Austria, Belgium, France |
| Teresa | | Ana Maria Gomes | 2006 | France |
| Time Flies | | Frédéric Moser, Philippe Schwinger | 2006 | Germany |
| Tokyo Loop | | Koji Yamamura (and other 15 filimaker) | 2006 | Japan |
| Travelling As 4 Gares | | Joel Pizzini | 2006 | Brazil |
| Untitled | | Lamya Gargash | 2006 | United Arab Emirates |
| Untitled | | Nicholas & Sheila Pye | 2005 | Canada |
| Who'S Marina Abramovic ? | | Pierre Coulibeuf | 2006 | France |
| Who'S Meg Stuart? | | Pierre Coulibeuf | 2006 | France |
| Who'S Michelangelo Pistoletto? | | Pierre Coulibeuf | 2006 | France |
| Windows | | Shoja Azari | 2006 | USA |
| Zoo | | Salla Tykkä | 2006 | Finland |

== Independent Sections ==
=== Critics Week ===
The Semaine de la Critique is an independent section, created in 1990 by the Swiss Association of Film Journalists in partnership with the Locarno Film Festival.

| Original Title | English Title | Director(s) | Year | Production Country |
|---|---|---|---|---|
| Az Èlet Vendége | The Guest of the Èlet | Tibor Szemzö | 2006 | Hungary |
| Das Erbe Der Bergler - Alpine Saga | The Legacy of the Bergler - Alpine Saga | Erich Langjahr | 2006 | Switzerland |
| Eggesin Moeglicherweise | Eggesin may Have | Dirk Heth, Olaf Winkler | 2005 | Germany |
| Hardcore Chambermusic | | Peter Liechti | 2006 | Switzerland |
| Red White Black & Blue | | Tom Putnam | 2006 | USA |
| Three Comrades | | Masha Novikova | 2006 | Netherlands |
| Zeit Des Abschieds | Time of Farewell | Mehdi Sahebi | 2006 | Switzerland |

=== Swiss Films ===
Swiss Cinema Center
| Original Title | English Title | Director(s) | Year | Production Country |
|---|---|---|---|---|
| Augen Blicke N | Eyes Look n | Gitta Gsell | | Switzerland |
| Brother Yusef | | Nicolas Humbert, Werner Penzel | | Switzerland |
| Building The Gherkin | | Mirjam von Arx | | Switzerland |
| Carnets De Valse | Waltzer's Notebooks | Patricia Plattner | | Switzerland |
| Citywalls - My Own Private Tehran | | Afsar Sonia Shafie | | Switzerland |
| Donde Està Sara Gomes? | DONDE is Sara Gomes? | Alessandra Mueller | | Switzerland |
| Grounding | | Tobias Fueter, Michael Steiner | | Switzerland |
| Gérald Metroz, Elle Est Pas Belle La Vie? | Gérald Metroz, Isn't Life Beautiful? | Jean-François Amiguet | | Switzerland |
| Hedy Lamarr - Secrets Of A Hollywood Star | | Donatello Dubini, Fosco Dubini, Barbara Obermaier | | Switzerland |
| Irène Schweizer | | Gitta Gsell | | Switzerland |
| Josh'S Trees | | Peter Entell | | Switzerland |
| Kusskuss | Couscous | Sören Senn | | Switzerland |
| L'Assassinat De Felix Moumié | The Assassination of Felix Moumié | Frank Garbely | | Switzerland |
| La Mémoire Des Autres | The Memory of Others | Pilar Anguita-Mackay | | Switzerland |
| La Nébuleuse Du Coeur | The Nebula of the Heart | Jacqueline Veuve | | Switzerland |
| Le Souffle Du Désert | The Breath of the Desert | François Kohler | | Switzerland |
| Les Hommes Du Tunnel | Tunnel Men | Marcel Schüpbach | | Switzerland |
| Les Regles Du Jeu | The Rules of the Game | Nicolas J. Peart, Pierre Morath | 2005 | Switzerland |
| Matchmaker | | Gabrielle Antonsiewicz | | Switzerland |
| Mein Name Ist Eugen | My Name is Eugen | Michael Steiner | | Switzerland |
| Näkkäla | | Peter Ramseier | 2005 | Switzerland |
| Ryna | | Ruxandra Zenide | | Switzerland |
| Stages | | Marek Beles | | Switzerland |
| The Headsman | | Simon Aeby | | Switzerland |
| Undercover | | Sabine Boss | | Switzerland |
| Unser America | Our America | Kristina Konrad | | Switzerland |
| Voler Est Un Art | Flying is an Art | Pierre-André Thiébaud | | Switzerland |
| Wer War Kafka | Who Was Kafka | Richard Dindo | | Switzerland |
| Wrong Number | | Lewis Husler | | Switzerland |
Cinema Rediscovered
| Alpine Grandeur | Alpine Size | E.M. Newman | 1937 | USA |
| Matto Regiert | Matto Rules | Leopold Lindtberg | 1947 | Switzerland |
| Steibruch | Broken | Sigfrit Steiner | 1942 | Switzerland |

==== Appellation Swiss ====
| Original Title | English Title | Director(s) | Year | Production Country |
|---|---|---|---|---|
| Exit, Le Droit De Mourir | Exit, the Right to Die | Fernand Melgar | 2005 | Switzerland |
| Fragile | | Laurent Nègre | 2005 | Switzerland |
| Grounding - Die Letzten Tage Der Swissair | Grounding - The Last Days of Swissair | Tobias Fueter, Michael Steiner | 2006 | Switzerland |
| Hippie Masala - Für Immer In Indien | Hippie Masala - Forever in India | Urlich Grossenbacher | 2006 | Switzerland |
| Jeune Homme | Young Man | | 2006 | Switzerland |
| Lenz | | Thomas Imbach | 2006 | Switzerland, Germany |
| Nachbeben | Nominate | Stina Werenfels | 2005 | Switzerland |
| The Short Life of José Antonio Gutierrez | | Heidi Specogna | 2006 | Germany, Switzerland |
| Vitus | | Fredi M. Murer | 2006 | Switzerland, France |
| Zum Abschied Mozart | To Say Goodbye Mozart | Christian Labhart | 2006 | Switzerland |

== Official Awards ==
=== International Competition ===
- Golden Leopard: Das Fräulein directed by Andrea Štaka
- Special Jury Prize: Half Nelson directed by Ryan Fleck
- Leopard for Best Actress: Amber Tamblyn in Stephanie Daley
- Leopard for Best Actor: Burghart Klaussner in Der Mann Von Der Botschaft
- Best Direction Prize: Laurent Achard for LE DERNIER DES FOUS
- Special Mention, Film and Video Subtitling Prize, Gerhard Lehmann AG: Defteri Fisi directed by Vardis Marinakis

=== Jury Filmmakers of the Present Competition ===
- Golden Leopard Filmmakers of the Present C.P. Company: Verfolgt directed by Angelina Maccarone
- CinéCinéma Special Jury Prize, Filmmakers of the Present Competition: Chand Kilo Khorma Baraye Marassem-E Tadfin directed by Saman Salour
- Filmmakers of the Present Competition – Special Mention: Tarachime directed by Naomi Kawase

=== Jury Leopards of Tomorrow ===
- Golden Leopard, SRG SSR idée Suisse, Swiss Competition: Nachtflattern directed by Carmen Stalder
- Silver Leopard, Eastman Kodak Company Prize, Swiss Competition: Aschenbrüder directed by Steve Walker and Markus Heiniger
- "Action Light" Prize for the Best Newcomer – Swiss Competition: La Vérité Vraie directed by Tania Zambrano Ovalle
- Golden Leopard, SRG SSR idée Suisse, East of the Mediterranean: Bubachki directed by Igor Ivanov
- Silver Leopard, Kodak Leopards of Tomorrow Prize: West Bank Story directed by Ari Sandel
- Film and Video Subtitling Prize, Gerhard Lehmann AG: Bir Damla Su directed by Deniz Gamze Ergüven
- Special Mention, Leopards of Tomorrow, Swiss Competition: Nouvel Ordre directed by Ausonio De Sousa, Grégory Bindschedler and Jean-Daniel Schneider

=== "Cinema e Gioventù" – Leopards of Tomorrow Jury ===
- Youth Jury Prize, Leopards of Tomorrow-(Short Films): Aschenbrüder directed by Steve Walker and Markus Heiniger
- Special Mention, Youth Jury, Short Films: Ram Za Sliku Moje Domovine directed by Elmir Jukić

=== Jury for the Best first feature ===
- Leopard for Best First Feature: L'Année Suivante directed by Isabelle Czajka
- Special Mention for Best First Feature: So Lange Du Hier Bist directed by Stefan Westerwelle

=== Piazza Grande ===
- Prix du Public UBS: The Lives of Others directed by Florian Henckel von Donnersmarck

=== Youth Jury ===
- First Prize, Youth Jury: Das Fräulein directed by Andrea Štaka
- Second Prize, Youth Jury Prize: Chahar Shanbeh Souri directed by Asghar Farhadi
- "The environnement is the quality of life" Prize: Agua directed by Verónica Chen
- Special Mention, Youth Jury Prize: Half Nelson directed by Ryan Fleck, Mnogotochie directed by Andrei A. Eshpal

=== Ecumenical Jury ===
- Oecumenical Jury Prize: Agua directed by Verónica Chen
- Special Mention, Oecumenical Jury: Le Dernier Des Fous directed by Laurent Achard

=== FIPRESCI Jury ===
- FIPRESCI Prize: Nae-Chungchun-Aegae-Goham directed by Young-Nam Kim

=== Jury CICAE – Prix Art & Essai ===
- Special Mention, CICAE Prize: Mnogotochie directed by Andrei A. Eshpai, Das Fräulein directed by Andrea Štaka
- CICAE Prix Art & Essai: Jimmy Della Collina directed by Enrico Pau

=== NETPAC (Network for the Promotion of Asian Cinema) Jury ===
- NETPAC Prize: Nae-Chungchun-Aegae-Goham directed by Young-Nam Kim, Fu Sheng directed by Zhimin Sheng

=== FICC Jury ===
- Don Quijote Prize: Das Fräulein directed by Andrea Štaka

=== SRG SSR idée suisse | Semaine de la critique Prize ===
- SRG SSR idée Suisse Prize/Critics Week: Zeit Des Abschieds directed by Mehdi Sahebi
- Special Mention, Critic Week Jury: Az ÈLet Vendége directed by Tibor Szemzö
