= 38th Locarno Film Festival =

Film festival in Locarno, Switzerland

- Opening film: When Father Was Away on Business directed by Emir Kusturica
- Location: Locarno, Switzerland
- Founded: 1946
- Awards: Golden Leopard: Alpine Fire directed by Fredi M. Murer
- Artistic director: David Strieff
- Festival date: Opening: 8 August 1985; Closing: 18 August 1985
- Website: LFF

Locarno Film Festival
- 39th 37th

The 38th Locarno Film Festival was held from 8 to 18 August 1985 in Locarno, Switzerland. The opening film was the Cannes Palme D'or winner When Father Was Away on Business directed by Emir Kusturica. It was shown in the Piazza Grande, the 5,000 seat open-air theater, along with films such as The Official Story and Desperately Seeking Susan, which drew the largest festival crowd of over 5,000 people. The festival also screened all 16 hours of the German film Heimat directed by Edgar Reitz.

It was a record year for Locarno with the highest levels of attendance in its history, over 50,000 people, and a budget of around $600,000. Most of the money came from the local and state government. The only non-state sponsor was the Swiss Bank Union. In response to this growth, the Locarno festival organization expressed a desire to build a new 950-seat theater for future festivals. Artistic director David Strieff also wanted to add one day to the festival in order to re-screen all the winning films, as the festival did this year.

The TV competition also grew with 17 television films in competition, another 77 in an information section, and 23 countries represented. Two additional screening rooms were needed, along with the original three, to accommodate the audience.

One noteworthy attendee was guest of honor Elisabeth Kopp, the first woman to serve in the Swiss Federal Council the executive governing body of Switzerland.

The Golden Leopard, the festival's top prize, was awarded to Alpine Fire directed by Fredi M. Murer. The film also won the Ecumenical award for best film, but Murer rejected that award saying that the ecumenical jury didn't understand the movie.

== Official Sections ==
The following films were screened in these sections:

=== Main Competition ===
==== Feature films ====
Feature Films In Competition / Main Program
Original Title	English Title	Director(s)	Year	Production Country
Desert Hearts		Donna Deitch	1985	USA
Dongdong De Jiaqi	A Summer at Grandpa's	Hou Hsiao-Hsien	1984	Taiwan
Elsa, Elsa		Didier Haudepin	1985	France
Fast Talking		Ken Cameron	1984	Australia
Fetish & Dreams		Steff Gruber	1985	Switzerland
Himatsuri	Fire Festival	Mitsuo Yanagamachi	1984	Japan
Huang Tudi	Yellow Earth	Chen Kaige	1984	China
Höhenfeuer	Alpine Fire	Fredi M. Murer	1985	Switzerland
Inganni		Luigi Faccini	1985	Italia
La Sonata A Kreutzer	The Kreutzer Sonanta	Gabriella Rosaleva	1985	Italia
Le Medecin De Gafire	The Doctor from Gafire	Mustapha Diop	1984	Niger
Liebe Und Tod	Love and Death	Nanna Rélia	1985	Germany
Mukhamukham		Adoor Gopalakrishnan	1984	India
Signal 7		Rob Nilsson	1984	USA
Sladkii Sok Vnuti Travi	Sweet Juice of the Grass	Amanbek Alpiev, Serguei Bodrov	1985	Russia
Tagediebe		Marcel Gisler	1985	Germany
The Way It Is		Eric Mitchell	1984	USA

==== Television Movies ====
Television Movies In Competition
Original Title	English Title	Director(s)	Year	Production Country
Contact		Alan Clarke	1985	Great Britain
Cztery Pory Roku	Four Seasons	Andrzej Kondratiuk	1985	Poland
Die Abschiebung	The Deportation	Marianne Lüdcke	1985	Germany
Do You Remember Love		Jeff Bleckner	1985	USA
Finnegan Begin Again		Joan Micklin Silver	1984	Great Britain
Forbidden		Anthony Page	1985	USA
Gentle Sinners		Eric Till	1985	Canada
Go Tell It On The Mountain		Stan Lathan	1985	USA
Kids Don'T Tell		Sam O'Steel	1985	USA
La Città Di Miriam	The City of Miriam	Aldo Lado	1983	Italia
Malkiyat Sodom	Little Sodom	Dimitar Avramov	1985	Bulgaria
Meurtres Pour Memoire	Memory Murders	Laurent Heynemann	1985	France
Queen Of The Road		Bruce Best	1985	Australia
Summer Lghtning		Paul Joyce	1985	Iceland
Testament		Lynne Littman	1984	USA
The Joy That Kills		Tina Rathborne	1985	USA

=== Out of Competition (Fuori Concorso) ===
Out of Competition — Main Program / Feature Films
Original Title	English Title	Director(s)	Year	Production Country
A Test Of Love		Gil Brealey	1985	Australia
Desperately Seeking Susan		Susan Seidelman	1985	USA
Gyakufunsha-Kazouku	Reverse Injection is Floating	Sogo Ishii	1984	Japan
Heimat	Hometown	Edgar Reitz	1984	Germany
Hurlevent	Howl	Jacques Rivette	1985	France
Il Giocatore Invisibile	The Invisible Player	Sergio Genni	1985	Switzerland
La Historia Oficial	The Official History	Licia Punzo	1984	Argentina
Les Enfants	Children	Marguerite Duras, Jean Marc Turin	1984	France
Mask		Peter Bogdanovich	1985	USA
Maya Miriga		Nirad N. Mohapatra	1984	India
Mishima		Paul Schrader	1985	USA
Moj Otac Na Sluzbenom Putu	My Father on the Official Path	Emir Kusturica	1985	Yugoslavia
My First Wife		Paul Cox	1984	Australia
Notre Mariage	Our Marriage	Valeria Sarmiento	1984	France
Redl Ezredes	Colonel Redl	Istvan Szabo	1985	Hungary, Austria
Segreti Segreti	Secret Secrets	Giuseppe Bertolucci	1985	Italia
Wetherby		David Hare	1985	Great Britain

=== Special Sections ===
==== Out-of-Program ====
Out-of-Program Films
Original title	English title	Director(s)	Year	Production country
Biancheng	BI Ancheng	Ling Zifeng		China
Die Büchse Der Pandora	The Pandora's Box	Georg Wilhelm Pabst	1929	Germany
El Pueblo Nunca Muere	The People Never Die	Mathias Knauer		Switzerland
L'Ecole Du Flamenco	The Flamenco School	Walter Marti, Reni Mertens		Switzerland
Schlangenzauber	Snake Magic	Isa Hesse-Rabinovitch		Switzerland
Trains Speciaux	Special Trains	Krsto Papic		Yugoslavia

==== Special Program ====
Special Program
Original title	English title	Director(s)	Year	Production country
Borderline		Kenneth Macpherson	1930	Switzerland
De Tijd	Time	Johan van der van der Keuken	1984	Netherlands
Diles Que No Me Maten	Tell Them not to Kill Me	Freddy Siso	1984	Venezuela
Gregorio		Fernando Espinosa, Stefan Kaspar	1984	Peru
Han Ye	Han Y'E	Que Wen	1984	China
Kaiser Und Eine Nacht	Emperor and One Night	Markus Fischer	1985	Germany, Switzerland
Laska V Pasazi	Laska in the Passage	Jaroslav Soukup	1984	Czech Republic
Le Thé au harem d'Archimède	Tea in the Harem	Mehdi Charef	1985	France
Lily In Love		Karoly Makk	1985	USA
Mister Mirror		Franco Cavani	1985	Switzerland
Pier Paolo		Matteo Emery	1985	Switzerland
The Time Of Harvey Milk		Robert Epstein, Richard Schmiechen	1984	USA
Tokyo Melody		Elisabeth Lennard	1984	France
Tokyo-Ga		Wim Wenders	1985	Germany
Vakantie Van De Filmer	Holiday from the Filmmaker	Johan van der van der Keuken	1974	Netherlands

==== Carte Blanche to Umberto Eco ====
Carte Blanche Selections from Umberto Eco
Original Title	English Title	Director(s)	Year	Production Country
Bad Day At Black Bock		John Sturges	1954	USA
Paisà	Countryman	Roberto Rossellini	1946	Italia
Stagecoach		John Ford	1939	USA
The Invasion Of The Body Snatchers		Don Siegel	1956	USA
Way Out West		James W. Home	1937	USA
Yankee Doodle Dandy		Michael Curtiz	1942	USA
You Can'T Take It With You		Frank Capra	1938	USA

==== Retrospective - Boris Barnet ====
Retrospective Boris Barnet (1902-1965) - Boris Barnet Actor
Original title	English title	Director(s)	Year	Production Country
Chakhmatnaïa Goriatchka	Chakhmatnaïa Goriachka	Vsevolod Poudovkine	1925	Russia
Neobytchaïnye Priklutcheniya Mistera Westa V Strnye Bolschevikov		Lev Kouléchov	1924	Russia
Retrospective Boris Barnet (1902-1965) - Boris Barnet Director
Alienka		Boris Barnet	1962	Russia
Annouchka		Boris Barnet	1959	Russia
Borietz I Klooun	Boripet the Clown	Boris Barnet	1957	Russia
Dievouchka S Korobkoï	DIEVOCHKA S Korobkoï	Boris Barnet	1927	Russia
Dom Na Troubnoï	House on the Troubno	Boris Barnet	1928	Russia
I Podvig Razv Edtchika	And a Feat in the Edcechika	Boris Barnet	1947	Russia
Miss Mend		Boris Barnet	1926	Russia
Okraïna	Zokraïna	Boris Barnet	1933	Russia
Ou Samovo Sinevo Moria	Silence Has a Blue Sea	Boris Barnet	1936	Russia
Poet		Boris Barnet	1957	Russia
Poloustanok	Pelustanok	Boris Barnet	1963	Russia
Starii Naezdnik	Old Rider	Boris Barnet	1959	Russia

==== Tribute To Cinecittà ====
Tribute To Cinecittà from 1935-1985
Original title	English title	Director(s)	Year	Production country
Cleopatra		Joseph L. Mankiewicz	1961	USA
I Promessi Sposi		Mario Camerini	1941	Italia
Il Casanova Di Federico Fellini	Federico Fellini's Casanova	Federico Fellini	1976	Italia

==== Yugoslavian National Cinema Week ====
Yugoslavia National Week
Original title	English title	Director(s)	Year	Production country
Covek Nije Tica	Covek is not a Tick	Dusan Makavejev	1964	Yugoslavia
Davitel Y Protiv Davitelja	Davitel Y Against the Donor	Slobodan Sijan	1984	Yugoslavia
Drouga Generacija	The Second Generation	Zelimir Zilnik	1983	Yugoslavia
Nesto Izmedu	Something Between	Srdan Karanovic	1982	Yugoslavia
Rdeci Boogie Ali Kaj Ti Je Deklica	Red Boogie or What is your Girlfriend	Karpo Acimovic-Godina	1982	Yugoslavia
Samo Jednom Se Ljubi	Only Once Kisses you	Rajko Grlic	1981	Yugoslavia
Sjecas Li Se Dolly Bell	Do you Remember Dolly Bell	Emir Kusturica	1981	Yugoslavia
Slike Iz Zivota Udarnika	Images from the Life of the Striker	Bahrudin Cengic	1972	Yugoslavia
Zaseda	Ambush	Zivojin Pavlovic	1969	Yugoslavia

== Parallel Sections ==
=== Film Critics Week ===
FIPRESCI - International Federation of Film Critics Week
Original Title	English Title	Director(s)	Year	Production Country
Lieber Karl	Dear Karl	Maria Knilli	1984	Germany
Los Motivos De Berta	Berta's Reasons	José Luis Guerin	1983	Spain
Noah Und Der Cow-Boy	Noah and the Cow-Boy	Hansueli Schenkel, Felix Tissi	1985	Switzerland
Orinoko - Nuevo Mundo	Orinoko - New World	Diego Risquez	1984	Venezuela
Qingmei Zhuma	Taipei Story	Edward Yang	1985	Taiwan
Szirmok, Viragok, Koszoruk	Petals, Virags, their Wreaths	Laszlo Lugossy	1984	Hungary
Windy City		Armyan Bernstein	1984	USA

=== Swiss Information ===
Swiss Information - Feature Films
Original title	English title	Director(s)	Year	Production country
After Darkness		Sergio Guerrez, Dominique Othenin-Girard	1985	Switzerland
Akropolis Now		Hans Liechti	1984	Switzerland
Der Ruf Der Sibylla	The Call of the Sibylla	Clemens Klopfenstein		Switzerland
Derborence		Francis Reusser	1985	Switzerland
Er Moretto: Von Liebe Leben	He Moretto: Live of Love	Simon Bischoff	1984	Switzerland
Freeze: Videoladen Z!Urich, 1976-1985 Dokumentation Einer Geschichte	Freeze: Video Show! Urich, 1976-1985 Documentation of a Story	René Baumann, Marcel Müller		Switzerland
Je Vous Salue Marie	I Greet you Marie	Jean-Luc Godard	1985	Switzerland
The Land Of William Tell			1984	Switzerland
Swiss Information - Short And Medium-Length Films
78 Tours		Georges Schwizgebel	1985	Switzerland
Aelia		Dominique De Rivaz	1985	Switzerland
Altmanns Regel	Altmann's Rule	Manuel Siebenmann, Benno Wenz	1984	Switzerland
Ave & Maria		Bianca Conti Rossini	1984	Switzerland
Cachemire	Cashmere	Eva Ceccaroli	1985	Switzerland
Futur Interieur	Anterior Future	Alain Nicolet	1985	Switzerland
La Quatrième Veille	The Fourth Watch	José Michel Buhler	1985	Switzerland
Le Livre De Marie	Marie's Book	Anne-Marie Miéville	1985	Switzerland
Lettre Mortelle	Mortal Letter	Pier Blattner	1985	Switzerland

== Official Awards ==
=== International Jury ===
- Golden Leopard: Alpine Fire directed by Fredi M. Murer
- Silver Leopard: Yellow Earth directed by Chen Kaige
- Bronze Leopard: Desert Hearts for actress Helen Shaver, Fire Festival for cinematographer Masaki Tamura
- Second Prize of the City of Locarno: Tagediebe (Day Thieves) directed by Marcel Gisler

=== FIPRESCI Critics Jury ===
- FIPRESCI Prize: Taipei Story directed by Edward Yang
- Special Mention: The Doctor from Gafire directed by Mustapha Diop

=== Ecumenical Jury ===
- Ecumenical Jury Prize: Alpine Fire directed by Fredi M. Murer
- Mention: Yellow Earth directed by Chen Kaige
- Mention: A Summer at Grandpa's directed by Hou Hsiao-Hsien
