= Fräulein (disambiguation) =

Fräulein is the German language honorific previously in common use for unmarried women, comparable to Miss in English.

Fräulein may also refer to:

- "Fraulein" (song), a 1957 song
- Fräulein (1958 film), a World War II film starring Dana Wynter and Mel Ferrer
- Das Fräulein, a 2006 film
