= Service Entrance =

Service Entrance may refer to:

- The Women on the 6th Floor, also known as Service Entrance, a 2010 French film
- Service Entrance (1954 film), a French comedy drama film
