= By Force =

- Theatrical release poster
- Spanish: A golpes
- Directed by: Juan Vicente Córdoba
- Screenplay by: Juan Vicente Córdoba; María Reyes Arias
- Produced by: Enrique Cerezo
- Starring: Natalia Verbeke; Daniel Guzmán; Juana Acosta; María Vázquez; Marian Álvarez; Zay Nuba
- Cinematography: Teo Delgado
- Edited by: Pablo Blanco
- Music by: Guateque All Stars
- Production company: Enrique Cerezo PC
- Distributed by: Sony Pictures
- Release date: 4 November 2005
- Country: Spain
- Language: Spanish

By Force (Spanish: A golpes) is a 2005 Spanish drama film directed by Juan Vicente Córdoba which stars Natalia Verbeke and Daniel Guzmán alongside Juana Acosta, María Vázquez, Marian Álvarez, and Zay Nuba.

== Plot ==
The plot tracks five boxing-practicing friends from Vallecas (María, Juanita, Vicky, Mena, and Nitzia) pushed by circumstances into a criminal career as ram-raiders.

== Cast ==
- Natalia Verbeke as María Gómez, "Coco"
- Daniel Guzmán as Fran
- María Vázquez as Vicky
- Juana Acosta as Juanita
- Marian Álvarez as Mena
- Zay Nuba as Nitzia
- María Reyes Arias as Lola
- Alfredo Villa as Mariano
- Carlos Kaniowsky as padre María
- Andrés Gertrúdix as Pipo
- Javier Pereira as patrulla
- Miguel Ángel Silvestre as Yuri

== Production ==
The film is an Enrique Cerezo PC and it had the participation of TVE and Canal+.

== Release ==
Distributed by Sony Pictures, the film was released theatrically in Spain on 4 November 2005.

== Reception ==
Jonathan Holland of Variety assessed that the film "starts out looking somewhat punch-drunk but sharpens considerably over the final rounds".

José Luis Sánchez Noriega determined that even if it is an "honest and willful work", By Force is a failed film as a cinematographic work.

== See also ==
- List of Spanish films of 2005
