= Un buen novio =

- Theatrical release poster
- Directed by: Jesús Delgado
- Screenplay by: Jesús Delgado
- Starring: Fernando Guillén-Cuervo; Natalia Verbeke; Adolfo Fernández; Pepo Oliva; Andrés Lima; Roman Luknár; William Holden; Ángela Castilla
- Cinematography: Teo Delgado
- Edited by: Pablo Blanco
- Music by: Mario de Benito
- Production companies: Cre-Acción Films; Adai Films; Plot Films
- Distributed by: Líder Films
- Release dates: July 1998 (L'Alfàs del Pi); 4 September 1998 (Spain)
- Country: Spain
- Language: Spanish

Un buen novio is a 1998 Spanish melodrama thriller film written and directed by Jesús Delgado which stars Fernando Guillén Cuervo, Natalia Verbeke, and Adolfo Fernández.

== Plot ==
Set in Madrid, the plot follows police inspector Alex Cano, who finds out his girlfriend Verónica is cheating on him with childhood friend Roberto while taking on a theft case.

== Cast ==
- Fernando Guillén-Cuervo as Alex
- Natalia Verbeke as Verónica
- Adolfo Fernández as Roberto
- Pepo Oliva as Rafa
- Andrés Lima as Esteban
- Roman Luknár
- William Holden
- Ángela Castilla as Marta
- Víctor Clavijo

== Production ==
The film was produced by Cre-Acción Films, Adai Films and Plot Films, and it had the collaboration of Sogepaq and funding from the Spanish Ministry of Culture. It was shot in Madrid.

== Release ==
The film screened at the 10th Alfàs del Pi Film Festival. It was released theatrically in Spain on 4 September 1998.

== Reception ==
Augusto Martínez Torres of El País deemed the film to be an "uneven" crime film, "but with an interesting triangular story inside".

== See also ==
- List of Spanish films of 1998
