= The Hostage (2006 film) =

2006 film directed by Laila Pakalnina

- Latvian: Ķīlnieks
- Estonian: Koer, lennuk ja laulupidu
- Directed by: Laila Pakalniņa
- Written by: Laila Pakalniņa
- Produced by: Arko Okk, Laila Pakalniņa, Igor Pediček
- Production companies: Acuba Film, Casablanca Film Production (Slovenia), Company Hargla (Latvia)
- Release date: 2006
- Countries: Estonia, Latvia
- Language: Latvian

The Hostage (Latvian: Ķīlnieks, Estonian: Koer, lennuk ja laulupidu) is a 2006 Latvian-Estonian comedy film directed by Laila Pakalniņa.

== Cast ==
- Branko Završan as Hijacker
- Kristaps Mednis as Tom
- Ieva Puķe as Mother
- Pauls Butkevics as Antons
- Ivars Brakovskis as Visvaldis
- Valdis Liepiņš as Detective
- Kaljo Kiisk as Old man
- Jaan Rekkor as Coach
- Jēkabs Nākums as Self
- Maija Apine
- Rūdolfs Plēpis
- Imants Strads

== Release ==
The Hostage was screened at the 2006 Warsaw International Film Festival in Poland.

== Awards ==
The film received the following awards:

- 2007: Kinoshock Open Film Festival for states of the CIS and Estonia, Latvia and Lithuania (Anapa, Russia), best operator work: Arko Okk
- 2007: The National Film Festival Lielais Kristaps (Latvia), best artist's work: Jurģis Krāsons; several nominations in other categories
