= The Truth and Other Lies =

- Theatrical release poster
- Spanish: El juego de la verdad
- Directed by: Álvaro Fernández Armero
- Screenplay by: Álvaro Fernández Armero; Roberto Santiago
- Produced by: Juan Gordon; Pau Calpe
- Starring: Tristán Ulloa; Natalia Verbeke; Óscar Jaenada; María Esteve
- Cinematography: Aitor Mantxola
- Edited by: David Pinillos
- Music by: Eduardo Arbide
- Production companies: Morena Films; DeAPlaneta; DePalacio
- Distributed by: Manga Films
- Release date: 24 September 2004
- Country: Spain
- Language: Spanish

The Truth and Other Lies (Spanish: El juego de la verdad) is a 2004 Spanish comedy film directed by Álvaro Fernández Armero which stars Tristán Ulloa, Natalia Verbeke, Óscar Jaenada and María Esteve.

== Plot ==
Upon being misdiagnosed with a terminal cancer, Ernesto proposes telling the truth to his girlfriend Lea and his friends Alberto and Susana, confessing that he wishes to bang Susana.

== Cast ==
- Óscar Jaenada as Alberto
- Natalia Verbeke as Susana
- Tristán Ulloa as Ernesto
- María Esteve as Lea

== Production ==
The film was produced by Morena Films, DeAPlaneta and DePalacio and it had the participation of Canal+, Antena 3, Telemadrid, TVC, TVV, TVG, EiTB, TV Canarias, and TV Castilla-La Mancha. Shooting locations included Buenos Aires, Argentina.

== Release ==
Distributed by Manga Films, it was released theatrically in Spain on 24 September 2004.

== Reception ==
Jonathan Holland of Variety deemed the film to be "an attractively unassuming if conventional couples comedy that starts slowly but later warms successfully to its task".

Mirito Torreiro of Fotogramas rated the film 3 out of 5 stars, highlighting the duo consisting of Verbeke and Esteve as the best thing about it while pointing out that the film takes time in finding the right tone.

== See also ==
- List of Spanish films of 2004
