= Full Moon (1998 film) =

1998 Swiss-German film

- German: Vollmond
- Directed by: Fredi M. Murer
- Screenplay by: Fredi M. Murer
- Produced by: Marcel Hoehn
- Starring: Hanspeter Müller-Drossaart; Chandra Götz; Sara Capretti; Soraya Sala; Max Rüdlinger; Michael Neuenschwander
- Cinematography: Pio Corradi
- Edited by: Loredana Cristelli
- Music by: Mario Beretta
- Release date: March 1998
- Running time: 156 minutes
- Countries: Switzerland; Germany; France
- Languages: Italian; French; Swiss German

Full Moon (German: Vollmond) is a 1998 Swiss-German-French film directed and written by Fredi M. Murer. It follows the disappearance of twelve children from different parts of Switzerland. The film shared the Grand Prix des Amériques at the 1998 Montreal World Film Festival and was nominated for Best Fiction Film at the 1999 Swiss Film Award.

== Synopsis ==
The day after a full moon, twelve ten-year-old children disappear across Switzerland’s four language regions. A week later, each set of parents receives the same cryptic letter from the children. The letter sets out demands that must be met before the next full moon.

== Cast ==
The cast includes:

- Hanspeter Müller as Anatol Wasser
- Lilo Baur as Irene Escher
- Benedict Freitag as Max Escher
- Mariebelle Kuhn as Emmi
- Joseph Scheidegger as Oskar Fürst

== Reception ==
=== Awards ===
The film shared the Grand Prix des Amériques at the 1998 Montreal World Film Festival. It was nominated for Best Fiction Film at the 1999 Swiss Film Award.

=== Critical response ===
Filmdienst described the film as a utopian parable about Swiss society and the state of the world at the end of the millennium, but said it was ultimately unconvincing because it was overloaded with characters and themes. According to Filmpodium, the film develops into a fantastical protest by the children against the adults’ lack of imagination and consideration, and shows strong elements of social satire.

== Festival screenings ==
The film premiered in March 1998. It was later screened at festivals including the Cairo International Film Festival in 1998, the Göteborg Film Festival and the San Francisco International Film Festival in 1999, the Moscow International Film Festival in 2001, the Fünf Seen Filmfestival in 2012, and the Zurich Film Festival in 2016.
