= The Best of Me (2007 film) =

- Theatrical release poster
- Spanish: Lo mejor de mí
- Directed by: Roser Aguilar
- Screenplay by: Roser Aguilar; Oriol Capel
- Starring: Marian Álvarez; Juan Sanz; Lluís Homar; Alberto Jiménez; Marieta Orozco; Carmen Machi; Pablo Derqui
- Cinematography: Isaac Vila
- Edited by: Bernat Vilaplana
- Music by: Jens Neumaier
- Production company: Escándalo Films
- Release dates: 10 August 2007 (Locarno); 7 March 2008 (Spain)
- Country: Spain
- Language: Spanish

The Best of Me (Spanish: Lo mejor de mí) is a 2007 Spanish drama film directed by Roser Aguilar (in her directorial debut feature) which stars Marian Álvarez.

== Plot ==
Deeply in love with athlete Tomás, journalist Raquel decides to sacrifice herself, offering as a liver donor upon her boyfriend's sudden fainting and ensuing diagnosis of a potentially deadly liver ailment.

== Cast ==
- Marian Álvarez as Raquel
- Juan Sanz as Tomás
- Lluís Homar as Eduardo
- Alberto Jiménez as Dr. Ferrer
- Marieta Orozco as Silvia
- Carmen Machi as Carmen
- Pablo Derqui as David
- Maife Gil as Pilar
- Pep Cortés as Ignácio

== Production ==
The film was produced by Escándalo Films, an initiative of the ESCAC film school. Shooting locations included the surroundings of Barcelona and the General Hospital of Sant Cugat del Vallès.

== Release ==
The film made it to the 60th Locarno Film Festival's main competition slate, vying for the Golden Leopard. It was released theatrically in Spain on 7 March 2008.

== Reception ==
Jay Weissberg of Variety deemed the film to be "a shoulder-shrugging liver transplant tale from freshman helmer Roser Aguilar that plays like a standard TV movie".

Javier Ocaña of El País deemed the film to be a "a disappointing, but by no means negligible, debut film", considering that "it starts bad", although in its second half, particularly upon the transplant, it is narrated in a "much more subtle and compelling" way.

Mirito Torreiro of Fotogramas rated the film 4 out of 5 stars, highlighting "the patience with which the plot is built" as the film's best.

== See also ==
- List of Spanish films of 2008
