= Marian Álvarez =

Spanish actress (born 1978)

- Álvarez in 2026
- Born: Marian Álvarez Cachero; 1 April 1978 (age 48); Madrid, Spain
- Other name: Marián Álvarez
- Occupation: Actress

Marian Álvarez Cachero (born 1 April 1978) is a Spanish actress. She has been typecast in suffering roles.

== Biography ==
Álvarez was born in Madrid on 1 April 1978. She studied business sciences while receiving formal training as an actress.

She landed her acting debut in 2000 with a guest role in television series El grupo. Following a short film debut in Soberano, el rey canalla, she made her feature film debut in Miguel Bardem's Swindled (2004). In her early career, she went on to feature in television series such as 7 vidas, La sopa boba, Motivos personales, Hospital Central and La fuga and films such as Semen, una historia de amor, By Force, The Best of Me, and Bestezuelas.

Álvarez's performance as a young woman with a borderline personality disorder in the 2013 drama film Wounded earned her a Silver Shell for Best Actress and a Goya Award for Best Actress.

== Filmography ==
=== Film ===
Year	Title	Role	Notes	Ref.
2004	Incautos (Swindled)		Feature film debut	
2005	A golpes (By Force)	Mena		
2007	Lo mejor de mí (The Best of Me)	Raquel		
2010	Bestezuelas	Perla		
2013	La herida (Wounded)	Ana		
2014	V/H/S: Viral	Marta	Segment "Parallel Monsters"	
2015	Felices 140 (Happy 140)	Cati		
2015	Lobos sucios	Manuela		
2016	Cien años de perdón (To Steal from a Thief)	Cristina		
2017	La niebla y la doncella (The Mist and the Maiden)	Carmen		
2017	Morir (Dying)	Marta		
2018	El cuaderno de Sara (Sara's Notebook)	Sara		
2018	Cuando los ángeles duermen (When Angels Sleep)	Sandra		
2019	Sordo (The Silent War)	Rosa Ribagorda		
2021	Ego	Mariajo		
2021	Érase una vez en Euskadi (Once Upon a Time in Euskadi)	Carmen		
2025	Mi amiga Eva (My Friend Eva)	Marga		
2025	Parecido a un asesinato (Hidden Murder)	Celia		
2026	Altas capacidades (Better Class)	Alicia		

=== Television ===
Year	Title	Role	Notes	Ref.
2015	Teresa	Santa Teresa	TV movie	
2020–23	La unidad	Miriam		
2024	Invisible	Ana, madre Chico Invisible	TV Mini Series	
2024	1992	Amparo	TV Mini Series	

== Accolades ==
Year	Award	Category	Nominee(s)	Result	Ref.
2007	60th Locarno Film Festival	Leopard for Best Actress	The Best of Me	Won	
2013	61st San Sebastián International Film Festival	Silver Shell for Best Actress	Wounded	Won	
2013	28th Mar del Plata International Film Festival	Silver Astor for Best Actress	Wounded	Won	
2014	19th Forqué Awards	Best Actress	Wounded	Won	
2014	1st Feroz Awards	Best Actress	Wounded	Won	
2014	28th Goya Awards	Best Actress	Wounded	Won	
2014	1st Platino Awards	Best Actress	Wounded	Nominated	
2014	1st Fénix Awards	Best Actress	Wounded	Nominated	
2014	27th European Film Awards	Best European Actress	Wounded	Nominated	
2016	30th Goya Awards	Best Supporting Actress	Happy 140	Nominated	
2018	5th Feroz Awards	Best Actress	Dying	Nominated	
2018	73rd CEC Awards	Best Actress	Dying	Nominated	
2023	10th Feroz Awards	Best Supporting Actress in a Series	La unidad	Nominated	
