= Natalia Verbeke =

Argentine-Spanish actress

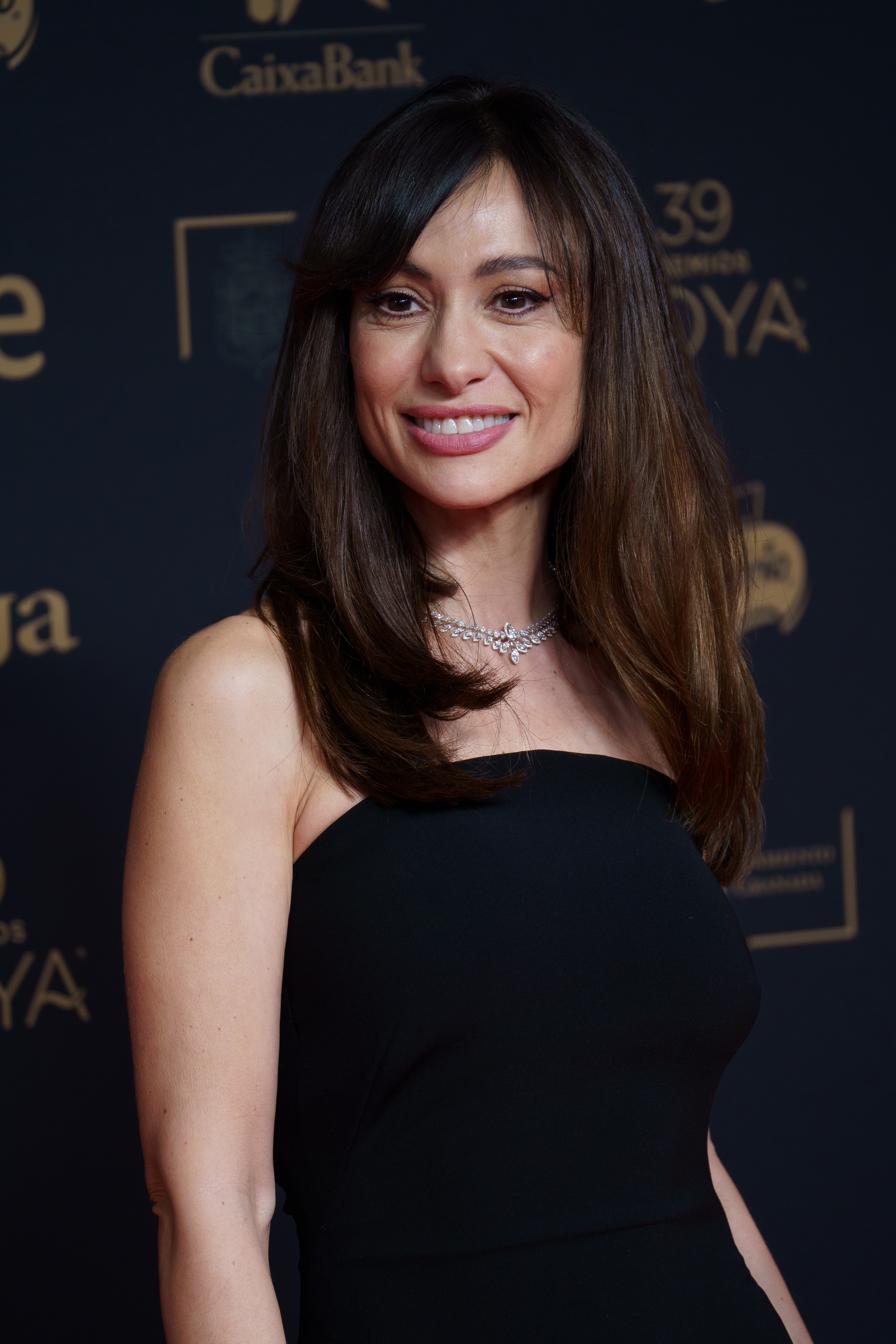
- Verbeke in 2025
- Born: Natalia Carolina Verbeke Leiva; 23 February 1975 (age 51); Buenos Aires, Argentina
- Education: RESAD
- Occupation: Actress
- Years active: 1998 − present
- Children: 1

Natalia Carolina Verbeke Leiva (born 23 February 1975) is an Argentine-Spanish actress. She gained notoriety for her performance in The Other Side of the Bed.

== Biography ==
Natalia Verbeke was born on 23 February 1975 in Buenos Aires. At age 11, she moved to Madrid to join her parents, Argentine emigrants to Spain. She completed her secondary education at the Beatriz Galindo high school in the Madrilenian district of Salamanca. She trained her acting chops at Real Escuela Superior de Arte Dramático (RESAD) and at Escuela Guindalera under Juan Pastor.

Verbeke made her debut performance in a feature film in Un buen novio (1998), in which she starred alongside Fernando Guillén Cuervo. It was followed by roles in films such as Nobody Knows Anybody, Son of the Bride, and The Other Side of the Bed, the latter of which earned Verbeke wide popularity.

She received two Ondas Awards for the latter two films. In 2005, she starred as María in By Force. In 2011 she featured in French film The Women on the 6th Floor with Fabrice Luchini and Sandrine Kiberlain.

Onstage, Verbeke has performed in a production of A Midsummer Night's Dream in England. On television, she has starred in El pantano (The Reservoir), Al filo de la ley (At the Edge of the Law), and Los Serrano (The Serranos).

She has had one daughter from her relationship with rugby player Marcos Poggi.

== Filmography ==
=== Film ===
Year	Title	Role	Notes	Ref.
1998	Un buen novio	Verónica	Feature film debut	
1999	Nadie conoce a nadie (Nobody Knows Anybody)	María		
2000	Carretera y manta (To the End of the Road)			
2000	Kasbah	Alix		
2001	Jump Tomorrow	Alicia		
2001	El hijo de la novia (Son of the Bride)	Naty		
2002	El otro lado de la cama (The Other Side of the Bed)	Paula		
2002	Apasionados (Passionate People)	Uma		
2003	Días de fútbol (Football Days)	Violeta		
2003	Dot the i	Carmen Colazzo		
2004	El juego de la verdad (The Truth and Other Lies)	Susana		
2005	Tempesta (The Venice Conspiracy)	Chiara		
2003	El Cid: La leyenda (El Cid: The Legend)	Gimena	Voice work	
2004	El juego de la verdad (The Truth and Other Lies)	Susana		
2005	A golpes (By Force)	María		
2005	El método (The Method)	Montse		
2006	GAL	Marta Castillo		
2007	Arritmia (Guantanamero)	Manuela		
2010	Les femmes du 6e Étage (The Women on the 6th Floor)	María González		
2017	El último traje (The Last Suit)	Claudia		
2026	Lapönia (Welcome to Lapland)	Mónica		
2026	Citas: la película (Dating in Barcelona)	Mar		

=== Television ===
Year	Title	Role	Notes	Ref.
2003	El pantano			
2005	Al filo de la ley (At The Edge of the Law)			
2007–08	Los Serrano	Ana Blanco	Introduced in season 6	
2009–11	Doctor Mateo	Adriana Pozuelo		
2014	Bienvenidos al Lolita	Violeta Reina		
2016	El Caso. Crónica de sucesos	Rebeca Martín		
2021	Ana Tramel. El juego (ANA. all in)	Concha		
2022	Todos mienten	Ana		

=== Music videos ===
Year	Artist	Song	Ref.
2003	El Canto del Loco	"Ya Nada Volverá a Ser Como Antes"	

== Accolades ==
Year	Award	Category	Work	Result	Ref.
2001	4th British Independent Film Awards	Most Promising Newcomer	Jump Tomorrow	Nominated	
2003	12th Actors and Actresses Union Awards	Best Film Actress in a Leading Role	The Other Side of the Bed	Nominated	
2022	30th Actors and Actresses Union Awards	Best Television Actress in a Secondary Role	ANA. all in	Nominated	
