= Hospital Universitari General de Catalunya =

- Quiron Salut
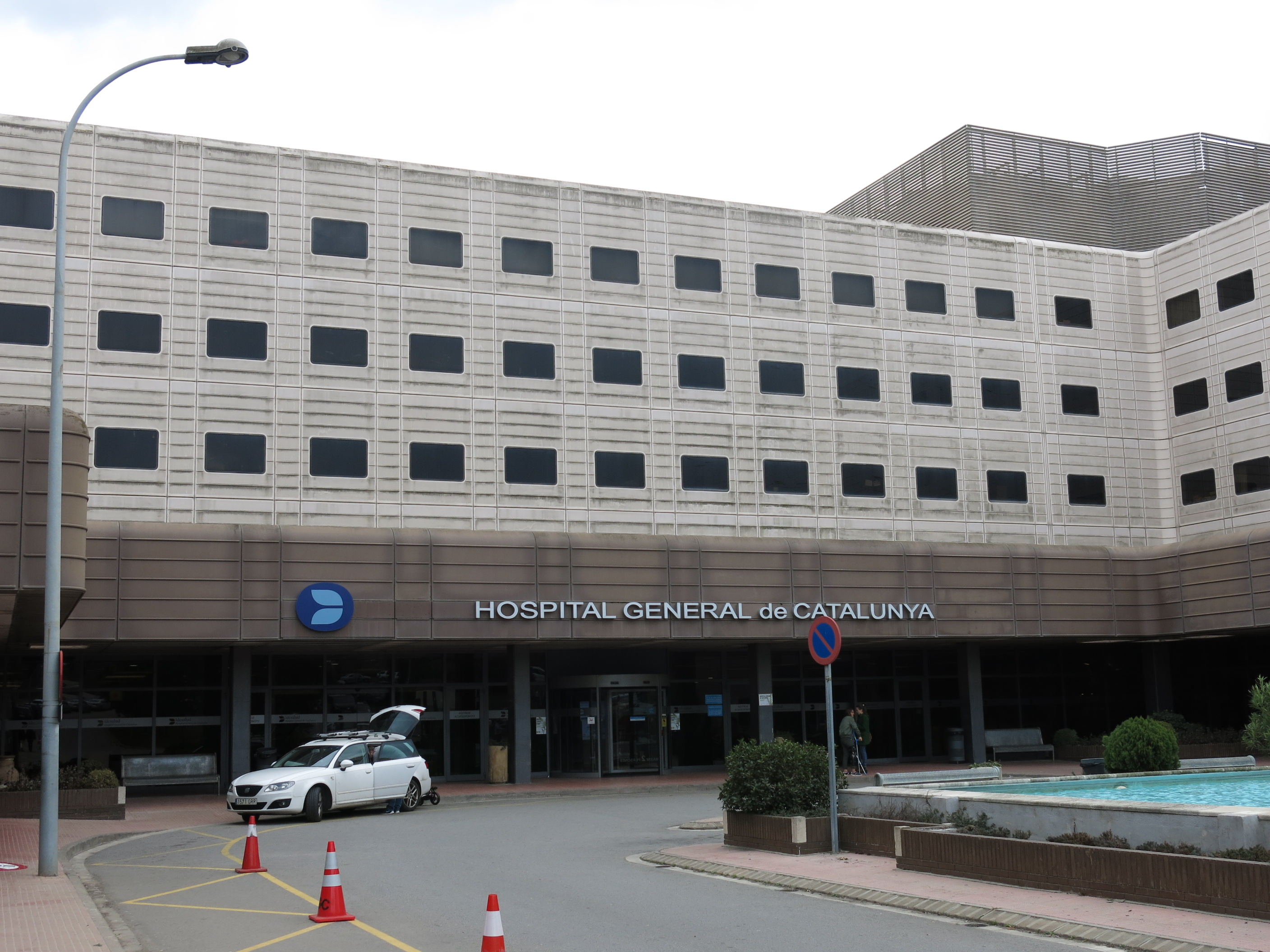
- 03 Hospital General de Catalunya (Sant Cugat del Vallès)

Geography
- Location: Sant Cugat del Vallès, Catalonia
- Coordinates: 41°28′30″N 2°02′41″E

Organisation
- Care system: Private
- Religious affiliation: None
- Network: Quiron Salut

Services
- Beds: 300

History
- Opened: 1984 (renovated 2001)

Links
- Website: www.hgc.es

Hospital Universitari General de Catalunya (English: General Teaching Hospital of Catalonia) is a private hospital in Sant Cugat del Vallès, Barcelona, Catalonia, and also serves as the teaching hospital of the Faculty of Medicine of the International University of Catalonia (UIC).

Whilst the hospital officially does not specify in any medical field, it is one of the highest rated in Catalonia for general surgery. The hospital is equipped with five operating theatres and over 20 general surgeons. Furthermore, a large part of the hospital's area is dedicated to inpatient suites where patients are kept before and after surgery and additionally in cases of needing prolonged medical attention or observation.

== Specialties ==
- Allergy treatment
- Anesthetics and resuscitation
- Cardiac surgery
- Cardiology
- Care continuity unit
- Clinical laboratory
- Clinical hematology
- Dermatology
- Emergency medicine
- Endocrinology
- Digestive surgery
- Hospital pharmacy
- Intensive care medicine
- Internal medicine and infectious diseases
- Medical oncology
- Medical physics and radiological protection
- Nephrology
- Neurology
- Neurosurgery
- Obstetrics and gynaecology
- Ophthalmology
- Orthopedic and traumatological surgery
- Otorhinolaryngology
- Pediatric surgery
- Pediatrics
- Plastic surgery
- Pulmonology
- Radiology
- Radiotherapy oncology
- Rehabilitation
- Rheumatology
- Urology
- Vascular surgery
