= The Rebirth (film) =

- DVD cover
- Directed by: Masahiro Kobayashi
- Written by: Masahiro Kobayashi
- Produced by: Naoko Kobayashi
- Starring: Masahiro Kobayashi; Makiko Watanabe; Harumi Nakayama
- Cinematography: Koichi Nishikubo
- Edited by: Naoki Kaneko
- Production company: Monkey Town Productions
- Release dates: August 2007 (Locarno); November 24, 2007 (Japan)
- Running time: 102 minutes
- Country: Japan
- Language: Japanese

The Rebirth (Japanese: 愛の予感, Hepburn: Ai no yokan; lit. "Premonition of Love") is a Japanese film directed by Masahiro Kobayashi. It won the Golden Leopard at the 2007 Locarno International Film Festival.

== Cast ==
- Masahiro Kobayashi
- Makiko Watanabe
- Harumi Nakayama

== Reception ==
The film won the Golden Leopard at the 2007 Locarno International Film Festival.
