= One Minute to Nine =

- Theatrical poster for One Minute to Nine
- Directed by: Tommy Davis
- Written by: Tommy Davis
- Produced by: Jaime Davila
- Starring: Wendy Maldonado
- Cinematography: Tommy Davis
- Edited by: Luis de Leon; Geof Bartz (Every F---ing Day of My Life)
- Music by: Leonardo Heiblum; Jacobo Lieberman
- Production company: Quinto Malo Films
- Distributed by: HBO Documentary Films
- Release dates: August 5, 2007 (Locarno Film Festival); July 24, 2009 (United States)
- Running time: 83 minutes
- Country: United States
- Language: English

One Minute to Nine is a 2007 documentary film written and directed by Tommy Davis and produced by Quinto Malo Films. It was later re-edited and screened on HBO as Every F---ing Day of My Life. The film chronicles the last five days of freedom for Wendy Maldonado before she and her son are sentenced for the manslaughter death of her husband and explores the years of domestic abuse the family experienced prior to his death.

== Background ==
In May 2005, in Grants Pass, Oregon, Wendy Maldonado was arrested and charged with the murder of her husband, Aaron. According to Wendy Maldonado, the incident took place after almost 20 years of violent domestic abuse committed by Aaron against his wife and their four sons. Days later her eldest son, Randall (known as Randy), was arrested for his part in the killing. In 2006, a plea bargain led Wendy and Randy to plead guilty to the reduced charges of manslaughter. Wendy was sentenced to 120 months imprisonment and Randy to 75 months imprisonment. Before sentencing, Randy was detained in jail while Wendy was allowed home on bail to take care of her other three children.

The film follows Wendy in the final days before she begins her sentence and includes home video footage of the family over the years of the Maldonado's marriage, and interviews with friends, family members and neighbors, some of whom witnessed the domestic abuse.

== Release ==
One Minute to Nine was screened at the 2007 Locarno International Film Festival in Switzerland, where it received Special Mention for Best Feature Length Documentary. The film was later re-edited by Geof Bartz for HBO Documentary Films and retitled it Every F-ing Day of My Life. The new title was drawn from the telephone call to emergency services that Wendy made immediately after killing Aaron. When asked by the operator if her husband had abused her, Wendy responded "every fucking day of my life". The re-edited documentary was screened on HBO on December 14, 2009.
