= The Shoe (film) =

1998 film directed by Laila Pakalniņa

- French theatrical release poster
- Directed by: Laila Pakalniņa
- Written by: Laila Pakalniņa
- Produced by: Christoph Hahnheiser
- Starring: Ivars Brakovskis
- Cinematography: Gints Bērziņš
- Edited by: Sandra Alksne
- Release date: 29 August 1998
- Running time: 83 minutes
- Countries: Germany; Latvia
- Languages: Russian; Latvian

The Shoe (Latvian: Kurpe, German: Der Schuh) is a 1998 drama film directed by Laila Pakalniņa. It was screened in the Un Certain Regard section at the 1998 Cannes Film Festival.

== Cast ==
- Ivars Brakovskis as Militiaman Kristaps
- Igors Buraks as Andrej
- Viktors Čestnovs as Roberts
- Andrejs Garnavl as Lieutenant
- Vadims Grossmans as Volodja
- Jevgeņijs Ivaničevs as Major Johanson
- Alna Jaunzeme as Nina
- Vilke Līmans as Vilka
- Jaan Tätte as Juhan
- Oļegs Teterins as Master Sergeant Manedov
- Aija Uzulēna as Jautrite
- Irina Yegorova as Roberts's wife
