= Olivo Barbieri =

Italian artist and photographer

Olivo Barbieri (born 1954, in Carpi, Emilia-Romagna) is an Italian artist and photographer of urban environments.

He is recognized for his innovative technique creating miniature still photography from actual landscapes by simulating shallow depth of field via the use of tilt-shift lens photography. Barbieri's technique simulates the shallow depth of field effect of macro photography by tilting the lens's angle to the back plane of the camera, which creates a gradual blurring at the top and bottom edges, or left and right edges of the filmed image. The technique is called selected focus and the effect is that a picture of an actual city looks like the picture of a model.

== Career ==
Barbieri began his career in photography studying at DAMS (Drama, Art and Music Studies) at the Faculty of Arts and Humanities of the University of Bologna. After 1971, his interest in photography grew and, initially, he focused his research on artificial lighting. In 1978, he took part in several exhibitions in Italy and also abroad. In 1989 he started to travel regularly to the Far East, particularly to China.

In 1993, 1995 and 1997 Barbieri exhibited his work at the Venice Biennale, among other international exhibitions, and in galleries and museums throughout Europe, North America, and China. In 1996, the Museum Folkwang in Essen, Germany, devoted a retrospective to his work, which has been collected by museums worldwide. In 1998 and 1999, his work was featured in two exhibitions at the Canadian Centre for Architecture in Montreal.

In 2003, Barbieri started the Site Specific project (photos and films) describing cities like Rome, Turin, Montreal, Amman, Las Vegas, Los Angeles, Shanghai, Siviglia, New York and others. He has realised several 35mm films within this project:

- site specific_ROMA 04
- site specific_SHANGHAI 04
- site specific_LAS VEGAS 05
- SEVILLA → (∞) 06
- site specific_MODENA 08

Site specific_ROMA 04 was exhibited in 2005 at Museum of Contemporary Art Chicago, at the Hayward Gallery of London and at Museo di arte moderna e contemporanea di Trento e Rovereto (MART).

== Films ==
In 2005 he also started two series of movies called Seascape# and Riverscape#, which include:

- Seascape#1 Night, China Shenzhen, 2005
- Seascape#2 Castel dell’Ovo, Napoli, 2006
- Rivescape#1, Night, China Shanghai 2007

Other movies realised by Barbieri are:

- Beijing Sky, 2007
- 5 Colori, 2008
- TWIY, 2008
- Tuscany in 6 pieces, 2010

Barbieri's films have been presented in the most important international festivals, including:

- Locarno Film Festival: 2004, 2005, 2008;
- International Film Festival Rotterdam: 2004, 2006;
- Medien und architectktur Biennale Graz: 2005–2007;
- Toronto International Film Festival: 2005, 2006;
- Wexner Center for the Arts, Columbus, Ohio: 2006;
- New York Film Festival: 2006;
- Sundance Film Festival: 2006, 2008;
- San Francisco International Film Festival: 2006, 2007;
- Berkeley Art Museum and Pacific Film Archive, Berkeley: 2006, 2007;
- Walker Art Center, Minneapolis: 2007;
- MoMA, New York: 2007;
- Jeu De Paume, Paris: 2007;
- Tate Modern, London: 2007;
- Berlin Film Festival: 2007.

== Personal ==
He lives and works in Milan.

== Books ==
Several books and catalogues have been published on Barbieri's work, including:

- Paesaggi in Miniatura, Udine, 1991
- Notte, Udine, 1991
- Olivo Barbieri seit 1978, Museum Folgwan, Essen, 1996
- Illuminazioni Artificiali, Milan, 1995, Washington, D.C., 1998
- Notsofareast, Rome, 2002
- Paintings, Florence, 2002
- site Specific_Roma 04, Rome, 2004
- site Specific_Las Vegas 05, Toronto, 2005
- site specific_SHANGHAI 04, Bologna, 2006
- site specific_NYC 07, Carpi, 2007
- TWIY, Napoli, 2008
- site specific_JORDAN 04, Genova, 2008
- The Waterfall Project, Bologna, 2008
- site specific_BEIJING 08, Alcamo, 2008
- Site Specific, New York: Aperture, September 2013.

== Awards ==
Barbieri has won several awards and prizes for his work:

- 2008 SEVILLA → (∞) 06, Nashville Film Festival, Best Experimental Short
- 2006 site specific_LAS VEGAS, San Francisco Film Festival, New Visions
- 2006 site specific_ROMA 04, Median und Arkitecture Biennale, Graz, Austria
- 1992 Higashikawa Award, Japan, The Overseas Photographer Prize
- 1990 Premio Friuli Venezia Giulia Fotografia, Italy
