= Alpine Fire =

1985 Swiss drama film

Höhenfeuer (film)
- Directed by: Fredi M. Murer
- Written by: Fredi M. Murer
- Cinematography: Pio Corradi
- Edited by: Helena Gerber
- Music by: Mario Beretta
- Release date: August 1985
- Running time: 120 minutes
- Country: Switzerland
- Language: Swiss German

Alpine Fire (German: Höhenfeuer) is a 1985 Swiss drama film written and directed by Fredi M. Murer. Set on a remote mountain farm, it follows the relationship between a deaf boy and his sister. Shot in the canton of Uri, it won the Golden Leopard at the 1985 Locarno International Film Festival.

== Synopsis ==
Bub, who is deaf from birth, lives with his sister Belli and their parents on a remote mountain farm. Their father resists sending him to an institution, and after leaving school Belli becomes a maid in her own home and a teacher to her younger brother. The two have been inseparable since childhood and love one another.

== Cast ==
The cast includes:

- Thomas Nock as Bub
- Johanna Lier as Belli
- Dorothea Moritz as Mother
- Rolf Illig as Father
- Tilli Breidenbach as Grandmother
- Jörg Odermatt as Grandfather

== Production ==
Murer originally considered Iceland as the setting, but the film was made in Switzerland. It was shot in the canton of Uri, with the main location at Wasserplatten above Silenen and additional filming at Mettener Butzli in the Schächental and at Wissiflue above Wolfenschiessen. Murer said he wanted to avoid postcard-like Alpine imagery and therefore kept recognisable mountain skylines out of frame. Although he used professional actors, the dialogue was written in standard language so it could later be dubbed by Uri amateur performers in local dialect.

== Reception ==
The film won the Golden Leopard at the 1985 Locarno International Film Festival. The award helped give it a strong cinema release, and the film was a major success in Swiss cinemas while also receiving attention abroad. It has also been described as a love story and discussed in relation to the Heimatfilm tradition. It was ranked among the best Swiss films in a 2014 survey by the film magazine Frame.

== Festival screenings ==
The film continued to be shown at later festivals, including the Locarno Film Festival in 2007 and 2019, the Solothurn Film Festival in 2015, the Yamagata International Documentary Film Festival in 2017, and Festival Lumière in 2021. It was screened by Filmstelle on 5 April 2016, with director Fredi M. Murer present for a Q&A after the film.

== See also ==
- List of submissions to the 58th Academy Awards for Best Foreign Language Film
- List of Swiss submissions for the Academy Award for Best Foreign Language Film
