= Das Fräulein =

2006 film directed by Andrea Štaka

- Directed by: Andrea Štaka
- Written by: Andrea Štaka; Barbara Albert; Marie Kreutzer
- Produced by: Susann Rüdlinger
- Starring: Mirjana Karanović; Marija Škaričić; Ljubica Jović
- Cinematography: Igor Martinovic
- Edited by: Gion-Reto Killias
- Music by: Daniel Jakob; Peter Von Siebenthal; Till Wyler
- Distributed by: Film Movement
- Release dates: 7 August 2006 (Locarno Film Festival); 25 January 2007 (Germany)
- Running time: 81 minutes
- Countries: Switzerland; Germany
- Languages: German; Swiss German dialect Serbo-Croatian

Das Fräulein or Fräulein is a 2006 film directed by Swiss filmmaker Andrea Štaka. It won seven award, including the top prize, the Golden Leopard, at the Locarno Film Festival.

== Plot ==
Ruza (Mirjana Karanović) a Serb, left Belgrade more than 25 years ago to seek a new life in Zurich. Now in her fifties, she has completely detached herself from the past. She owns a cafeteria and maintains an orderly, joyless existence. Mila (Ljubica Jović), a waitress there, is a good-humored Croatian woman who also emigrated decades ago, but, unlike Ruza, she dreams of returning to a house on the Croatian coast. Both of them receive a jolt when Ana (Marija Škaričić), a young Bosniak, itinerant woman who has fled Sarajevo, breezes into the cafeteria looking for work. Ruza hires her but is annoyed by Ana's impulsive and spirited efforts to inject life into the cafeteria. Gradually the acrimony will dissipate, as Ana, who hides a tragic secret under her passionate spirit, begins to thaw Ruža's chill, and their relationship will change both women in ways they never anticipated.

== Themes ==
As stated by Štaka, the film touches the issues deeply personal to her. Observing the lives of three Yugoslavian women from different generations who fled from their homeland seeking better future in Switzerland, she contemplates on displacement of our era.

== Reception ==
Das Fräulein was well received by critics. The movie won the Golden Leopard at the 59th Locarno Festival and became the first Swiss film since 1985 to win the award. The film also received the Youth Jury First Prize, as well as the Don Quixote Prize from the International Federation of Film Societies.
