= Laila Pakalniņa =

Latvian film director

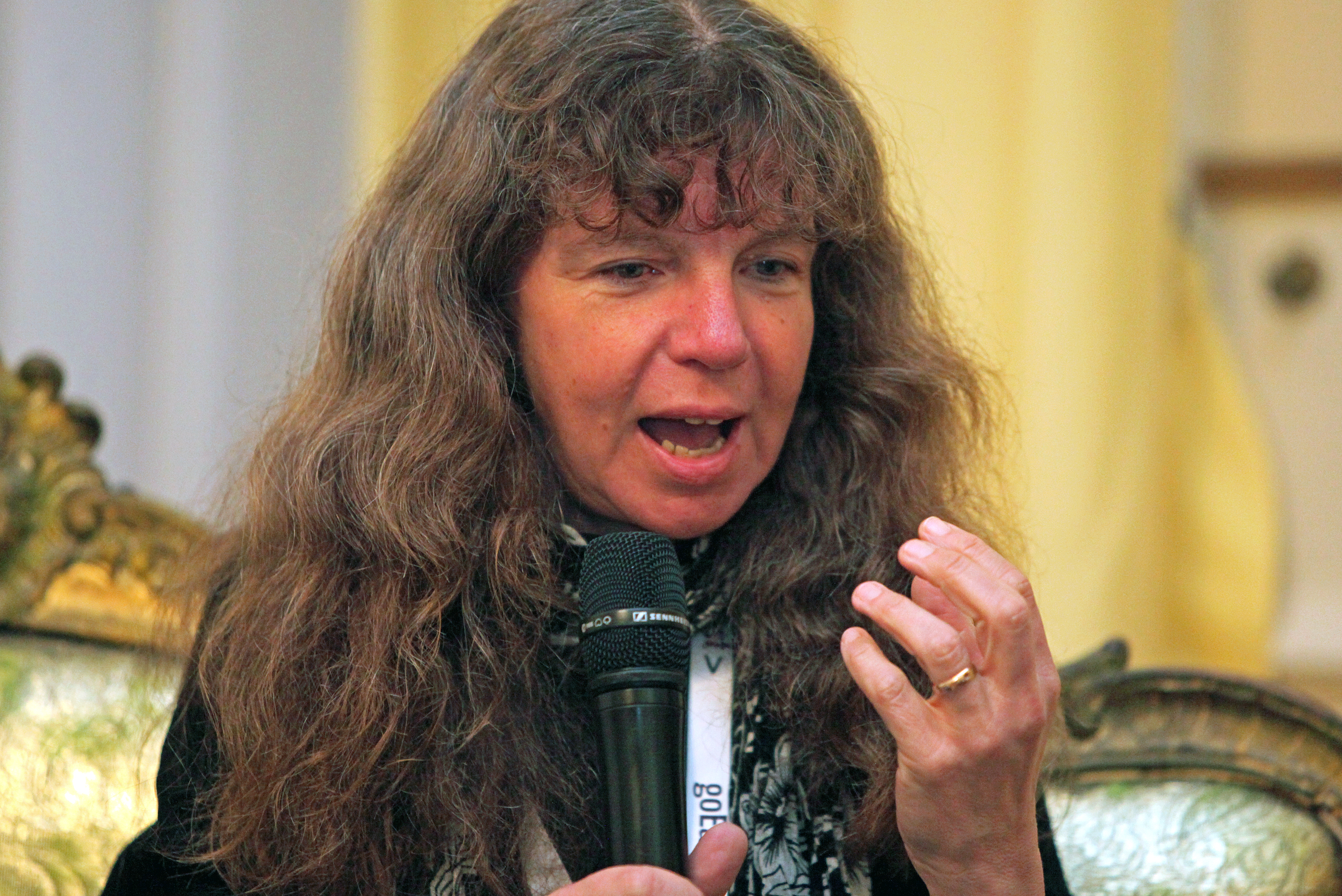
- Pakalniņa in 2016
- Born: 4 June 1962 (age 63); Liepāja, Latvian SSR, Soviet Union (now Latvia)
- Occupations: Film director, screenwriter
- Years active: 1991-present

Laila Pakalniņa (born 4 June 1962) is a Latvian film director and screenwriter. She has directed more than 20 films since 1991. Her film Kurpe was screened in the Un Certain Regard section at the 1998 Cannes Film Festival.

== Filmography ==
- Vela (1991)
- Doms (1991)
- Annas Ziemassvētki (1992)
- Baznīca (1993)
- Prāmis (1996)
- Pasts (1996)
- Ozols (1997)
- The Shoe (Kurpe, 1998)
- Tusya (2000)
- Papa Gena (2001)
- Mostieties! (2001)
- Mārtiņš (2002)
- Pitons (2003)
- Visions of Europe (2004)
- Buss (2004)
- Leiputrija (2004)
- Teodors (2006)
- Ūdens (2006)
- Ķīlnieks (2006)
- Par dzimtenīti (2008)
- Dawn (2015)
- Zirdziņ, hallo! (2017)
- Spoon (2019)
- The First Bridge (short film, 2020)
- In the Mirror (2020)
- Final points (2024)
