= Andrea Štaka =

Swiss film director (born 1973)

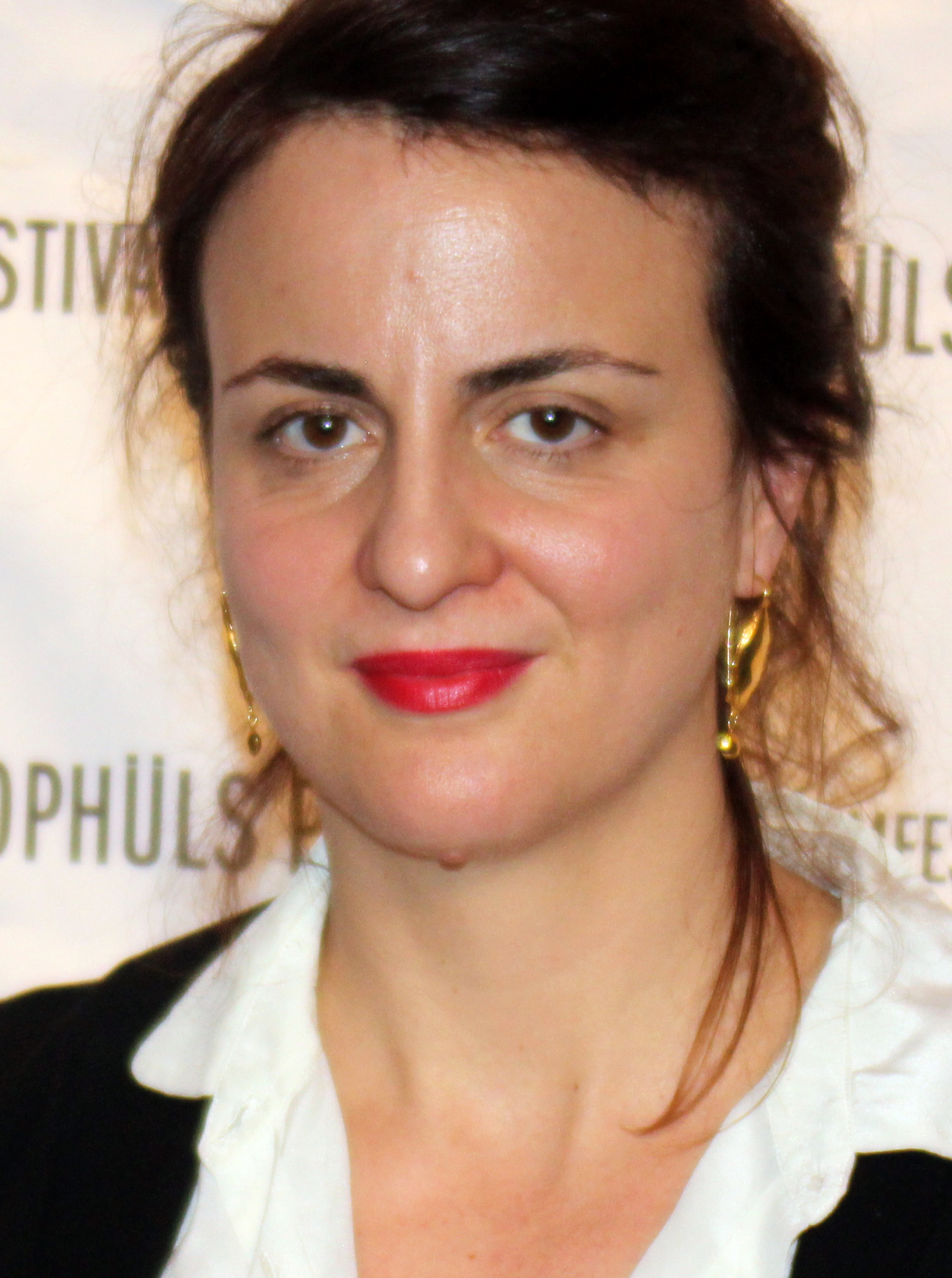
Andrea Štaka in 2015

Andrea Štaka is a Swiss film director and screenwriter, best known for winning the Golden Leopard at the 59th Locarno International Film Festival in 2006 for her film, Das Fräulein.

Štaka was born in Lucerne in 1973. She attended the Foundation Course in Media Studies al London College of Printing, then enrolled at the film and video department of the Hochschule für Gestaltung und Kunst Zürich (1993–98). Her graduation work, a short film Hotel Belgrad, received wide acclaim and won several awards.

Her first feature film Das Fräulein explored a very personal topic — lives of three generations of Yugoslavian women trying to build a life in Switzerland, each haunted with dramas of the past. For this movie, she received Golden Leopard at Locarno Festival and was immediately included into the circle of leading Swiss filmmakers.

Her 2020 feature film Mare starring Marija Škaričić was screened at numerous film festivals and won Best Film award at Festival de Cine de Europa Central y Oriental AL ESTE in Bogota, CICAE award at Sarajevo Film Festival, and Prix de Soleure at Solothurner Filmtage. For her role, Škaričić was awarded with Best Actress Prize at Sarajevo Film Festival and Festival International du Film de Femmes de Salé.

Štaka acted as producer of the film Glaubenberg (2018) directed by Thomas Imbach.

== Filmography ==
- several video clips, 1992–1999
- Hotel Belgrad, 1998, drama, 13 min., 35mm. Various awards including Best Director, Brooklyn International Film Festival, New York; Feature Award, Seh-Süchte Festival, Berlin; Grand Prix du Jury, Rencontres Internationales Henri Langlois, Poitiers.
- Yugodivas, 2000, documentary, 60 min., 35mm. Quality Award, Swiss Federal Office of Culture.
- Das Fräulein, 2006, motion picture, 81min., 35mm. Golden Leopard, 2006 Locarno International Film Festival.
- Cure - Život druge (Cure - The Life of Another), 2014, drama, 83 min.
- Mare, 2020, drama, 84 min.

== Sources ==
- Thomas Stephens (2006-08-12). "Das Fräulein picks up the Golden Leopard". Swissinfo.
