= Fredi M. Murer =

Swiss filmmaker (born 1940)

- Born: Alfred Melchior Murer; 1 October 1940 (age 85); Beckenried, Switzerland
- Occupation: Filmmaker
- Known for: Alpine Fire; Vitus
- Website: fredi-murer.ch

Fredi M. Murer (born 1 October 1940) is a Swiss filmmaker.

== Life and work ==
Murer was born Alfred Melchior Murer in Beckenried, Switzerland. He grew up in Altdorf and went to university in Zurich, where he studied drawing and photography.

He began making films in the mid-1960s. His most famous works are the films Alpine Fire (1985) and Vitus (2006).

From 1992 to 1996, he was president of the Swiss Film-Makers Association. As an innovative and independent filmmaker, Murer has made a major contribution to the renaissance of Swiss cinema. Winner of the City of Zurich Arts Prize in 1995 and the Central Swiss Cultural Prize in 1997, in 2005 he was honoured by the Zurich Foundation for Western Ethics and Culture with a lifetime achievement award. This was the first time the prize had been conferred on a filmmaker, the position of his work in the world of the Swiss cinema being described as "exemplary for the power of its message".

== Filmography ==
- 1985: Alpine Fire
- 1998: Full Moon
- 2006: Vitus
