= 47th Locarno Film Festival =

Film festival in Locarno, Switzerland

- Location: Locarno, Switzerland
- Founded: 1946
- Awards: Golden Leopard: The Jar directed by Ebrahim Forouzesh
- Artistic director: Marco Mueller
- Festival date: Opening: 4 August 1994; Closing: 14 August 1994
- Website: LFF

Locarno Film Festival
- 48th 46th

The 47th Locarno Film Festival was held from 4 to 14 August 1994 in Locarno, Switzerland. This year saw the first release of films with funding from the Locarno festival through its Montecinemaverita foundation. Two films funded by the festival, Bab El-Oued City directed by Merzak Allouache and El Dirigible (The Airship) directed by Pablo Dotta, were screened this year at Locarno and Cannes Film Festivals.

On the Piazza Grande, the 7,000-seat open-air theater, two newly discovered John Cassettes TV movies were screened along with Quentin Tarantino's Pulp Fiction and the world premiere of Le Franc directed by Djibril Diop Mambéty. While, the Leopards of Tomorrow section featured short works from film schools around the world.

A trilogy of Abbas Kiarostami pictures were shown at the festival. Accompanying these screenings was a brand new documentary about Kiarostami. The Locarno festival was an early champion of his work and had shown a particular interest in Iranian film. This year two Iranian films had their international premiere in competition. Both were originally shot in 1992, but had generated a lot of controversy in Iran and were only released this year.

The Golden Leopard, the festival's top prize, was awarded to The Jar directed by Ebrahim Forouzesh.

== Jury ==
- John Waters, American director
- Chantal Akerman, Belgian director
- Aureilo Grimaldi, Italian director
- Clara Law Chuck-Yu, Hong Kong director
- Mohsen Makhmalbaf, Iranian director.
- Dominique Paini, French critic
- Theres Sherer-Kollbrunner, Swiss
- Yermek Shinarbayev, Kazakhstan director
- Cy Twombly, American artist

== Official Sections 1994 ==
The following films were screened in these sections:

=== Piazza Grande ===
The Piazza Grande is the 7,000-seat open-air theater assembled in the town square each year. This year it had 29 x 20 meter screen.

English Title	Original Title	Director(s)	Year	Production Country
A Pair Of Boots		John Cassavetes	1962	USA
The Emigrant	Al-Mouhaguer	Youssef Chahine	1994	Egypt, France
Exotica		Atom Egoyan	1994	Canada
The Whores	Le Buttane	Aurelio Grimaldi	1994	Italia
Le Franc		Djibril Diop Mambéty	1994	Senegal, Switzerland
Muriel's Wedding		P. J. Hogan	1994	Australia
Pulp Fiction		Quentin Tarantino	1994	USA
No Skin	Senza Pelle	Alessandro D'Alatri	1994	Italia
Speed		Jan de Bont	1994	USA
Night Train	Train De Nuit	Michel Piccoli	1994	France
Three Colours: Red	Trois Couleurs: Rouge	Krzysztof Kieślowski	1993	France, Poland
Too Much Sun	Troppo Sole	Giuseppe Bertolucci	1993	Italia
Eat Drink Man Woman	Yinshi Nannü	Ang Lee	1994	Taiwan
Crime Story	重案組	Kirk Wong	1993	Hong Kong
Through the Olive Trees	Zir E Darakhtan-E Zeytun	Abbas Kiarostami	1994	Iran

=== Main Competition ===
Main Competition of Feature Films

English Title	Original Title	Director(s)	Year	Production Country
The Abadanis	Abadani-Ha	Kianoush Ayari	1993	Iran
Babylon: Fear is Man's Best Friend	Babylon: La Paura È La Migliore Amica Dell'Uomo	Guido Chiesa	1994	Italia
Movie Days	Biodagar	Fridrik Thor Fridriksson	1993	Iceland
Chungking Express	Chongqing Senlin	Wong Kar-wai	1994	Hong Kong
Like Two Crocodiles	Come Due Coccodrilli	Giacomo Campiotti	1993	Italia, France
Emmène-Moi		Michel Spinosa	1994	France
Ermo		Zhou Xiaowen	1994	China
Joe & Marie		Tania Stöcklin	1994	Switzerland
To the Starry Island	Keusome Kakosipta	Park Kwang-su	1993	South Korea
The Jar	Khomreh	Ebrahim Forouzesh	1992	Iran
The Flood	L'Inondation	Igor Minaiev	1993	Russia, France
The Sex Lives of Belgians	La Vie Sexuelle Des Belges	Jan Bucquoy	1994	Belgium
Crystal Book	Le Livre De Cristal	Patricia Plattner	1994	Switzerland
Lou n'a pas dit non		Anne-Marie Miéville	1994	France, Switzerland
Marie's Song: I Was I Know Not Where	Maries Lied Ich War Ich Weiss Nicht Wo	Niko Brücher	1994	Germany
Border Line	Metechmio	Panos Karkanevatos	1993	Greece
Pax		Eduardo Guedes	1994	Portugal
Nobody Loves Me	Personne ne m'aime	Marion Vernoux	1993	France, Switzerland
Rosine		Lisa Fässler	1994	France
The Glass Shield		Charles Burnett	1993	USA
Viva Castro!		Boris Frumin	1993	Russia

=== Filmmakers of the Present ===
Filmmakers of the Present - Out of Competition (Fuori Concorso)

Original Title	English Title	Director(s)	Year	Production Country
Au Nom Du Duce	On Behalf of the Duce	Kira Muratova	1994	Israel, France
Cortile Cascino	Cascino Courtyard	Michael Roemer, Robert M. Young	1961	USA
Dans La Vallee De La Wupper	In the Wupper Vallee	Kira Mouratova	1994	Israel, France
Déjà S'Envole La Fleur Maigre	Already Fly Away the Skinny Flower	Paul Meyer		Belgium
Foix		Luc Moullet	1994	France, Georgia
Les Enfants Jouent À La Russie	Children Play Russia	Jean-Luc Godard	1993	Switzerland, France
Lothringen!	Lorraine!	Danièle Huillet, Jean-Marie Straub	1994	Germany
Queen Mary '87		Danièle Huillet	1993	Israel, France
Seule, Georgie	Alone, Georgie	Otar Iosseliani	1994	France, Georgia
Toujours Plus	Ever more	Luc Moullet	1994	France, Georgia
Tracking Down Maggie		Nick Broomfield	1994	USA
TV Nation		Michael Moore	1993	USA
Veillees D'Armes (Le Journalisme En Temps De Guerre)	Weapons (Journalism in Wartime)	Marcel Ophuls	1994	France, Georgia
Zenshin Shosetsu	Theory of the Whole Body	Kazuo Hara	1994	Japan

=== Leopards of Tomorrow ===
Leopards of Tomorrow (Pardi di Domani) in Competition

Canadian Short Films – In Competition
Original Title	English Title	Director(s)	Year	Production Country
At The Races		Daniel Conrad	1994	Canada
Ave Verum Corpus	Hail True Body	Luise-Marie Beauchamp, Alain Des Rochers	1993	Canada
Blue		Don McKellar	1992	Canada
Frank'S Cock		Mike Hoolboom	1993	Canada
Girl From Moush		Gariné Torossian	1993	Canada
Le Petit Musee De Velasquez	The Small Velasquez Museum	Bernar Hébert	1994	Canada
Le Retraité	The Retiree	Yves Bélanger	1994	Canada
Mama'S Boy		Tony Asimakopoulos	1992	Canada
Off Key		Karethe Linaae	1994	Canada
Rew F. Fwd		Denis Villeneuve	1994	Canada
Stroke		Mark Sawers	1992	Canada
The Night I Was Wed		Lori Lansens	1993	Canada
The Passion Of Rita Camilleri		Valerie Buhagiar	1993	Canada
The Roccotello Files		Andrew Nisker	1993	Canada
The Station		Trenton Carlson	1993	Canada
Weight Of The World		Brian Stockton	1994	Canada
Without Rockets		Gary Yates	1994	Canada
You Love Me & I Hate You		Rosamund Owen	1994	Canada
American Short Films – In Competition
Original title	English title	Director(s)	Year	Production country
Avenue X		Leslie McCleave	1993	USA
Brief Gardens		Nora Hoppe	1993	USA
Bullethead		David Munro	1993	USA
Central Park		Sande Zeig	1994	USA
Cigarettes And Coffee		Paul Thomas Anderson	1992	USA
Dance		Gary Goldberg	1993	USA
Dropping The Bomb On My Street		Nora Maccoby	1994	USA
Family Remains		Tamara Jenkins	1993	USA
Leftovers		Paul Reuter	1992	USA
Maintenance		Jesse Feigelman	1994	USA
Night Ride		Andrew Garrison	1993	USA
Notes On A Scale		Kenn Kashima	1994	USA
Ollywoo		Jon Stout	1994	USA
Outside		Matt Danciger	1993	USA
Pleasant Hill, U.S.A.		Joshua Wintrigham	1993	USA
Some Folks Call It a Sling Blade		George Hickenlooper	1994	USA
That Happens		Leonardo Veras	1994	USA
The Cage		Noah Lerner	1994	USA
The Clean Up		Jane Weinstock	1993	USA
The Last Good Breath		Kimberly Peirce	1993	USA
The Obit Writer		Brian Cox	1993	USA
The Salesman And Other Adventures		Hannah Weyer	1994	USA
The Smell Of Burning Ants		Jay Rosenblatt	1994	USA
Think Tank		James Carman	1993	USA
Ti-Boy'S Wife		Richard Blue Lormand	1993	USA
Tommy'S		Barry Ellsworth	1993	USA
Swiss Short Films – In Competition
Original title	English title	Director(s)	Year	Production country
8, Rue Vavin		Michael Peterli	1993	Switzerland
B8 - E 1!		Stefan Jäger	1994	Switzerland
Bel Canto	Belly	François Bovy	1994	Switzerland
Berg Partikel	Mountain Particle	Richard Vetterli	1994	Switzerland
Cap Vert		François Kohler	1994	Switzerland
Celine		Hedi Bäbler	1993	Switzerland
Gänsehaut	Goose Flesh	Laszlo Kish, Kurt Reinhard	1993	Switzerland
Il Lattaio	Lacta	Michelangelo Gandolfi	1994	Switzerland
Jagdzeit	Jagga	Rolando Colla	1994	Switzerland
Le Songe D'Isaac	Isaac's Dream	Ursula Meier	1994	Switzerland
Nu Comme Un Poisson	Naked Like a Fish	Patrick Bürge	1994	Switzerland
Regarde-Moi	Look at Me	Elisabeth Aubert	1993	Switzerland
The Amazing Alexander		Misha Gyorik	1993	Switzerland
Und Tschüss	And Goodbye	Walter Feistle, Stephane Schneider	1993	Switzerland
Villes Mises En Scène: Cergy-Pontoise Une Ville Bien Dans Son Temps	Cities Staged: Cergy-Pontoise a City Well in Its Time	Stefan Meichtry, Felix Schaad	1994	Switzerland

Leopards of Tomorrow (Pardi di Domani) Out-of-Competition

Atom Egoyan - Special Program
Original title	English title	Director(s)	Year	Production country
En Passant	Passing	Atom Egoyan	1992	Canada
Howard In Particular		Atom Egoyan	1979	Canada
Open House		Atom Egoyan	1982	Canada
Peep House		Atom Egoyan	1981	Canada
Special Program Direct By "Â¿"
Smoking		Matthew Modine	1994	USA
The Last Supper		Daryl Hannah	1993	USA
Swiss Animation
Cadavre Exquis	Exquisite Corpse	Schweizer Trickfimgruppe	1993	Switzerland
Hoffen Auf Bessere Zeiten	Hope for Better Times	Jonas Raeber	1993	Switzerland
Thaumatrope- Robert Fulton Tanner		Dolores Camenisch	1993	Switzerland
Unko	For Them	Remo Höpfliger	1994	Switzerland
Zehn Kleine Negerlein	Ten Little Negroes	Jochen Ehmann	1993	Switzerland
À La Recherche D'Adèle	In Search of Adèle	Martial Wannaz	1993	Switzerland
Über Den Tag Hinaus	Beyond the Day	Robi Müller	1994	Switzerland
Tribute To the 30th Anniversary of the Solothurn Film Festival (Hommage aux 30 ans des Journées cinématographiques de Soleure)
Blumengedicht	Flower Poem	Peter von Gunten	1967	Switzerland
C'Etait Un Dimanche En Automne...	It Was a Sunday in the Fall ...	Claude Champion	1970	Switzerland
Chicoree		Fredi M. Murer	1966	Switzerland
Fed-Up		Villi Hermann	1969	Switzerland
Le Panier À Viande	The Meat Basket	Hedi Bäbler, Yves Yersin	1966	Switzerland
Pic-Nic		Georg Randanowicz	1967	Switzerland
Vita Parcoeur		Rolf Lyssy	1970	Switzerland

=== Retrospective – Frank Tashlin ===
==== Cartoons ====
Frank Tashlin / Cartoons
Original Title	English Title	Director(s)	Year	Production Country
Behind the Meat Ball		Frank Tashlin	1945	USA
Booby Hatched		Frank Tashlin	1944	USA
Brother Brat		Frank Tashlin	1944	USA
Censored		Frank Tashlin	1944	USA
Cinderella Goes to a Party		Frank Tashlin	1942	USA
Corny Concerto		Frank Tashlin	1943	USA
Cracked Ice		Frank Tashlin	1938	USA
Hare Remover		Frank Tashlin	1946	USA
Have You Got Any Castles?		Frank Tashlin	1938	USA
I Got Plenty of Mutton		Frank Tashlin	1944	USA
Little Beau Porky		Frank Tashlin	1936	USA
Little Pancho Vanilla		Frank Tashlin	1938	USA
Nasty Quacks		Frank Tashlin	1945	USA
Now That Summer Is Gone		Frank Tashlin	1938	USA
Plane Daffy		Frank Tashlin	1944	USA
Porky at the Crocadero		Frank Tashlin	1938	USA
Porky in the North Woods		Frank Tashlin	1936	USA
Porky Pig's Feat		Frank Tashlin	1943	USA
Porky The Fireman		Frank Tashlin	1938	USA
Porky's Double Trouble		Frank Tashlin	1937	USA
Porky's Poultry Plant		Frank Tashlin	1936	USA
Porky's Railroad		Frank Tashlin	1937	USA
Porky's Romance		Frank Tashlin	1937	USA
Porky's Spring Planting		Frank Tashlin	1938	USA
Puss n' Booty		Frank Tashlin	1943	USA
Scrap Happy Daffy		Frank Tashlin	1943	USA
Speaking of the Weather		Frank Tashlin	1937	USA
Tales of Two Mice		Frank Tashlin	1945	USA
The Case of the Stuttering Pig		Frank Tashlin	1937	USA
The Fox and the Grapes		Frank Tashlin	1941	USA
The Home Front		Frank Tashlin	1943	USA
The Major Lied 'Til Dawn		Frank Tashlin	1938	USA
The Stupid Cupid		Frank Tashlin	1944	USA
Swooner Crooner		Frank Tashlin	1944	USA
The Unruly Hare		Frank Tashlin	1945	USA
The Woods Are Full of Cuckoos		Frank Tashlin	1937	USA
Wholly Smoke		Frank Tashlin	1938	USA
You're an Education		Frank Tashlin	1938	USA

==== Feature films ====
Frank Tashlin / Feature Films
Original title	English title	Director(s)	Year	Production country
Artists and Models		Frank Tashlin	1955	USA
Bachelor Flat		Frank Tashlin	1962	USA
Caprice		Frank Tashlin	1967	USA
Cinderfella		Frank Tashlin	1960	USA
Hollywood or Bust		Frank Tashlin	1956	USA
It's Only Money		Frank Tashlin	1962	USA
Marry Me Again		Frank Tashlin	1953	USA
Rock-A-Bye Baby		Frank Tashlin	1958	USA
Say One for Me		Frank Tashlin	1959	USA
Son of Paleface		Frank Tashlin	1952	USA
Susan Slept Here		Frank Tashlin	1954	USA
The Alphabet Murders		Frank Tashlin	1966	USA
The Disorderly Orderly		Frank Tashlin	1964	USA
The First Time		Frank Tashlin	1952	USA
The Geisha Boy		Frank Tashlin	1958	USA
The Girl Can't Help It		Frank Tashlin	1956	USA
The Glass Bottom Boat		Frank Tashlin	1966	USA
The Lemon Drop Kid		Frank Tashlin, Sidney Lanfiled	1951	USA
The Lieutenant Wore Skirts		Frank Tashlin	1956	USA
The Man from the Diner's Club		Frank Tashlin	1963	USA
The Private Navy of Sgt. O'Farrell		Frank Tashlin	1968	USA
Who's Minding the Store?		Frank Tashlin	1963	USA
Will Success Spoil Rock Hunter?		Frank Tashlin	1957	USA

=== Cinema ===
Cinema/Cinemas
Original Title	English Title	Director(s)	Year	Production Country
Cinema De Notre Temps: Abbas Kiarostami	Cinema of Our Time: Abbas Kiarostami	Jean-Pierre Limosin	1994	France
It'S All True: Based On An Unfinished Film By Orson Welles		Bill Krohn, Myron Meisel	1993	USA, France
Linguagem De Orson Welles	Orson Welles Language	Rogério Sganzerla, Rogerio Sganzerla	1990	Brazil
Parlons Cinema Ou Les Anti-Cours De Henri Langlois	Let's Talk Cinema or the Anti-Cours of Henri Langlois	Harry Fischbach		France

=== Film Surprise ===
Original Title	English Title	Director(s)	Production Country
Feichang Zhentan	Fe i Field Z is Very Elastic	Fong Ling-Ching	Hong Kong

=== Rediscovered Cinema ===
Rediscovered Cinema: Gallone Opera

	Rediscovered Cinema: Gallone Opera			
English Title	Original Title	Director(s)	Year	Production Country
House of Ricordi	Casa Ricordi	Carmine Gallone	1954	Italia
Casta Diva		Carmine Gallone	1954	Italia
Before Him All Rome Trembled	Davanti A Lui Tremava Tutta Roma	Carmine Gallone	1946	Italia
The Force of Destiny	La Forza Del Destino	Carmine Gallone	1950	Italia
Madame Butterfly		Carmine Gallone	1954	Italia
Tosca		Carmine Gallone	1956	Italia

Rediscovered Cinema: Carlo Ludovico Bragaglia

Rediscovered Cinema: Carlo Ludovico Bragaglia
English Title	Original Title	Director(s)	Year	Production Country
47 Dead that Speak	47 morto che parla	Carlo Ludovico Bragaglia	1951	Italia
Music on the Run	Fuga A Due Voci	Carlo Ludovico Bragaglia	1943	Italia
Your Money or Your Life	O La Borsa O La Vita	Carlo Ludovico Bragaglia	1932	Italia
Toto' Le Moko		Carlo Ludovico Bragaglia	1949	Italia

Swiss Cinema Rediscovered

Swiss Cinema Rediscovered
Original Title	English Title	Director(s)	Year	Production Country
Frauennot . Frauenglück	Frauennot. Women's Happiness	Eduard Tissé	1929	Switzerland

=== Special Programs ===
Special Program
Original Title	English Title	Director(s)	Year	Production Country
Animali Criminali	Criminal Animals	Yervant Ganikian, Angela Ricci Lucchi	1994	Italia, France
Aria		Yervant Ganikian, Angela Ricci Lucchi	1994	Italia, France
Az Karkheh Ta Rhein	The Karkheh Ta Rhein	Ebrahim Hatamikia	1993	Iran
Chakmeh		Mohammad Ali Telebi	1992	Iran
Desvio Al Paraiso	DEVISE AL PARAISO	Gerardo Herrero	1994	Spain
Diario Africano	African Newspaper	Yervant Ganikian, Angela Ricci Lucchi	1994	Italia, France
Did E-Ban		Ebrahim Hatamikia	1988	Iran
Dieu Sait Quoi	God Knows What	Jean-Daniel Pollet	1994	Belgium, France
Ecrire	To Write	Jean-Daniel Pollet	1993	France
Fate In Blu Diesis	Do in Blue Diesis	Silvio Soldini	1994	Italia
Girls in Prison		John McNaughton	1994	USA
Il Congedo Del Viaggiatore Cerimonioso	The Leave of the Cerimous Traveler	Giuseppe Bertolucci	1991	Italia
Il Faut Qu'Une Porte Soit Ouverte Ou Fermee	It is Necessary to be Open or Closed	John McNaughton	1993	France
Jail Breakers		William Friedkin	1994	USA
Khaneh-Ye Dust Kojasti?	Eat-These Dust Cosmic?	Abbas Kiarostami	1987	Iran
La Jeune Fille Au Livre	The Girl in the Book	Jean-Louis Comolli	1994	France
La Place Royale	Place Royale	John Milius		France
Le Demenagement	The House	Chantal Akerman	1992	France
Le Geographe Manuel	Manuel Geographer	Michel Sumpf	1994	France
Motorcycle Gang		John Milius	1994	USA
My Daddy Can Lick Your Daddy		John Cassavetes	1962	USA
Peremena Oucasti	Change of Fate	Kira Mouratova	1987	Russia
Portrait D'Une Jeune Fille De La Fin Des Annees 60 À Bruxelles	Portrait of a Young Girl from the End of the 60s in Brussels	Chantal Akerman	1993	France
Roadracers		Robert Rodriguez	1994	USA
Runaway Daughters		Joe Dante	1994	USA
Ruzi, Ruzagary, Cinema		Mohsen Makhmalbaf	1992	Iran
Sara		Daryosh Mehrjui	1993	Iran
Shake, Rattle'N Rock		Allan Arkush	1994	USA
Sorority Girl		Uli Edel	1994	USA
Tichie Stranicy	Quiet Pages	Aleksandr Sokurov	1993	Russia, Germany
Uccelli - Un Film Enciclopedia Nel Tempo E Nello Spazio	Birds - An Encyclopedia Film in Time and Space	Tonino De Bernardi	1994	Italia
Uvlecenja	Learning	Kira Mouratova	1994	Russia
Va Zendegi Edameh Darad	T	Abbas Kiarostami	1992	Iran
Yihao Tongjifan	Organized Crime & Triad Bureau	Kirk Wong	1994	Hong Kong
Zhongan Ling Ji	Rock N'Roll Cop	Kirk Wong	1993	Hong Kong

== Independent Sections ==
=== Critics Week ===
The Semaine de la Critique is an independent section, created in 1990 by the Swiss Association of Film Journalists in partnership with the Locarno Film Festival.

Original Title	English Title	Director(s)	Year	Production Country
A Dreamscape: Gambling In America		Bernie Ljdis	1994	Netherlands
Air / Vâyu	Water / Vâyu	Velu Veswanadhan	1994	India, France
Bahnhof Brest	Brest Train Station	Gerd Kroske	1994	Germany
Balagan		Andres Veiel	1993	Germany
Ernesto Che Guevara, Le Journal De Bolivie	Ernesto Che Guevara, the Journal De Bolivie	Richard Dindo	1994	Switzerland, France
La Danse Du Singe Et Du Poisson	The Dance of the Monkey and the Fish	Pierre-Alain Meier	1993	Switzerland, France
Picture of Light		Peter Mettler	1994	Canada, Switzerland
Traveller'S Tale		Lars Johansson	1993	Denmark

=== Swiss Cinema ===
Co-Productions '94
Original title	English title	Director(s)	Year	Production country
Bab El-Oued City		Merzak Allouache	1994	Algérie, France
El Dirigible	The Airship	Pablo Dotta	1994	Uruguay, Great Britain
Il Sogno Della Farfalla	The Dream of the Butterfly	Marco Bellocchio	1994	Italia, Switzerland
Sátántangó	Satan's Tango	Béla Tarr	1994	Hungary, Germany
Spaziergang Nach Syracus	Walk to Syracus	Lutz Leonardt, Constantin Wulff		Austria, Switzerland
À La Belle Etoile	To the Beautiful Star	Antoine Desrosières	1994	France, Switzerland
Swiss Films '94
Ausgerechnet Zoe	Calculated Zee	Markus Imboden	1994	Switzerland
Corinna Bille, La Demoiselle Sauvage		Pierre-André Thiébaud	1994	Switzerland
Corps Et Âmes	Body and Souls	Aude Vermeil	1994	Switzerland
Der Kongress Der Pinguine	The Congress of the Penguins	Hans-Ulrich Schlumpf	1993	Switzerland
Die Bettkönigin	The Bed Queen	Gabriel Baur	1994	Switzerland
Estatico Barocco	Baroque Ecstatic	Adriano Kestenholz	1994	Switzerland
Gasser + Gasser	Gases + Gases	Iwan Schumacher	1994	Switzerland
Grossesse Nerveuse	Nerve Pregnancy	Denis Rabaglia	1993	Switzerland
L'Ecume Des Rêves	The School of Dreams	Michel Rodde	1994	Switzerland, France
L'Homme Des Casernes	The Man of the Barracks	Bill Krohn	1994	Switzerland
Nicht Für Die Liebe Geboren?	Not Born for Love?	Angela Meschini	1994	Switzerland
Richard M. Brintzenhofe - The House Of Cards		Rolf Wäber	1994	Switzerland
Well Done		Thomas Imbach	1994	Switzerland

== Official Awards ==
=== Official Jury ===
- Golden Leopard: The Jar directed by Ebrahim Foruzesh
- Silver Leopard: Abadani-Ha directed by Kianoush Ayari
- Bronze Leopard: Rosine directed by Lisa Fässler,
- Bronze Leopard (Special Jury Prize): Bulle Ogier, Lio Ogier, Michèle Laroque, Maaike Jansen, Bernadette Lafont in PERSONNE NE M'AIME directed by Marion Vernoux
- Special Jury Prize (Swissair): Ermo directed by Zhou Xiaowen
- Special Mention, Official Jury: cinematographer Antoine Roch in EMMÈNE-MOI directed by Michel Spinosa

=== Ecumenical Jury ===
- Ecumenical Award: Ermo directed by Zhou Xiaowen
- Special Mentions: Rosine directed by Lisa Fässler, Like Two Crocodiles directed by Giacomo Campiotti

=== CICAE Jury ===
- Prize: The Jar directed by Ebrahim Foruzesh

=== FIPRESCI Jury ===
- International critics award: Ermo directed by Zhou Xiaowen
- Special Mention: Rosine directed by Lisa Fässler

=== Youth Jury ===
- "Carte Jeunes" Prize: Like Two Crocodiles directed by Giacomo Campiotti
- "The environment is the quality of life" Prize: The Jar directed by Ebrahim Foruzesh
- First Prize UBS: Ermo directed by Zhou Xiaowen
- Second Prize UBS: The Jar directed by Ebrahim Foruzesh
- Third Prize UBS: Rosine directed by Lisa Fässler
