= 63rd Locarno Film Festival =

Film festival in Locarno, Switzerland

- Opening film: Au Fond Des Bois (Deep in the Woods) directed by Benoît Jacquot
- Closing film: Sommervogel (Little Paradise) directed by Paul Riniker
- Location: Locarno, Switzerland
- Founded: 1946
- Awards: Golden Leopard: Winter Vacation (Han Jia) directed by Li Hongqi
- Artistic director: Olivier Père
- Festival date: Opening: 4 August 2010; Closing: 14 August 2010
- Website: LFF

Locarno Film Festival
- 64th 62nd

The 63rd Locarno Film Festival was held from 4 to 14 August 2010 in Locarno, Switzerland. The festival featured 40 world premieres, of which half were from first time directors. The opening film of the festival was the world premiere of Benoît Jacquot’s film Au Fond Des Bois (Deep in the Woods). The closing film of the festival was the world premiere of Sommervogel (Little Paradise) directed by Paul Riniker.

The festival had a new artistic director, Olivier Père, following the departure of Federic Marie. Père began his new tenure with noteworthy competition films like the gay underground film L.A. Zombie directed by Bruce LaBruce and the six-hour Chinese documentary Karamay directed by Xu Xin, which contains no score or voice-over. The festival also featured the debut of director Gareth Edwards with his film Monsters, on the Piazza Grande.

Père paired down the festival to focus on the Piazza Grande, Competition, Out of Competition and Filmmakers of the Present categories. Père removed the Here and Elsewhere (Ici et Ailleurs) section and redefined the Filmmakers of the Present competition to exclusively for directors with first or second features.

Pere also created a new connected Industry Days event from 7 to 9 August to try and increase the sale of films at the festival.

The Piazza Grande, the 8,000-seat open-air theater, included a newly restored print of the film To Be Or Not To Be, which was part of a much larger retrospective of director Ernst Lubitsch that included 15 of his feature films. Lubitsch's daughter, Nicola Lubitsch, attend the festival. The Open Doors section focused on films from Central Asian. The Leopard of Honor was awarded to Jia Zhangke and Alain Tanner. The excellence award was given to Chiara Mastroianni.

The Golden Leopard, the festival's top prize, was awarded to Winter Vacation (Han Jia) directed by Li Hongqi.

== Official Jury ==
- Eric Khoo, Singaporean director, Jury president
- Golshifteh Farahani, Iranian actress
- Melvil Poupaud, French actor and director
- Lionel Baier, Swiss director
- Joshua Safdie, American filmmaker

== Official Sections ==
The following films were screened in these sections:

=== Piazza Grande ===
Original Title	English Title	Director(s)	Year	Production Country
Au Fond Des Bois	Deep in the Woods	Benoît Jacquot	2010	France
Cyrus		Mark Duplass, Jay Duplass	2009	USA
Das Letzte Schweigen	The Last Silence	Baran Odar	2010	Germany
Gadkii Utenok	Utenok's Committing	Garri Bardine	2010	Russia
Hugo Koblet - Pédaleur De Charme	Hugo Koblet - Charming Pedaller	Daniel von Aarburg	2010	Switzerland
Kóngavegur	Roy	Valdís Oskarsdottir	2010	Iceland
L'Avocat	Lawyer	Cédric Anger	2010	France
Monsters		Gareth Edwards	2010	Great Britain
Rammbock: Berlin Undead		Marvin Kren	2010	Germany
Rare Exports: A Christmas Tale		Jalmari Helander	2010	Finland
Rubber		Quentin Dupieux	2010	France
Sommervögel	Little Paradise	Paul Riniker	2010	Switzerland
Svet-Ake	Light-Ake	Aktan Arim Kubat	2010	Kyrgyzstan
The Human Resources Manager		Eran Riklis	2010	Israel
Uomini Contro	Men Against	Francesco Rosi	1970	Italia
To Be Or Not To Be		Ernst Lubitsch	1942	USA

=== International Competition ===
Original Title	English Title	Director(s)	Production Country
Bas-Fonds	Shallows	Isild Le Besco	France
Beli Beli Svet	White White World	Oleg Novkovic	Serbia
Beyond The Steppes		Vanja D'Alcantara	Belgium
Cold Weather		Aaron Katz	USA
Curling		Denis Côté	Canada
Han Jia		Li Hongqi	China
Homme Au Bain	Man in a Bath	Christophe Honoré	France
Im Alter Von Ellen	At the Age of Ellen	Pia Marais	Germany
Karamay		XU Xin	China
La Petite Chambre	The Small Room	Stéphanie Chuat, Véronique Reymond	Switzerland
La.Zombie		Bruce LaBruce	Germany
Luz Nas Trevas – A Volta Do Bandido Da Luz Vermelha	Light in Darkness - The Return of the Bandit of Red Light	Helena Ignez Mello, Icaro C. Martins	Brazil
Morgen	Morning	Marian Crisan	France
Periferic	Peripheral	Bogdan George Apetri	Romania
Pietro		Daniele Gaglianone	Italia
Saç	Hair	Tayfun Pirselimoglu	Turkey
Songs Of Love And Hate		Katalin Gödrös	Switzerland
Womb		Benedek Fliegauf	Germany

=== Filmmakers of the Present ===
The Concorso Cineasti del Presente, also known as the Filmmakers of the Present Competition, showcases first and second feature films from emerging filmmakers.

Filmmakers of the Present

Original Title	English Title	Director(s)	Production Country
41153		Özlem Sulak	Turkey
Aardvark	Earthvark	Kitao Sakurai	USA
Burta Balenei	The Whale's Belly	Ana Lungu, Ana Szel	Romania
Foreign Parts		Véréna Paravel, J. P. Sniadecki	USA
Framtidens Melodi	The Melody of the Future	Jonas Bergergård, Jonas Holmström	Sweden
Ivory Tower		Adam Traynor	Canada
Jo Pour Jonathan	Jo for Jonathan	Maxime Giroux	Canada
La Lisière	The Edge	Géraldine Bajard	France
La Vida Sublime	The Life Sublime	Daniel V. Villamediana	Spain
Mandoo		Ebrahim Saeedi	Iraq
Memory Lane		Mikhaël Hers	France
Nijyu Isseiki	Niju, all at Once	Takahiro Yamauchi	Japan
Norberto Apenas Tarde	Norberto Only Late	Daniel Hendler	Uruguay
Paraboles	Parables	Emmanuelle Demoris	France
Prud'Hommes	Industrial Tribunal	Stéphane Goël	Switzerland
Pulsar		Alex Stockman	Belgium
The Fourth Portrait		Mong-Hong Chung	Taiwan
Tilva Roš		Nikola Ležaić	Serbia
You Are Here		Daniel Cockburn	Canada

=== Out of Competition ===
Out of Competition (Fuori Concorso)

Original Title	English Title	Director(s)	Year	Production Country
Avant Les Mots	Before Words	Joachim Lafosse	2010	France
C'Était Hier	It Was Yesterday	Jacqueline Veuve	2010	Switzerland
Gennevilliers		Bertrand Bonello, Lodge Kerrigan, Joachim Lafosse		France
Get Out Of The Car		Thom Andersen	2010	USA
Hell Roaring Creek		Lucien Castaing-Taylor	2010	USA
Io Sono Tony Scott, Ovvero Come L'Italia Fece Fuori Il Più Grande Clarinettista Del Jazz	I Am Tony Scott, that Is, How Italy Did the Greatest Jazz Clarinetist	Franco Maresco	2010	Italia
Jeonju Digital Project		James Benning, Denis Côté, Matías Piñeiro		South Korea
Les Champs Brûlants	Burning Fields	Catherine Libert	2010	Belgium
Les Lignes Ennemies	Enemy Lines	Denis Côté	2010	South Korea
Low Cost (Claude Jutra)		Lionel Baier	2010	Switzerland
Mademoiselle Else		Isabelle Prim	2010	France
Pig Iron		James Benning	2010	South Korea
Return To The Dogs		Lodge Kerrigan	2009	France
Rosalinda		Matías Piñeiro	2010	South Korea
The Indian Boundary Line		Thomas Comerford	2010	USA
Where The Boys Are		Bertrand Bonello	2009	France

Out of Competition - Jean-Marie Straub

Original Title	English Title	Director(s)	Year	Production Country
Corneille - Brecht		Jean-Marie Straub	2009	France
Europa 2005 - 27 Octobre	Europa 2005 - October 27	Danièle Huillet, Jean-Marie Straub	2006	France
Joachim Gatti		Jean-Marie Straub	2009	France
Les Avatars De La Mort D'Empédocle		Jean-Paul Toraille		France
O Somma Luce	Or Sum Light	Jean-Marie Straub	2009	France

Out of Competition - Luc Moullet

Original Title	English Title	Director(s)	Year	Production Country
Chef-D'Oeuvre?	Masterpiece?	Luc Moullet	2010	France
Toujours Moins	Always less	Luc Moullet	2010	France

Out of Competition - Mafrouza Cycle

Original Title	English Title	Director(s)	Year	Production Country
La Main Du Papillon	The Butterfly Hand	Emmanuelle Demoris	2010	France
Mafrouza - Oh La Nuit!	Mafrouza - Oh at Night!	Emmanuelle Demoris	2007	France
Mafrouza/Coeur	Mafrouza/Heart	Emmanuelle Demoris	2007	France
Que Faire?	What to Do?	Emmanuelle Demoris	2010	France

Out of Competition - Yervant Gianikian And Angela Ricci Lucchi

Original Title	English Title	Director(s)	Year	Production Country
Catalogo N.3 - Odore Di Tiglio Intorno La Casa	Catalog N.3 - Smell of Linden Around the House	Yervant Gianikian, Angela Ricci Lucchi	1977	Italia
Film Perduto	Lost Movie	Yervant Gianikian, Angela Ricci Lucchi	2008	Italia

=== Open Doors ===
The 2010 Open Doors section was supported by the Swiss Foreign Ministry's Agency for Development and Cooperation. The section is meant to facilitate connections between directors and producers and co-production partners in Europe. This year Open Doors section focused on films from Central Asian.

Open Doors Screenings

Original Title	English Title	Director(s)	Year	Production Country
Altyn Kyrghol		Marat Sarulu	2001	Kazakhstan
Azghyin Ushtykzyn'Azaby	The Place on a Grey Tricorne	Ermek Shinarbayev	1993	Kazakhstan
Beshkempir		Aktan Arim Kubat	1998	Kyrgyzstan
Fararishtay Kifti Rost	Fyrishtay Kift Rost	Djamshed Usmonov	2002	Tadjikistan
Kaïrat		Darezhan Omirbaev	1991	Kazakhstan
Kelin	Bride	Ermek Tursunov	2009	Kazakhstan
Podarok Stalinu	Gift to Stalin	Rustem Abdrashev	2008	Kazakhstan
Povelitel Mukh	The Lord of the Flies	Vladimir Tyulkin	1990	Kazakhstan
Saratan	Cancer	Ernest Abdyjaparov	2005	Kyrgyzstan
Trassa	Trailer	Sergeï Dvortsevoy	1999	Kazakhstan
Voiz	Preacher	Yusup Razykov	1998	Uzbekistan
Yandym		Bayram Abdullayev, Lora Stepanskaya	1995	Turkmenistan

=== Leopards of Tomorrow ===
Leopards of Tomorrow (Pardi di Domani)

==== 20 Years of Leopards of Tomorrow ====
20 Years of Leopards of Tomorrow
Original Title	English Title	Director(s)	Year	Production Country
776 Km		Oleg Goncarjonok	1993	Belarus
All At Sea		Anna Negri	1994	Great Britain
Avant Le Petit Déjeuner	Before Breakfast	Cristi Puiu	1995	Switzerland
Caravan		Dag Mørk	2002	Norway
Die Frucht Deines Leibes	The Fruit of your Body	Barbara Albert	1996	Austria
Dies Irae	Day of Anger	Alexandre Astier	2003	France
Hotel Belgrad	Hotel Belgrade	Andrea Štaka	1998	Switzerland
Il Caricatore	The Charger	Eugenio Cappuccio, Massimo Gaudioso, Fabio Nunziata	1995	Italia
Jeux De Plage	Beach Games	Laurent Cantet	1995	France
L'Escalier	The Staircase	Frédéric Mermoud	2003	Switzerland
Le Songe D'Isaac	Isaac's Dream	Ursula Meier	1994	Belgium
Murder - They Said!		Misha Gyorik	1995	Switzerland
Still Life		Sima Urale	2001	New Zealand
The Last Good Breath		Kimberly Peirce	1993	USA
The Salesman And Other Adventures		Hannah Weyer	1994	USA
Tribu	Tribe	Joachim Lafosse	2001	Belgium
Valuri	Values	Adrian Sitaru	2007	Romania
West Bank Story		Ari Sandel	2006	USA
Zohra À La Plage	Zohra at the Beach	Catherine Bernstein	1995	France

==== International Competition ====
International Competition
Original title	English title	Director(s)	Year	Production country
2 Sisters		Rosa Gimatdinova	2009	Russia
8:05		Diego Castro	2010	Argentina
A History Of Mutual Respect		Gabriel Abrantes, Daniel Schmidt	2010	Portugal
Diarchia	Dearchy	Ferdinando Cito Filomarino	2010	Italia
Ensolorado	Sloping	Ricardo Targino	2010	Brazil
Far From Manhattan		Jacky Goldberg	2010	France
Gömböc		Ulrike Vahl	2010	Germany
Husk Meg I Morgen	Remember Me Tomorrow	Aasne Vaa Greibrokk	2010	Norway
Höstmannen	The Autumn Man	Jonas Selberg Augustsén	2010	Sweden
Jour Sans Joie	Joy	Nicolas Roy	2009	Canada
Khouya (Mon Frère)	Khouya (My Brother)	Yanis Koussim	2010	Algérie
Kid'S Play		CHOI Ju-yong	2009	South Korea
Little Angel		Suzi Jowsey Featherstone	2010	New Zealand
Morning Star		Jessica Lawton	2010	Australia
Pour Toi Je Ferai Bataille	For you I will Battle	Rachel Lang	2010	Belgium
Przez Szybe	Through the Glass	Igor Chojna	2009	Poland
Roxy		Shirley Petchprapa	2010	USA
Sabeel	Fool	Khalid Al Mahmood	2010	United Arab Emirates
Surgir! (L'Occident)	Arise! (the West)	Grégoire Letouvet	2009	France
The 3,651St Day		Mingxuan Zhu	2010	China
The Lost Explorer		Tim Walker	2010	Great Britain
Twelve Going On Sixty		Jonas Baeckeland	2010	Belgium
Until The River Runs Red		Paul Wright	2010	Great Britain
Za Ramkami	Behind the Frame	Max Ksjonda	2009	Ukraina
Â¿Te Vas?	Are you Going?	Cristina Molino	2010	Spain

==== National Competition ====
National Competition
Original title	English title	Director(s)	Year	Production country
Angela		David Maye	2010	Switzerland
Dürä..!	Dine ..!	Rolf Lang, Quinn Evan Reimann	2010	Switzerland
Elder Jackson		Robin Erard	2010	Switzerland
Fratelli	Brothers	Fabrizio Albertini	2010	Switzerland
Kwa Heri Mandima	Happy Mandima	Robert-Jan Lacombe	2010	Switzerland
L'Ami	Friend	Adrien Kuenzy	2010	Switzerland
Laterarius	Laterarium	Marina Rosset	2010	Switzerland
Le Miroir	The Mirror	Laurent Fauchère, Ramon & Pedro, Antoine Tinguely	2010	Switzerland
Lester		Pascal Forney	2010	Switzerland
Mak		Géraldine Zosso	2010	Switzerland
Reduit	Reduced	Carmen Stadler	2010	Switzerland
Schlaf	Sleep	Frank Braun, Claudius Gentinetta	2010	Switzerland
Störfaktor	Disruptive Factor	Manuel Wiedemann	2010	Switzerland
Yuri Lennon's Landing On Alpha 46		Anthony Vouardoux	2010	Switzerland

=== Retrospective – Ernst Lubitsch ===
Retrospective Ernst Lubitsch
English Title	Original Title	Director(s)	Year	Production Country
A Royal Scandal		Ernst Lubitsch, Otto Preminger	1945	USA
When I Was Dead	Als ich tot war	Ernst Lubitsch	1916	Germany
Angel		Ernst Lubitsch	1937	USA
Anna Boleyn		Ernst Lubitsch	1920	Germany
Bluebeard's Eighth Wife		Ernst Lubitsch	1938	USA
Carmen		Ernst Lubitsch	1918	Germany
Cluny Brown		Ernst Lubitsch	1946	USA
The Merry Jail	Das Fidele Gefängnis	Ernst Lubitsch	1917	Germany
The Loves of Pharaoh	Das Weib Des Pharao	Ernst Lubitsch	1921	Germany
The Blouse King	Der Blusenkönig	Ernst Lubitsch	1917	Germany
The Pride of the Company: The History of an Apprentice	Der Stolz Der Firma: Die Geschichte Eines Lehrlings	Carl Wilhelm	1914	Germany
Design for Living		Ernst Lubitsch	1933	USA
Desire		Frank Borzage	1936	USA
The Eyes of the Mummy Ma	Die Augen Der Mumie Ma	Ernst Lubitsch	1918	Germany
The Oyster Princess	Die Austernprinzessin	Ernst Lubitsch	1919	Germany
The Wildcat	Die Bergkatze	Ernst Lubitsch	1921	Germany
The Flame	Die Flamme	Ernst Lubitsch	1922	Germany
The Doll	Die Puppe	Ernst Lubitsch	1919	Germany
Ernst Lubitsch in Berlin		Robert Fischer	2006	Germany
Eternal Love		Ernst Lubitsch	1929	USA
Forbidden Paradise		Ernst Lubitsch	1924	USA
Heaven Can Wait		Ernst Lubitsch	1943	USA
I Don't Want to Be a Man	Ich Möchte Kein Mann Sein	Ernst Lubitsch	1918	Germany
If I Had A Million		James Cruze, H. Bruce Humberstone, Ernst Lubitsch, Norman Z. McLeod, Lothar Mendes, Stephen Roberts, William A. Seiter, Norman Taurog	1932	USA
Kohlhiesel's Daughters	Kohlhiesels Töchter	Ernst Lubitsch	1920	Germany
Lady Windermere's Fan		Ernst Lubitsch	1925	USA
Lubitsch, the Boss	Lubitsch, Le Patron	Jean-Jacques Bernard, Nguyen Trong Binh	2010	France
Madame Dubarry		Ernst Lubitsch	1919	Germany
Meyer from Berlin	Meyer Aus Berlin	Ernst Lubitsch	1918	Germany
Monte Carlo		Ernst Lubitsch	1930	USA
Ninotchka		Ernst Lubitsch	1939	USA
One Hour With You		George Cukor, Ernst Lubitsch	1932	USA
Paramount On Parade		Dorothy Arzner, Otto Brower, Edmund Goulding, Victor Heerman, Edwin H. Knopf, Rowland V. Lee, Ernst Lubitsch, Lothar Mendes, Victor Schertzinger, A. Edward Sutherland, Frank Tuttle	1930	USA
Romeo and Juliet in the Snow	Romeo Und Julia Im Schnee	Ernst Lubitsch	1920	Germany
Rosita		Ernst Lubitsch	1923	USA
Shoe Palace Pinkus	Schuhpalast Pinkus	Ernst Lubitsch	1916	Germany
So This Is Paris		Ernst Lubitsch	1926	USA
One Arabian Night	Sumurun	Ernst Lubitsch	1920	Germany
That Lady in Ermine		Ernst Lubitsch, Otto Preminger	1948	USA
That Uncertain Feeling		Ernst Lubitsch	1941	USA
The Love Parade		Ernst Lubitsch	1929	USA
The Man I Killed		Ernst Lubitsch	1931	USA
The Marriage Circle		Ernst Lubitsch	1924	USA
The Merry Widow		Ernst Lubitsch	1934	USA
The Patriot		Ernst Lubitsch	1928	USA
The Shop Around the Corner		Ernst Lubitsch	1940	USA
The Smiling Lieutenant		Ernst Lubitsch	1931	USA
The Student Prince in Old Heidelberg		Ernst Lubitsch, John M. Stahl	1927	USA
Three Women		Ernst Lubitsch	1924	USA
To Be or Not to Be		Ernst Lubitsch	1942	USA
Trouble in Paradise		Ernst Lubitsch	1932	USA
When Four Do the Same	Wenn Vier Dasselbe Tun	Ernst Lubitsch	1917	Germany

=== Author's Shorts ===
Original Title	English Title	Director(s)	Year	Production Country
Armandino E Il Madre	Armandino and the Mother	Valeria Golino	2010	Italia
Kataï		Claire Doyon	2010	France
Laharog Dvora	By Light	Tal Granit, Sharon Maymon	2009	Israel
Nem Marcha Nem Chouta	Not Marcha is not Chouuta	Helvécio Marins Jr	2009	Brazil
Tales		Saskia Gruyaert, Raya Martin, Antoine Thirion	2010	France
Todos Iguais A Dormir	All the Same to Sleep	Jeanne Waltz	2010	Portugal

=== Juries Film ===
English Title	Original Title	Director(s)	Year	Production Country
The Face You Deserve	A Cara Que Mereces	Miguel Gomes	2004	Portugal
Everyone Else	Alle Anderen	Maren Ade	2009	Germany
Accomplices	Complices	Frédéric Mermoud	2009	France
About Elly	Darbareye Elly	Asghar Farhadi	2009	Iran
Private Lessons	Elève Libre	Joachim Lafosse	2008	Belgium
Go Get Some Rosemary		Benny Safdie, Josh Safdie	2009	USA
Freedom	La Libertad	Lisandro Alonso	2001	Argentina
The Parade (Our History)	La Parade (Notre Histoire)	Lionel Baier	2001	Switzerland
The King of Escape	Le Roi De L'Évasion	Alain Guiraudie	2009	France
Los Angeles Plays Itself		Thom Andersen	2003	USA
My Magic		Eric Khoo	2008	Singapour
Police, Adjective	Poliţist, Adjectiv	Corneliu Porumboiu	2009	Romania
Santa Maradona		Marco Ponti	2001	Italia

=== Pardo of Honor ===
==== Alain Tanner ====
Original Title	English Title	Director(s)	Year	Production Country
Dans La Ville Blanche	In the White City	Alain Tanner	1983	Portugal
Jonas Qui Aura 25 Ans En L'An 2000	Jonah Who Will Be 25 in the Year 2000	Alain Tanner	1976	Switzerland
Les Années Lumière	Light Years	Alain Tanner	1981	Switzerland
Paul S'En Va	Paul Leaves	Alain Tanner	2004	Switzerland

==== Jia Zhang-ke ====
Original Title	English Title	Director(s)	Year	Production Country
Hai Shang Chuan Qi		Jia Zhangke	2010	China
Zhantai		Jia Zhangke	2000	China

=== Excellence Award ===
Original Title	English Title	Director(s)	Year	Production Country
Non Ma Fille, Tu N'Iras Pas Danser	No My Daughter, you Won't Go Dancing	Christophe Honoré	2009	France

=== Raimondo Rezzonico Prize ===
Raimondo Rezzonico Prize To the Best Independent Manufacturer
Original Title	English Title	Director(s)	Year	Production Country
Love Streams		John Cassavetes	1984	USA
Operation Thunderbolt		Menahem Golan	1977	Israel
Runaway Train		Andrei Konchalovsky	1985	USA
The Magician of Lublin		Menahem Golan	1979	Israel

=== Swiss Cinema Rediscovered ===
Special Events - Swiss Cinema Rediscovered
Original Title	English Title	Director(s)	Year	Production Country
Anne Bäbi Jowäger		Franz Schnyder	1960	Switzerland
L'Oasis Dans La Tourmente	Oasis in Turmoil	Arthur Porchet	1941	Switzerland

=== Special Programs ===
Corso Salani
Original Title	English Title	Director(s)	Year	Production Country
Gli Occhi Stanchi	The Tired Eyes	Corso Salani	1996	Italia
I Casi Della Vita, Episodio Konakovo, Russia	The Cases of Life, Episode Konakovo, Russia	Corso Salani	2010	Italia
I Casi Della Vita, Episodio Siracusa, Italia	The Cases of Life, Episode Siracusa, Italy	Corso Salani	2010	Italia
John C. Reilly
Boogie Nights		Paul Thomas Anderson	1997	USA
Hard Eight		Paul Thomas Anderson	1996	USA
Step Brothers		Adam McKay	2008	USA
Walk Hard: The Dewey Cox Story		Jake Kasdan	2007	USA
Philippe Parreno
Credits		Philippe Parreno	1999	France
El Sueño De Una Cosa	The Dream of a Thing	Philippe Parreno	2001	France
Invisibleboy		Philippe Parreno	2010	France
June 8, 1968		Philippe Parreno	2009	France
Stories Are Propaganda		Philippe Parreno	2005	France
The Boy From Mars		Philippe Parreno	2003	France
Zidane, Un Portrait Du 21Ème Siècle	Zidane, a Portrait of the 21st Century	Douglas Gordon, Philippe Parreno	2006	France
Michel Soutter
James Ou Pas	James or not	Michel Soutter	1970	Switzerland
Rainer Werner Fassbinder
Ich Will Doch Nur, Dass Ihr Mich Liebt	I Just Want you to Love Me	Rainer Werner Fassbinder	1976	Germany
Rogério Sganzerla
B2		Rogério Sganzerla	2001	Brazil
O Bandido Da Luz Vermelha	The Red Light Bandit	Rogério Sganzerla	1968	Brazil
Bernardo Bertolucci
Il Canale	The Channel	Bernardo Bertolucci	1966	Italia

== Parallel Sections ==
=== Critics Week ===
The Semaine de la Critique is an independent section, created in 1990 by the Swiss Association of Film Journalists in partnership with the Locarno Film Festival.

Original Title	English Title	Director(s)	Production Country
Article 12 - Waking Up In A Surveillance Society		Juan Manuel Biaiñ	Great Britain
Auf Wiedersehen Finnland	Goodbye Finland	Virpi Suutari	Finland
Blood Calls You		Linda Thorgren	Sweden
Das Schiff Des Torjägers	The Scorer Ship	Heidi Specogna	Germany
Reindeerspotting: Escape from Santaland		Joonas Neuvonen	Finland
Summer Pasture		Lynn True, Nelson Walker	USA
The Furious Force Of Rhymes		joshua Litle	France

=== Appellation Swiss ===
Original Title	English Title	Director(s)	Year	Production Country
Aisheen (Still Alive In Gaza)		Nicolas Wadimoff	2009	Switzerland
Bödälä - Dance The Rhythm		Gitta Gsell	2010	Switzerland
Coeur Animal	Animal Heart	Séverine Cornamusaz	2009	Switzerland
Cosa Voglio Di Più	What I Want more	Silvio Soldini	2009	Italia
Der Fürsorger	The Carer	Lutz Konermann	2009	Switzerland
Film Socialisme	Film Socialism	Jean-Luc Godard	2010	Switzerland
Guru - Bhagwan, His Secretary & His Bodyguard		Sabine Gisiger, Beat Häner	2010	Switzerland
Il Nuovo Sud Dell'Italia	The New South of Italy	Pino Esposito	2010	Switzerland
Miramare		Michaela Mueller	2009	Croatia
Pepperminta		Pipilotti Rist	2009	Switzerland
Romans D'Ados 1 - La Fin De L’Innocence	Teen Novels 1 - The End of Innocence	Béatrice Bakhti	2010	Switzerland
Romans D'Ados 2 - La Crise	Teen Novels 2 - The Crisis	Béatrice Bakhti	2010	Switzerland
Romans D'Ados 3 - Les Illusions Perdues	Teen Novels 3 - Lost Illusions	Béatrice Bakhti	2010	Switzerland
Romans D'Ados 4 - Adulte Mais Pas Trop	Teen Novels 4 - Adult but not Too Much	Béatrice Bakhti	2010	Switzerland
Romans D'Ados		Béatrice Bakhti		Switzerland
Space Tourists		Christian Frei	2009	Switzerland
Tannöd		Bettina Oberli	2009	Germany
Valise	Suitcase	Isabelle Favez	2009	Switzerland

== Official Awards ==
=== International Competition (Concorso Internazionale) ===
- Pardo d'oro: Han Jia directed by Li Hongqi
- Pardo per la miglior interpretazione maschile (Best actress): Jasna Duri in Beli Beli Svet
- Pardo per la miglior interpretazione maschile (Best actor): Emmanuel Bilodeau in Curling
- Pardo per la miglior regia (Best director): Denis Côté for CURLING
- Special Jury Prize: Morgen directed by Marian Crisan

=== Filmmakers of the Present Competition (Concorso Cineasti del presente) ===
- Pardo d'oro Cineasti del presente: Paraboles by Emmanuelle Demoris
- Special CINÉ CINÉMA Jury Prize: Foreign Parts directed by J. P. Sniadecki and Verena Paravel
- Special Mention: Ivory Tower directed by Adam Traynor

=== Leopards of Tomorrow (Pardi di Domani) ===
- Pardino d’oro for the Best International Short Film: A History Of Mutual Respect directed by Daniel Schmidt and Gabriel Abrantes
- Pardino d’argento, International Competition: Pour Toi Je Ferai Bataille directed by Rachel Lang
- Locarno short film nominee for the European Film Awards: Diarchia directed by Ferdinando Cito Filomarino
- Film und Video Untertitelung Prize: Höstmannen directed by Jonas Selberg Augustsén
- Pardino d’oro for the Best Swiss Short Film: Kwa Heri Mandima directed by Robert-Jan Lacombe
- Pardino d’argento, Swiss competition: Yuri Lennon’s Landing On Alpha 46 directed by Anthony Vouardoux
- Action Light Prize for Best Swiss Newcomer: Angela directed by David Maye

=== Piazza Grande ===
- Prix du Public UBS: The Human Resources Manager directed by Eran Riklis
- Variety Piazza Grande Award: Rare Exports: A Christmas Tale directed by Jalmari Helander

=== Cinema e Gioventù Jury, Pardi di domani ===
- Cinema e Gioventù Prize, international competition: Khouya (Mon FRÈRE) directed by Yanis Koussim
- Cinema e Gioventù Prize, Swiss competition: Yuri Lennon’s Landing On Alpha 46 directed by Anthony Vouardoux
- Special Mention, International competition: ¿Te Vas? directed by Cristina Molino

=== Youth Jury ===
- First Prize: Karamay directed by XU Xin
- Second Prize: Pietro directed by Daniele Gaglianone
- Third Prize: Morgen directed by Marian Crisan
- “Environnement is the quality of life” Prize: Womb directed by Benedej Fliegauf

=== Ecumenical Jury ===
- Ecumenical Award: Morgen directed by Marian Crisan
- Ecumenical special mention: Karamay directed by Xu Xin, Han Jia directed by Li Hongqi

=== FIPRESCI Jury ===
- FIPRESCI Prize: Han Jia directed by Li Hongqi
- FIPRESCI Special Mention: Karamay directed by XU Xin

=== CICAE Jury ===
- Art & Essai CICAE Prize: Beli Beli Svet directed by Oleg Novkovic

=== FICC/IFFS ===
- Don Quijote Prize: Morgen directed by Marian Crisan
- FICC/IFFS Spetial Mention: Karamay directed by XU Xin

=== SRG SSR idée suisse / Critics Week 2010 Jury ===
- SRG SSR idée suisse / Critics Week 2010 Special mention: The Furious Force Of Rhymes directed by Joshua Litle, Blood Calls You directed by Linda Thorgren
- SRG SSR idée suisse / Critics Week 2010 Prize: Reindeer Spotting – Escape From Santaland directed by Joonas Neuvonen
