= 46th Locarno Film Festival =

Film festival in Locarno, Switzerland

- Location: Locarno, Switzerland
- Founded: 1946
- Awards: Golden Leopard: The Place on a Grey Tricorne directed by Ermek Shinarbayev
- Artistic director: Marco Mueller
- No. of films: Over 200 screened In Competition: 22 (17 World Premieres)
- Festival date: Opening: 5 August 1993; Closing: 15 August 1993
- Website: LFF

Locarno Film Festival
- 47th 45th

The 46th Locarno Film Festival was held from 5 to 15 August 1993 in Locarno, Switzerland. The competition featured 22 film all of which had international premieres, with 17 out of 22 being world premieres. Samuel Fuller was award the Leopard of Honor, for his lifetime achievement in the film industry. A retrospective of Sasha Guitry was held and, in total, the festival screened over 200 films. As was custom to accommodate the international jury, the films in competition were screened with four language translations simultaneously.

The Chinese government tried to stop Locarno from screening the independent film Beijing Bastard directed by Zhang Yuan. The film was described as the first Chinese youth culture rock-and-roll picture. The Chinese government felt it could ban the film outside and inside China, despite the fact that the film was financed in Hong Kong, saying it had not approved the script and it was shot inside the country. Artistic director Marco Mueller declined the government's request and Beijing Bastard had its world premiere at Locarno. In response, the Chinese government pulled the Chinese film An Innocent Babbler from the festival and gave it to the Venice festival.

A restored print of Bernardo Bertolucci's The Conformist was shown on the Piazza Grande, the festival's 6,500 seat open-air theatre, to a full house. Bertolucci presented the film himself and seem stunted at the size of the crowd and said he'd love to show more films at Locarno.

The Golden Leopard, the festival's top prize, was awarded to The Place on a Grey Tricorne directed by Ermek Shinarbayev.

== Jury ==
- Oliver Assayas, French director
- Valeria Golino, Italian actress
- Francesco Clemente, Italian critic and painter
- Kathryn Bigelow, American director

== Official Sections 1993 ==
The following films were screened in these sections:

=== Piazza Grande ===
Piazza Grande

| English Title | Original Title | Director(s) | Year | Production Country |
|---|---|---|---|---|
| Forty Guns | | Samuel Fuller | 1957 | USA |
| The Conformist | Il Conformista | Bernardo Bertolucci | 1970 | Italia, Germany |
| The Great Pumpkin | Il Grande Cocomero | Francesca Archibugi | 1993 | Italia, France |
| Libera | | Pappi Corsicato | 1993 | Italia |
| My Crazy Life | Mi Vida Loca | Allison Anders | 1993 | USA |
| Oh... Rosalinda!! | | Michael Powell, Emeric Pressburger | 1955 | Great Britain |
| Raining Stones | | Ken Loach | 1993 | Great Britain |
| Shimmer | | John Hanson | 1993 | USA |
| Sleepless In Seattle | | Nora Ephron | 1993 | USA |
| Man Down | Un Homme À La Mer | Jacques Doillon | 1993 | France |
| The Puppetmaster | Ximeng Rensheng | Hou Hsiao-Hsien | 1993 | Taiwan |
| The Wedding Banquet | | Ang Lee | 1993 | Taiwan, USA |

=== Main Competition ===
Feature films

| Original Title | English Title | Director(s) | Year | Production Country |
|---|---|---|---|---|
| Au Nom Du Christ | In the Name of Christ | Roger Gnoan M'Bala | 1993 | Ivory Coast, Switzerland |
| Azghyin Ushtykzyn' Azaby | | Yermek Shinarbayev | 1993 | Kazakhstan |
| Beijing Zazhong | Beijing Za | Zhang Yuan | 1993 | Hong Kong |
| Bhaji On The Beach | | Gurinder Chadha | 1993 | Great Britain |
| Dazed And Confused | | Richard Linklater | 1993 | USA |
| Hartverscheurend | Love Hurts | Mijke de Jong | 1993 | Netherlands |
| Kaspar Hauser - Verbrechen Am Seelenleben Eines Menschen | Kaspar Hauser - Crimes in a Person's Soul Life | Peter Sehr | 1993 | Germany |
| Korazu Zaru | Coraza Branches | Kenchi Iwamoto | 1993 | Japan |
| L'Ecrivain Public | Public Writer | Jean-François Amiguet | 1993 | Switzerland, France |
| L'Ordre Du Jour | The Agenda | Michael Khleifi | 1993 | Belgium, France |
| La Ribelle | The Rebel | Aurelio Grimaldi | 1993 | Italia |
| La Rusna Pearsa | | Dino Simonett | 1993 | Switzerland, Germany |
| La Vida Conyugal | Conjugal Life | Carlos Carrera | 1992 | Mexico |
| Les Gents Normaux N'Ont Rien D'Exceptionnel | Normal People are not Exceptional | Laurence Ferreira-Barbosa | 1993 | France |
| Ludwig 1881 | | Fosco Dubini, Donatello Dubini | 1993 | Switzerland, Germany |
| Marcides | Mercedes | Yousry Nasrallah | 1993 | Egypt, France |
| Travolta Et Moi | Travolta you Wicked Hi | Patricia Mazuy | 1993 | France |
| Two Small Bodies | | Beth B. | 1993 | Germany, USA |
| Veleno | Poison | Bruno Bigoni | 1993 | Italia |
| When Pigs Fly | | Sara Driver | 1993 | USA, Germany |
| Zghvardze | | Dito Tsintsadze Tsintsadze | 1993 | Georgia |
| Zhiyao Wei Ni Huo Yitian | Z Hi Medicine Wei NIH UO Y i Day | Chen Guofu | 1993 | Taiwan |

=== Leopards of Tomorrow ===
The Leopards of Tomorrow (Pardi di Domani) section featured a collection of short and medium length films from around the world.

CEI Short Films In Competition
| Original Title | English Title | Director(s) | Year | Production Country |
|---|---|---|---|---|
| 776 Km | | Oleg Goncarjonok | 1993 | Belarus |
| Avlos | Intangible | Asatrjan Alik Remikovic | 1992 | Armenia |
| Ballada O Lese | Ballada or Lese | Fedor Dobrikov | 1993 | Russia |
| Denikin | Denick | Janya Kalinitenko | 1992 | Russia |
| Dzado | Dado | Gorgij Paradzanov | 1993 | Russia |
| Gorjacij Kamen | Gorgeous Stone | Sergeij Jourdin | 1993 | Russia |
| Granitsa Na Zamke | The Border on the Castle | Sergei Lysenko | 1989 | Ukraina |
| Hai, Murgule, Hai | Is, Mugula, is | Vadim Prodan | 1993 | Moldova |
| Igra V Klassiki | Game of Classics | Valery Pugaskin | 1993 | Russia |
| Incipit Vita Nova | Begins with New Life | Hardi Volmer | 1992 | Estonia |
| Ja Veru | I Believe | Martin Tannenberg | 1992 | Russia |
| Kain | | Vladimir Dychenko, Fyodor Muskarin | 1992 | Ukraina |
| Mama Esli By Ja Vernulsja | Mom if I Returned | Bakir Sharifovic Kabulov | 1991 | Russia, Russia |
| Nekrasivaja | Non -Kicking | Alexandre Grokov | 1992 | Russia |
| Neregiu | I Don't See | Audris Stonys | 1991 | Lithuania |
| Niekam Nesakyk | Don't Tell Anyone | Arvydas Lebeliunas | 1991 | Lithuania |
| Octobre | October | Abderrahmane Sissako | 1993 | Russia |
| Odin | | Natalia Kalasnikova | 1992 | Russia |
| Prelude | | Marc Zviguisky | 1992 | Russia |
| Pro Olju V Nevole | Pro Oils in Nevole | Segy Lepichin, Pavel Pecenkin | 1992 | Russia |
| Psalom | Psalm | Alexandre Gorjajnov | 1993 | Russia |
| Rudens Sniegas | Autumn Snow | Valdas Navasaitis | 1992 | Lithuania |
| Sashobao Dgiuri | Sadobao D Technique Sales | Gujabidse Ketevan | 1993 | Georgia |
| Sel' Kincek | Flood 'Kinkcek | Aktan Abdykalykov | 1993 | Kyrgyzstan |
| Son Gospodina Ekonomidi | The Dream of Mr. Economics | Evgueniy Krylov | 1993 | Russia |
| Telo Lenina | Lenin's Body | Vitalij Manskij | 1992 | Russia |
| Ten 'Mal'Cika | Ten 'Greek | Timur Sulejmenov | 1992 | Kazakhstan |
| Trava I Voda | Grass and Water | Viktor Tichamirov | 1992 | Russia |
| Tuckap, Stat Tamov | Tuckap, State Tamov | Andrey Karpenko | 1991 | Russia |
| Umbre | SHADOWS | Constantin Munteanu | 1993 | Moldova |
| Utrom Sel Sneg | In the Morning the Snow Sat Down | Sergej Vinokurov | 1993 | Russia |
| Vientule Minna | Lonely Minna | Renâte Câne | 1992 | Russia |
CISA Special Program
| Tweed | | Etudiants CISA | 1993 | Switzerland |
DAVI Special Program
| Au Fond Du Jardin | At the Bottom of the Garden | Hélène Faucherre | 1993 | Switzerland |
| Faim | Hunger | Fulvio Bernasconi | 1993 | Switzerland |
| Les Mesaventures Du Jabot | Jobot's Measurements | Isabelle Blanc | 1993 | Switzerland |
| Nuit Blanche | White | Séverine Schellenberg | 1993 | Switzerland |
| Papillon | | Janine Waeber | 1993 | Switzerland |
| Qui C'Est Pour Un | Who is for a | Thomas Thümena | 1993 | Switzerland |
| S'Tröimli | | Hobby-Blobi-Lobby | 1993 | Switzerland |
| Schach | Chess | Gaby Schaedler | 1993 | Switzerland |
Short Swiss Films In Competition
| Bowling | | Michael Huber | 1993 | Switzerland |
| Conduite Interieure | Interior Conduct | Antoine Panevin | 1993 | Switzerland |
| Damit Die Zeita Nicht Stehen Bleibt | So that the Time Does not Stop | Yingli Ma, Angela Meschini | 1993 | Switzerland, Germany |
| Fait Divers | Diverse | Grégoire Baer | 1993 | Switzerland |
| Game Over | | | 1993 | Switzerland |
| Jack Steiner Ou Le Voyageur Immobile | Jack Steiner or the Motionless Traveler | Christian Jacquenot, Jean Marc Pasquet | 1993 | Switzerland |
| La Locomotive | Locomotive | Nicolas Dufour, Wolfgang Fels | 1993 | Switzerland |
| La Sposa Contenta | The Bride Happy | Elda Guidinetti | 1993 | Switzerland |
| Le Jardin D'Eden | The Garden of Eden | Juliette Frey | 1992 | Switzerland, Belgium |
| Leopold | | Mamouda Zekrya | 1993 | Switzerland |
| Liber Pater | | Pascal Baumgartner | 1992 | Switzerland |
| Liquid Assets | | François Rossier | 1993 | Switzerland |
| Mersal El Hawa | Marsal Hawa | Elie Khalifé | 1993 | Switzerland |
| Michu | | Denis Rabaglia | 1992 | Switzerland |
| Zap | | Lorenzo Gabriele | 1993 | Switzerland |
Special ESAV Program
| Cut | | Patricia Nydegger | 1993 | Switzerland |
| La Synarchie | Synarchy | Patrick Riggenberger | 1993 | Switzerland |
| November Am Meer | November Am more | Romed Wyder | 1993 | Switzerland |
| Triptyque De Nuit | Night Triptych | Marion Walthert | 1993 | Switzerland |
Special Program - School of Design (Bern)
| A Wie Abelin | A Like Abelin | Judith Rutishauser | 1993 | Switzerland |
| Das Panama-Projekt | The Panama Project | Felix Schaad | 1993 | Switzerland |
| Kilroy | | Daniel Kölliker | 1993 | Switzerland |
| Skaters | | Stéphan Bossert, Séverine Schellenberg | 1993 | Switzerland |
Vietnamese Short Films
| Ban Toi | Ban My | Trinh Le Van | 1992 | Vietnam |
| Chi Dung | | Madame Dung | 1992 | Vietnam |
| Chu Be Cu-Li | C Hub ECU-l i | Pham Nhue Gang | 1992 | Vietnam |
| Ha Noi Co Cau Long Bien | Ha Noi Co Cau Long Well | Pham Cuong | 1992 | Vietnam |

=== Cinema ===
Cinema/Cinemas
| Original Title | English Title | Director(s) | Year | Production Country |
|---|---|---|---|---|
| Chahine And Co. | Want and CO. | Jean-Louis Comolli | 1993 | France |
| De Domeinen Ditvoorst | The Domains Ditvoorst | Thom Hoffman | 1992 | Netherlands |
| Le Tombeau D'Alexandre | Alexander's Tomb | Chris Marker | 1993 | France |
| Oliveira L'Architecte | Oliveira the Architect | Paulo Rocha | 1993 | France |
| Ostrov Mjertvich' | The Island of Dead ' | Oleg Kovalov | 1992 | Russia |
| Pasolini L'Enragé | Pasolini the Enraged | Jean-André Fieschi | 1966 | France |
| Scast'E | | Aleksandr Medvedkin | 1934 | Russia |
| The Scorsese Machine | | André S. Labarthe | 1991 | France |

=== Film Surprise ===
| Original Title | English Title | Director(s) | Year | Production Country |
|---|---|---|---|---|
| Chtchedroïe | Chedroïe | Boris Barnet | 1950 | Russia |

=== Out of Program ===
| Original Title | English Title | Director(s) | Year | Production Country |
|---|---|---|---|---|
| Asmara | | Paolo Poloni | 1993 | Switzerland |
| Roi Blanc, Dame Rouge | White King, Red Lady | Segueï Bodrov | 1992 | Switzerland, Russia |

=== Cinema Rediscovered – Valerio Zurlini ===
Valerio Zurlini (Cinema Ritrovato)
| Original Title | English Title | Director(s) | Year | Production Country |
|---|---|---|---|---|
| Cronaca Familiare | Family Diary | Valerio Zurlini | 1962 | Italia |
| Estate Violenta | Violent Summer | Valerio Zurlini | 1959 | Italia, France |
| Il Deserto Dei Tartari | The Tartar Desert | Valerio Zurlini | 1976 | Italia, France |
| La Prima Notte Di Quiete | The First Night of Quiet | Valerio Zurlini | 1972 | Italia, France |
| La Ragazza Con La Valigia | The Girl with the Suitcase | Valerio Zurlini | 1961 | Italia, France |
| Le Ragazze Di San Frediano | The Girls of San Frediano | Valerio Zurlini | 1954 | Italia |
| Le Soldatesse | The Camp Followers | Valerio Zurlini | 1965 | Italia, France |
| Seduto Alla Sua Destra | Black Jesus | Valerio Zurlini | 1968 | Italia |

=== Retrospective – Sacha Guitry ===
| Original Title | English Title | Director(s) | Year | Production Country |
|---|---|---|---|---|
| Assassins Et Voleurs | Assassins and Thieves | Sacha Guitry | 1956 | France |
| Aux Deux Colombes | Two Doves | Sacha Guitry | 1949 | France |
| Bonne Chance! | Good Luck! | Sacha Guitry | 1935 | France |
| Ceux De Chez Nous | Those from Home | Sacha Guitry | 1914 | France |
| Cinéaste De Notre Temps S'Il En Fût: Sacha Guitry | Filmmaker of Our Time if it Was: Sacha Guitry | Claude de Gvray | 1964 | France |
| Debureau | Debate | Sacha Guitry | 1950 | France |
| Donne-Moi Tes Yeux | Give Me your Eyes | Sacha Guitry | 1943 | France |
| Désiré | Desired | Sacha Guitry | 1938 | France |
| Faisons Un Rêve | Let's Have a Dream | Sacha Guitry | 1936 | France |
| Ils Étaient Neuf Célibataires | They Were Nine Singles | Sacha Guitry | 1939 | France |
| Je L'Ai Été Trois Fois | I Was Three Times | Sacha Guitry | 1952 | France |
| La Malibran | La Breit | Sacha Guitry | 1944 | France |
| La Poison | | Sacha Guitry | 1951 | France |
| La Vie D'Un Honnête Homme | The Life of an Honest Man | Sacha Guitry | 1952 | France |
| Le Comédien | The Actor | Sacha Guitry | 1947 | France |
| Le Destin Fabuleux De Désirée Clary | The Fabulous Fate of Désirée Clary | Sacha Guitry | 1941 | France |
| Le Diable Boiteux | The Lame Devil | Sacha Guitry | 1948 | France |
| Le Mot De Cambronne | The Word Cambronne | Sacha Guitry | 1936 | France |
| Le Nouveau Testament | The New Testament | Sacha Guitry | 1936 | France |
| Le Roman D'Un Tricheur | The Novel of a Cheater | Sacha Guitry | 1936 | France |
| Le Trésor De Cantenac | The Treasure of Cantenac | Sacha Guitry | 1950 | France |
| Les Perles De La Couronne | The Pearls of the Crown | Sacha Guitry | 1937 | France |
| Les Trois Font La Paire | The Three Make the Pair | Sacha Guitry | 1957 | France |
| Mcdxxix-Mcmxlii (De Jeanne D'Arc A Philippe Petain) | T | Sacha Guitry | 1944 | France |
| Mon Père Avait Raison | My Father Was Right | Sacha Guitry | 1936 | France |
| Napoléon | Napoleon | Sacha Guitry | 1954 | France |
| Pasteur | | Sacha Guitry | 1935 | France |
| Quadrille | | Sacha Guitry | 1938 | France |
| Remontons Les Champs-Élysées | Let's Go Back the Champs-Élysées | Sacha Guitry | 1938 | France |
| Si Paris Nous Était Conté! | If Paris Was Told to Us! | Sacha Guitry | 1955 | France |
| Si Versailles M'Était Conté | Royal Affairs in Versailles | Sacha Guitry | 1953 | France |
| Toâ | | Sacha Guitry | 1949 | France |
| Tu M'As Sauvé La Vie | You Saved My Life | Sacha Guitry | 1951 | France |

==== Unpublished Films By Sacha Guitry ====
| Original Title | English Title | Director(s) | Year | Production Country |
|---|---|---|---|---|
| Arrivee Chez Sacha Guitry | Arrival at Sacha Guitry | Sacha Guitry | | France |
| Dîner De Gala Des Ambassadeurs | Ambassadors' Gala Dinner | Sacha Guitry | 1934 | France |
| Faisons Un Rêve - Essais D'Acteurs | Let's Have a Dream - Essays of Actors | Sacha Guitry | 1936 | France |
| Film De Famille Avec Lucien Guitry | Family Film with Lucien Guitry | Sacha Guitry | | France |
| Le Comedien - Essais D'Acteurs | The Comedian - Actors of Actors | Sacha Guitry | 1947 | France |
| Mariage - Sortie De L'Eglise | Wedding - Exit of the Church | Sacha Guitry | 1939 | France |
| Oscar Rencontre Mademoiselle Mamageot | Oscar Meets Mademoiselle Mamageot | Sacha Guitry | | France |
| Pique-Nique En Ete | Summer Picnic | Sacha Guitry | | France |

=== Special Programs ===
Special Program
| Original Title | English Title | Director(s) | Year | Production Country |
|---|---|---|---|---|
| A Tremonha De Cristal | The Crystal Tremon | Antonio Campos | 1993 | Portugal |
| Bris Tval | | Ingmar Bergman | 1951 | Sweden |
| D'Est | From the East | Chantal Akerman | 1993 | France, Belgium |
| Dva Kapitana Ii | Two Captains and | Sergeij Debizhev | 1992 | Russia, Germany |
| Filmforetallningen | The Film Forward | Ingmar Bergman | 1951 | Sweden |
| Filminspelningen | Film Recording | Ingmar Bergman | 1951 | Sweden |
| Gustav Iii | | Ingmar Bergman | 1951 | Sweden |
| I Am A Sex Addict | | Vikram Jayanti, John Powers | 1993 | USA |
| L'Arbre, Le Maire Et La Mediathèque | The Tree, the Mayor and the Media Library | Éric Rohmer | 1993 | France |
| Le Journal De Lady M. | The Journal of Lady M. | Alain Tanner | 1993 | Switzerland, Belgium |
| Magisk Teater | Magic Theater | Ingmar Bergman | 1951 | Sweden |
| Perlicki Na Dne | Perlicki on the Day | Juray Herz, Ivan Passer | 1965 | Czech Republic |
| Prinsessan Och Svinaherden | Princess and the Swine | Ingmar Bergman | 1951 | Sweden |
| Rebusen | Rev Battle | Ingmar Bergman | 1951 | Sweden |
| Sottovoce | Sub -Put | Claudio Pazienza | 1993 | Belgium, France |
| Trolleriforestallning | Trollfoestalling | Ingmar Bergman | 1951 | Sweden |
| Uppfinnaren | The Inventor | Ingmar Bergman | 1951 | Sweden |
| Zefiro | Zephyr | José Álvaro Morais | 1993 | Portugal |

== Independent Sections ==
=== Critics Week ===
The Semaine de la Critique is an independent section, created in 1990 by the Swiss Association of Film Journalists in partnership with the Locarno Film Festival.

| Original Title | English Title | Director(s) | Year | Production Country |
|---|---|---|---|---|
| Aileen Wournos: The Selling Of A Serial Killer | | Nick Broomfield | 1992 | USA |
| Babylon 2 | | Trinh Le Van | 1993 | Switzerland |
| Bewogen Koper | Merging Copper | Johan van der van der Keuken | 1993 | Netherlands |
| La Veritable Histoire D'Artaud Le Momo | The Real Story of Artaud Le Momo | Gérard Mordillat, Jérôme Prieur | 1993 | France |
| Lyrische Suite-Das Untergehende Vaterland | Lyrical Suite Das Undertaking Fatherland | Harald Bergmann | 1993 | Germany |
| Pechblende | | Volker Koepp | 1992 | Germany |
| Starting Place-Point De Depart | | Robert Kramer | 1993 | France |
| Tanz Der Blauen Vögel | Dance of the Blue Birds | Lisa Fässler | 1993 | Switzerland |

=== Swiss Cinema ===
Swiss Cinema Rediscovered
| Original Title | English Title | Director(s) | Year | Production Country |
|---|---|---|---|---|
| Uli Der Knecht | Uli the Servant | Franz Schnyder | 1954 | Switzerland |
| Uli Der Pächter | Uli the Tenant | Franz Schnyder | 1955 | Switzerland |
| Visages D'Enfants | Children's Faces | Jacques Feyder | 1923 | Switzerland, France |
New Swiss Movies '93
| Benno Besson, L'Ami Etranger | Benno Besson, the Foreigner Friend | Philippe Macasdar | 1993 | Switzerland, Germany |
| Die Bösen Buben | The Bad Boys | Bruno Moll | 1993 | Switzerland |
| Die Insel | The Island | Martin Schaub | 1993 | Switzerland |
| En Voyage Avec Jean Mohr | Traveling with Jean Mohr | Villi Hermann | 1992 | Switzerland |
| Le Hibou Et La Baleine, Nicolas Bouvier | The Owl and the Whale, Nicolas Bouvier | Patricia Plattner | 1993 | Switzerland |
| Rund Um Die Liebe | Around Love | Ueli Mamin | 1992 | Switzerland |
| Terra Prometida (Gelobtes Land) | Terra Promentidida (Land) | Peter von Gunten | 1992 | Switzerland |
| Transit Uri | Transit | Dieter Gränicher | 1993 | Switzerland |
| Ur-Musig | UR Music | Cyrill Schläpfer | 1993 | Switzerland |
| Vivre Avec | Live | | 1993 | Switzerland |
| Zärtliche Erpresserin | Tender Blackmail | Beat Lottaz | 1992 | Switzerland, Germany |

== Official Awards ==
=== Official Jury ===
- Golden Leopard: Azghyin USHTYKZYN’ AZABY by Ermek Shinarbayev
- Silver Leopard: Zghvardze by Dito Tsintsadze
- Bronze Leopard: Travolta Et Moi by Patricia Mazuy, Valeria Bruni Tedeschi in LES GENTS NORMAUX N’ONT RIEN D’EXCEPTIONNEL by Laurence Ferreira-Barbosa, André Eisermann in KASPAR HAUSER – VERBRECHEN AM SEELENLEBEN EINE MENSCHEN by Peter Sehr
- Special Jury Prize: Hartverscheurend by Mijke de Jong
- Special Mention, Official Jury: Beijing Zazhong by Zhang Yuan

=== Youth Jury ===
- First Prize UBS: L'Ecrivain Public by Jean-Francois Amiguet
- Second Prize UBS: Bhaji On The Beach by Gurinder Chadha

=== Oecumenical Jury ===
- Oecumenical Jury Prize: Bhaji On The Beach by Gurinder Chadha
- Special oecumenical Jury Mentions: Les Gents Normaux N’ONT RIEN D’EXCEPTIONNEL by Valeria Bruni Tedeschi, L’ECRIVAIN PUBLIC by Jean-Francois Amiguet

=== FIPRESCI Jury ===
- International Critics Award: Starting Place-Point De Depart by Robert Kramer, Azghyin USHTYKZYN’ AZABY by Ermek Shinarbayev

=== CICAE Jury ===
- CICAE Jury Prize: Kaspar Hauser - Verbrechen Am Seelenleben Eines Menschen by Peter Sehr
