= Maani Petgar =

- Born: November 1959 (age 66); Tehran, Iran
- Occupations: photographer; film director and producer; cinematographer and editor; film critic
- Parent: Ali Asghar Petgar
- Relatives: Jafar Petgar
- Family: Nami Petgar, Nima Petgar
- Website: www.maanipetgar.info

Maani Petgar (Persian: مانی پتگر) (born in 1959, Iran) is an Iranian-Australian filmmaker, stills photographer and film critic. He is known for documentary films that often occupy a space between fiction and documentary, employing experimental approach and, in some cases, essay-film forms. His work explores subjects such as filmmaking itself, Iranian cultural issues and the lives and work of artists. Early in his career, Petgar worked with Amir Naderi and Ebrahim Forouzesh. He immigrated to Australia in 1986 and worked in the film industry before making his own debut, Reverse Angle (1991). After directing and editing five other films, he returned to Iran in 1997 and continued his career.

== Stills photography and other work ==
Petgar began his career as a stills photographer on Amir Naderi's The Runner (1984) and as stills photographer, assistant director and assistant editor on Water, Wind, Dust (1985). He later collaborated with Ebrahim Forouzesh on The Key (1987) as stills photographer and assistant director.

He established his own production houses in Australia, Reverse Angle Productions (1996–2002) and in Iran, Unexposed Films (2004–present).

Petgar has also been a part-time film critic and has collaborated with Iranian Film magazine and other periodicals since 1987. His writings include film criticism, translations, and interviews with filmmakers such as Jane Campion, Donald Richie, Taviani brothers, and Akira Kurosawa (most likely Kurosawa's last interview).

== Filmography ==
- 1991 - Reverse Angle (28 min)
- 1992 - Point of View (10 min)
- 1994 - Station to Station (10 min)
- 1995 - Brothers (25 min)
- 1995 - Happy Ends (4 min)
- 1996 - Cinema Cinema (70 min)
- 1999 - The Needle and The Thread (30 min)
- 2000 - An Eclipse which Dropped from the Sky (21 min)
- 2002 - Film Lovers (50 min)
- 2007 - Looking Through (81 min)

== Reception ==
Petgar's films have been screened at festivals including IDFA, Dok Leipzig, Yamagata Documentary Film Festival, Torino Film Festival, Busan International Film Festival, Singapore International Film Festival, Margaret Mead Film Festival, Festival du nouveau cinéma, Dei Popoli Film Festival, Sheffield Documentary Festival, Tokyo International Film Festival, Chicago International Film Festival, Thessaloniki Documentary Festival, Roshd International Film Festival, and broadcast on SBS (Australia), Rai tv, and Planète+.
