= Revenge (1989 film) =

1989 film

- DVD cover
- Directed by: Ermek Shinarbaev
- Written by: Anatoli Kim
- Produced by: Habibur Rahman Khan
- Starring: Aleksandr Pan; Oleg Li; Valentina Te; Lubove Germanova
- Cinematography: Sergei Kosmanev
- Edited by: Polina Shtain
- Music by: Vladislav Shut
- Production company: Kazakhfilm
- Release date: 1989
- Running time: 99 min.
- Country: Soviet Union
- Language: Russian

Revenge (Russian: Месть, romanized: Mest, literally "Revenge", also known as The Reed Flute) is a 1989 Soviet historical drama film directed by Ermek Shinarbaev and written by Anatoli Kim. It was screened in the Un Certain Regard section at the 1991 Cannes Film Festival. The film was restored in 2010 by the World Cinema Foundation at Cineteca di Bologna / L’Immagine Ritrovata Laboratory and released as Revenge.

== Plot ==
The film is divided into 8 segments, each entailing part of the story.

=== Prologue ===
Set at the Korean royal court of the Kingdom of Joseon in the seventeenth century, the Emperor makes his rounds on the grounds of his palace. He witnesses his son and heir wrestling with another young boy. After losing, the prince runs to his father in tears. Somewhat irritated by his son’s loss, the Emperor asks his chief war advisor to present him the kingdom’s strongest warrior. Once introduced, the Emperor strips the warrior of his rank and title and tasks him with training the prince for 20 years in order to make a warrior out of him.

Years later, the prince has become Emperor and considers himself a great warrior. His friend, the boy he wrestled with as a child, has become a poet and part of the Emperor’s staff. As they make their rounds on the palace grounds, the Emperor and the Poet discuss the punishment of a soldier who had the misfortune of training with the Emperor and knocking him to the ground. Despite the soldier leaving the final blow incomplete, the Emperor has chosen to punish him. The Poet attempts to persuade the Emperor to grant the soldier clemency but the Emperor doesn’t yield. Noting that his beloved friend is unhappy with his choice, the Emperor tries to lighten the mood by having the Poet recite his works. Instead, the Poet begs the Emperor to allow him to leave the palace. The Emperor allows it but banishes the Poet from ever returning. The Poet walks away into the desert.

=== Tale 1: Yan ===
In a small Korean town in 1915, a group of young children are educated in a barn by a strict instructor, Yan. Losing his patience with the children, he takes his anger out on a young girl, scaring her into a corner of the barn and using a scythe to murder her. After realizing his error, Yan goes into hiding. News of the girl’s murder reaches her parents and the girl’s father, Tsai, vows revenge.

=== Tale 2: Tsai ===
Tsai asks a friend to tend to his land while he sets off on a ten-year journey to kill the murderous instructor, who has fled to China. Finally catching up to Yan at a barn, Tsai’s plan to use the same scythe used to murder him is thwarted when a healer interrupts, allowing Tsai to be defeated by a fellow tenant at the establishment. Yan escapes and Tsai returns home. His wife suggests he take for himself a concubine to have another child, in order to groom the child to take charge of avenging their murdered daughter.

=== Tale 3: The Mute One ===
Tsai takes a mute peasant girl as his second wife. She bears a child, named Tsai Sungu, whom she grows very fond of and raises him well. The boy’s poetry is acknowledged by his master who sees the boy’s potential for creating beautiful art.

One afternoon, Tsai, who has become sickly and lies on his deathbed, calls the boy to him. He makes Tsai Sungu promise to keep his life at a standstill until he has avenged his half-sister. Tsai then hands the blood-stained scythe to the boy before dying. Tsai Sungu sits outside the wall to his father’s home for days, worrying his mother who builds a small roof over him to keep him protected from the harsh sun. One day, a strange man driving a carriage passes by, asking to speak with Tsai’s family. The boy presents himself as Tsai’s son and the man reveals himself to be the instructor, Yan. He taunts Tsai’s first wife, who informs the boy that the man is the one he is to exact revenge on. As the carriage departs, the healer who aided Yan during Tsai’s quest is revealed to be seated in the carriage.

=== Tale 4: The Monk ===
The healer recalls a time when a wandering monk, Tsai Sungu’s master, arrived at her home. As he leaves, the woman faints and he watches over her until she awakens. He asks her to abandon her family and to accompany him to his master’s mountain in order to be healed. To be healed of her ailment, he warns, means she will have to marry and serve the most evil of men, in accordance to his master’s will.

As they leave Tsai’s land in the distance, Yan complains that he’ll get older and weaker as the boy grows older and stronger. The healer insists that the boy won’t seek revenge. The instructor then complains that the healer has yet to produce him any money or a child. The healer reveals that she’s been sent by the hidden rulers of the nation.

Ten years pass. During a rain storm, the wandering monk encounters his former pupil, now a young man, and asks him if he’s continued writing poetry. After Tsai Sungu reveals that he hasn’t, they begin a philosophical argument which leads Tsai to storm off into the pouring rain and announce that all that matters to him now is vengeance.

=== Tale 5: Elza the Romanian ===
Tsai and his mother have moved away from Korea in 1945. He works in a lumber mill along with a friend and a mute. At the mess hall, a food server named Elza calls him over. She asks him to bring her supplies from the mill to construct her house and he offers to help. After finishing up a job, she invites him inside and reveals that she wants to have children. She undresses and as he begins to undress as well, she’s horrified by the sight of blood on his pants. It is revealed that the boy now suffers from the ailment that his father died from.

=== Tale 6: Revenge ===
While on a train, the boy witnesses a child ask his mother to sing. As she begins the song, the voice of the boy apologizes to his mother and promises to carry out his mission. After getting up from his seat, two children take his spot and find the seat drenched in blood.

After disembarking the train, the boy sees visions of his father guiding him to the murderer’s home. There, he encounters the healer, now an old woman, who recognizes him. Weakened by his disease, Tsai falls to the ground and recounts memories from his childhood of his mother. Among the memories, he recounts his mother speaking, thanking old Tsai for her son.

The healer begins to nourish Tsai back to health. She reveals to Tsai that Yan died the previous year. A flashback reveals that Yan, now old and a drunkard, gets into an altercation with a group of young boys before falling asleep in a barn full of hay. The boys set a rat on fire which runs into the barn, igniting the hay and burning down the wooden structure.

=== Tale 7: The House ===
Tsai Sungu and the healer walk along the shore. Tsai kneels before her and asks to be her son. Without a word, the healer continues walking, leaving Tsai Sungu alone.

He continues construction on a home he is building for himself by the sea. An accident occurs, killing the healer. As Tsai looks over her body before the burial, he takes the scythe in his hand and takes his revenge for the beheading of his sister.

Suddenly, he awakens on the shore of the beach. On the other side, he spots a royal caravan carrying an emperor.

Two elderly Korean women pick up seashells from the shallow water and speak philosophically about children and the sea. The elder of the two suddenly drops her basket and reveals that she no longer wishes to live in the country. They proceed to watch birds fly in the direction of the sinking sun.

== Cast ==
- Aleksandr Pan as Tsai Sungu, the poet
- Valentina Te as the Healer
- Kasym Zhakibaye as Tsai (father)
- Lyubov Germanova as Elza
- Oleg Li as the old Emperor and the Monk

=== Others ===
- Juozas Budraitis
- Zinaida Em
- Maxim Munzuk
- Erik Zholzhaksynov
- Nikolai Tacheyev
- Li Kham Dek
- Olga Yenzak
- Tsoi Ke Suk
- Yana Kan
- Oleg Fomin
- Galina Pak
- Gennadi Lyui
- Baiten Omarov

== Comments ==
Upon the completion of the restoration for the World Cinema Project, Kent Jones wrote, in May 2010: "In a rage, a teacher murders a young girl. A boy is bred, for one sole purpose: to avenge his sister’s death. Kazakh master Ermek Shinarbaev’s close collaboration with the Korean-Russian writer Anatoli Kim yielded three great films, the most remarkable of which is this beautiful, profoundly unsettling film. A true odyssey, geographically and psychologically. One of the greatest films to emerge from the Kazakh New Wave, and one of the toughest." Jones later wrote an essay for the home video release by the Criterion Collection in 2017.

The director Ermek Shinarbaev also commented: "In the beginning of the 40s, hundreds of thousands of Koreans that had lived in the Russian Far East since the XIX century were forcibly displaced overnight according to Stalin’s orders. They were regarded as traitors and public enemies. Women, children, old people, were sent away with no explanation. The Korean diaspora, with a population of over a million, has been a forbidden topic for many years. Revenge is the first film telling the story of their tragedy." (Ermek Shinarbaev, May 2010)
