= The Way of Peace (film) =

- Directed by: Frank Tashlin
- Written by: Frank Tashlin
- Produced by: Wah Ming Chang; Blanding Sloan
- Starring: Lew Ayres (narrator)
- Cinematography: Wah Ming Chang
- Edited by: Stuart O'Brien
- Music by: Eddison von Ottenfeld
- Production companies: Christian Films; East West Studio
- Distributed by: Wartburg Press
- Release date: 23 April 1947
- Running time: 18 minutes
- Country: United States
- Language: English

The Way of Peace is a 1947 puppet animation film, financed by the Lutheran Church in America, giving a Christian view of life in the Atomic Age. It was written and directed by Frank Tashlin, produced by Wah Ming Chang, and narration read by Lew Ayres. In 2014, the film was selected for preservation in the National Film Registry, being deemed "culturally, historically, or aesthetically significant".

== Premise ==
The film is a Christian parable about the end of the world in the Atomic Age told with puppet animation. Its scope is broad, from the creation of the world to the birth of Christ to the atomic destruction of the Earth.

== Production background ==
- Producer Wah Ming Chang was a well-known designer, and Lew Ayres was a famous actor who was a conscientious objector during World War II.
- The Reverend H. K. Rasbach, a frequent adviser on big-budget films such as The Ten Commandments (1956) and The Greatest Story Ever Told (1965), provided technical supervision and story concept.
- The film premiered at Constitution Hall in Washington, D.C., with more than 2,700 in attendance, including members of Congress, representatives of the Supreme Court, and 750 leaders from various branches of government.

== Television ==
This short premiered on WCBS-TV in New York on Easter Sunday, April 6, 1947, at 7:15 p.m.

== See also ==
- Atomic Age
- List of American films of 1947
- Anti-war film
