= You're an Education =

1938 film by Frank Tashlin

- Blue Ribbon reissue title card
- Directed by: Frank Tashlin
- Story by: Dave Monahan
- Produced by: Leon Schlesinger
- Music by: Carl W. Stalling
- Animation by: Bob McKimson
- Color process: Technicolor
- Production company: Leon Schlesinger Productions
- Distributed by: Warner Bros. Pictures; The Vitaphone Corporation
- Release date: November 5, 1938
- Running time: 7 min
- Country: United States
- Language: English

You're an Education is a 1938 American animated comedy short film directed by Frank Tashlin. It was released on November 5, 1938. It is part of the Merrie Melodies series and the final to be directed by Tashlin before his replacement by Chuck Jones until his return in 1943. It was re-released as a censored "Blue Ribbon" reissue in 1946; an uncensored version of the original film exists but is not restored by Warner Bros. as of 2026.

== Plot ==
Literary characters magically come to life during a midnight adventure. It unfolds with travel agency brochures. As a globe spins, it reveals the agency's window decorated with posters of different countries. A song plays as the ads come to life. The song mentions various foods, leading to humorous references to places like Hungary, Turkey, and the Sandwich Islands.

Then the Thief of Baghdad uses the Florida Keys to break into a diamond mine, only to pawn them with the Pawnee Indians. He is pursued by soldiers and police from different nations but finds an unexpected ally in the Lone Stranger, enabling his escape.

== Reception ==
The film is described as "little more than strings of disconnected gags".

== Home media ==
- DVD – Looney Tunes Golden Collection: Volume 4, Disc 2
