= The Unruly Hare =

1945 film directed by Frank Tashlin

- Title card
- Directed by: Frank Tashlin
- Story by: Melvin Millar
- Starring: Mel Blanc; Arthur Q. Bryan (uncredited)
- Music by: Carl W. Stalling
- Animation by: Cal Dalton
- Color process: Technicolor
- Production company: Warner Bros. Cartoons
- Distributed by: Warner Bros. Pictures; The Vitaphone Corporation
- Release date: February 10, 1945
- Running time: 7 minutes
- Language: English

The Unruly Hare is a 1945 Warner Bros. cartoon in the Merrie Melodies series directed by Frank Tashlin and written by Melvin Millar. The cartoon was released on February 10, 1945 and stars Bugs Bunny and Elmer Fudd. The film was one of only two Bugs Bunny cartoons directed by Frank Tashlin at Warner Bros. Cartoons, the other being 1946's Hare Remover.

== Plot ==
The cartoon opens up on some railroad workers, in silhouette, who are singing "I've Been Working on the Railroad". Elmer is a surveyor for a railroad company, and the path of the new railroad goes directly over Bugs' current residence, as indicated by the signs. Elmer disturbs Bugs from reading "Hare Raising Stories" by singing "I've Been Wowking on the Waiwwoad". Bugs comments, "Hey! That sounds like Frankey Sinatra, or an unreasonable facsimile," then, after holding up a "P-U" sign, plays tricks on Elmer by making him see lovely ladies from an "Eksquire" magazine. Elmer kisses him, and in response, Bugs asks, "Is you is or is you ain't my baby?". Elmer realizes that he has been tricked, and Bugs runs to another hole in the ground and dives in. Elmer shoots down the hole. Elmer remarks, "I hate wittle, gway wabbits."

Bugs lights a match, making him see a forest fire through his surveying telescope, causing Elmer to panic. Bugs then, dressed up as a fireman, goes up a turntable ladder, slides down a fireman's pole, and deliberately squirts water from a seltzer bottle into his mouth, causing him to blow up into a bowling pin. Bugs laughs, telling the audience, "What a maroon! What a dope! Imagine! Asking for it!" Elmer suddenly appears behind him, all soaked and wet, and Bugs deliberately flicks his nose, then bends the barrels of his gun so that they each shoot the bullet behind him. Elmer shoots, and his bullets hit each of the two targets Bugs is holding. Bugs congratulates him for winning ("You win, Doc!"), then puts six cigars in his mouth, then runs away before they explode. Elmer chases Bugs, on the warpath against him, as the cigars and the blackface disintegrate.

Bugs jumps into his tree stump. Elmer shoots down the tree stump. Bugs, unscathed, pops up out of a hole, walks up to him, and asks him, "Eh, what's up, Doc?", to which Elmer replies, "I just put a cwazy wabbit out of his misewy." Bugs tells the audience, "It's murder, he says! How gruesome." As he peeks down the tree stump with Elmer, he whispers, "Don't look now, Doc, but you missed me." Elmer realizes his mistake, becomes enraged, literally turning red, and Bugs honks his nose, and runs back to the hole, and shouts "Geronimo!" before jumping down the hole. Bugs sticks a dummy head of himself up out of the hole to see if Elmer is still there. The dummy head gets bonked, literally shaking Bugs. Elmer celebrates, thinking he finally got him, and gets back to work. However, this time, Bugs appears on his surveying telescope. Elmer gets riled, saying, "Thewe's something scwewy awound hewe!", to which Bugs replies, "Eh, could be you, Doc."

Bugs kisses him, and Elmer sticks the gun into Bugs' mouth, then lifts him off his surveying telescope, and Bugs, doing a Joe Besser impression, taunts him, "Oh, you and your old gun, you craaazy!", which makes Elmer angry. Elmer has Bugs at gunpoint, the barrel of the shotgun poking his chest, pushing him. Bugs says, "Eh, only a rat would shoot a guy...in the back!". Elmer starts to pull on the trigger. After Bugs taunts, "I reiterate: only a big, fat rat would shoot a guy in the back." Elmer fires at point blank range, obscuring Bugs in a cloud of gunsmoke. Elmer turns and says, "So I'm a big fat wat!". Bugs suddenly appears through the cloud, unharmed, and effects a Jerry Colonna-like schtick ("Aaah! Have some cheese, rrrat!"), and stuffs a large wad of cheese into Elmer's mouth before scampering off back to his tree stump. When Elmer tries a stick of dynamite on Bugs, Bugs gets Elmer into a football game and a baseball game with the dynamite as the ball, until it literally follows Bugs, then sets off near a pile of railroad wood posts.

Bugs undermines his own efforts, since the explosion instantly lays the tracks and rails in their intended location. The creation of the railroad is followed immediately by the passing of an engine in full steam, Bugs riding in the back and waving goodbye to the cowering Elmer. The film ends with a reference to travel conditions in the United States home front during World War II. Bugs jumps off the train, and while "My Country, 'Tis of Thee" plays softly on the underscore, he closes the cartoon telling the audience, "Eh, I almost forgot. None of us civilians should be doing any unnecessary traveling these days." He decides to walk the tracks instead, to the tune of "Kingdom Coming" and seen in silhouette to iris-out.

== Censorship ==
- On The WB, the part where Elmer has his rifle pointed at Bugs and Bugs tricks him into shooting him with, "Only a rat should shoot a guy in the back" was cut.
- Some local stations (and televised prints from the early 1960s) edit out the part where Elmer is looking through his telescope and Bugs puts a pin-up magazine in front of the telescope.

== Home media ==
- (1986) VHS - Viddy-Oh! For Kids Cartoon Festivals: Bugs Bunny and Elmer Fudd Cartoon Festival Featuring "Wabbit Twouble"
- (1988) VHS - Cartoon Moviestars: Bugs Vs. Elmer
- (1990) VHS - Bugs Bunny Collection: Here Comes Bugs
- (1992) LaserDisc - The Golden Age of Looney Tunes, Vol. 1, Side 7: Bugs Bunny by Each Director
- (1992) VHS - The Golden Age of Looney Tunes: Vol. 7: Bugs Bunny by Each Director
- (2019) Boomerang Streaming Service - 1995 "NTSC" Dubbed Version print.
- (2020) HBO Max - Streaming (restored)
- (2023) Blu-Ray - Looney Tunes Collector's Choice: Volume 1 (restored)

== Notes ==
- This was the only Bugs Bunny short in which Frank Tashlin is credited, and one of two Bugs Bunny shorts directed by Frank Tashlin.
- Although Bugs did appear in one previous cartoon directed by Frank Tashlin, Porky Pig's Feat, he wasn't in a starring role in that short.
- This is the final Bugs Bunny cartoon to use the 1941-45 rendition of "Merrily We Roll Along".
- This is also the final Bugs Bunny cartoon not to have expanded credits, simply only crediting Supervision, Musical Direction, Story, and Voice Characterizations.
- While this short has appeared on at least one public domain DVD release, the copyright was renewed on October 25, 1972.

== See also ==
- Bugs Bunny filmography
- Elmer Fudd filmography
- Looney Tunes and Merrie Melodies filmography (1940–1949)

== Sources ==
- Shull, Michael S.; Wilt, David E. (2004), "Private Snafu Cartoons", Doing Their Bit: Wartime American Animated Short Films, 1939-1945, McFarland & Company, ISBN 978-0786481699

Preceded by Herr Meets Hare	Bugs Bunny Cartoons; 1945	Succeeded by Hare Trigger
