= Khomreh =

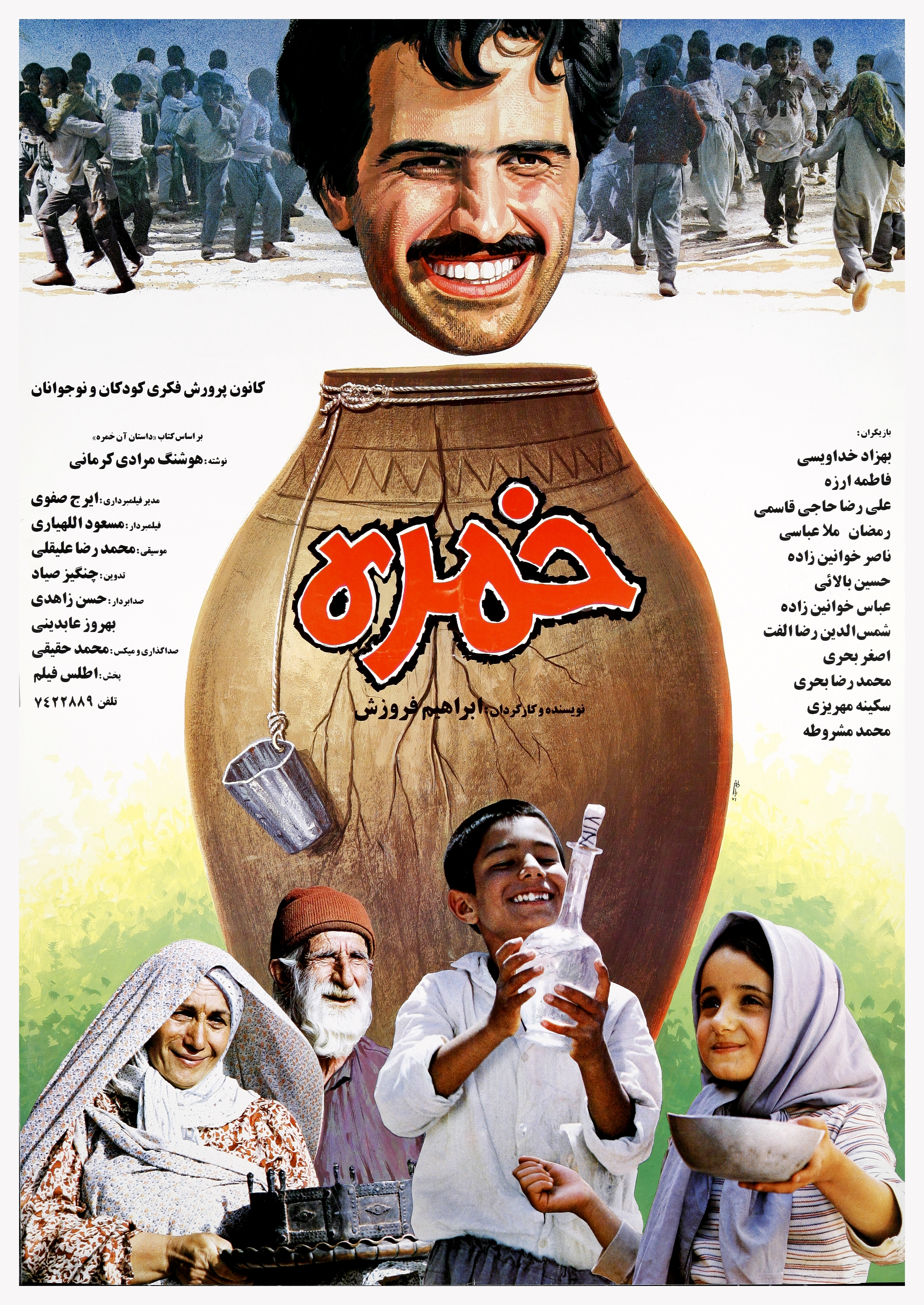
- Theatrical release poster
- Directed by: Ebrahim Forouzesh
- Release date: 1992
- Country: Iran

Khomreh (Persian: خمره; literally "jar") is an Iranian film directed by Ebrahim Forouzesh. The story is set in a hot schoolyard where kids quench their thirst using water from a large jar. One day it starts to leak. Fixing it proves to be a bigger problem than expected.

== Reception ==
It won the Golden Leopard at the 1994 Locarno International Film Festival.
