= Frank Tashlin =

American animator and film director (1913–1972)

- Born: Francis Fredrick von Taschlein; February 19, 1913; Weehawken, New Jersey, U.S.
- Died: May 5, 1972 (aged 59); Los Angeles, California, U.S.
- Other names: Frank Tash; Tish Tash
- Occupations: Animator, comics artist, children's writer, illustrator, screenwriter, film director
- Years active: 1929–1972
- Employer(s): Fleischer Studios (1929–1930); Van Beuren Studios (1930–1933); Leon Schlesinger Productions (1933–1934, 1936–1938, 1942–1944); Animated Pictures Corp. (1934–1935); Walt Disney Productions (1938–1941); Screen Gems (1941–1942); John Sutherland Productions (1946)
- Spouses: Dorothy Hill (m. 1936; div. 1949) Mary Costa (m. 1953; div. 1966)
- Children: 2

Frank Tashlin (born Francis Fredrick von Taschlein, February 19, 1913 – May 5, 1972), also known as Tish Tash and Frank Tash, was an American animator and filmmaker. He was best known for his work on the Looney Tunes and Merrie Melodies series of animated shorts for Warner Bros., as well as his work as a director of live-action comedy films.

== Animator and brief career as cartoonist ==
The Goldbrick, Private Snafu cartoon directed by Frank Tashlin in 1943

Born in Weehawken, New Jersey, Tashlin drifted from job to job after dropping out of high school in New Jersey at age 13. In 1930, he began working for John Foster as a cartoonist on the Aesop's Fables cartoon series, then worked briefly at Van Beuren Studios, but he was just as much a drifter in his animation career as he had been as a teenager. Tashlin joined Leon Schlesinger's cartoon studio at Warner Bros. Pictures as an animator in 1933, where he was known as a fast animator. He used his free time to start his own comic strip in 1934 called Van Boring, inspired by former boss Amedee J. Van Beuren, which ran for three years. He signed his comic strip "Tish Tash", and used the same name for his cartoon credits (at the time it was considered extremely unprofessional to use anything except one's birth name among animators, but Tashlin was able to get away with this due to the anti-German sentiment of that era). Tashlin was fired from the studio when he refused to give Schlesinger a cut of his comic strip revenues. He joined Animated Pictures in 1934, and moved to Hal Roach's studio the next year as a writer.

Tashlin returned to Schlesinger in 1936 as an animation director, where his diverse interest and knowledge of the industry brought a new understanding of camerawork to the Warners directors. "He used all different kinds of camera angles, montages, and pan shots, vertical and horizontal." He directed 16 or 17 shorts from 1936 to 1938. He was making $150 a week. In 1937, as part of a restructuring, Tashlin moved to Friz Freleng's old unit when Freleng left Schlesinger for MGM, meaning that Cal Howard and Cal Dalton took over Tashlin's old unit, Howard was succeeded in 1938 by Ben Hardaway, and both Hardaway and Dalton was succeeded in 1939 by the return of Friz Freleng.

At one point he had an argument with studio manager Henry Binder and resigned; he was replaced by Chuck Jones as director. In 1938, he worked for Walt Disney Productions in the story department, where he voluntarily worked for $50 a week, a lower salary, as Disney provided vastly superior working conditions. Tashlin was vice president of the Screen Cartoonist's Guild at the time, with Tedd Pierce as president; he also aimed to integrate Disney animators into the union. Tashlin and fellow Disney employee Roy Williams would periodically throw Donald Duck voice actor Clarence Nash out of a window while he rests for their amusement. Tashlin left Disney after a dispute with Disney over Mickey and the Beanstalk, but not before he instigated the Disney animators' strike in 1941. Tashlin's story was mostly used for the short after Disney's other storymen failed to produce a story treatment. Disney storyman Homer Brightman noted that Tashlin periodically used gags from silent films he watched in the past which were recorded in a notebook. Brightman also disputed Tashlin's involvement in the short's story due to its reworking years after Tashlin's departure. Afterward, he moved to Columbia Pictures' Screen Gems animation studio with other Disney staffers, serving as a director and producer at the studio. He launched The Fox and the Crow series and helped improve the studio's low quality output to a degree of prestige. He was fired over an argument with Columbia Pictures executives.

Tashlin rejoined Schlesinger in 1942 after Norman McCabe was drafted into the army. One of his directorial efforts was Porky Pig's Feat (1943), the final black-and-white appearance of Porky Pig. He stayed with the studio during World War II and worked on numerous wartime shorts, including the Private Snafu educational films. Shortly after he left Warner Bros. in late 1944, he directed some stop-motion puppet films for John Sutherland in 1946. Robert McKimson took over his unit after his departure from the studio. His only Bugs Bunny shorts were The Unruly Hare and Hare Remover. The latter was also his last credit at Warner Bros.

Martha Sigall described him as "Here today, gone tomorrow. Now you see him, now you don't. That was Frank Tashlin, who would be working at Leon Schlesinger's one day, and, suddenly, gone the next day."

== Film director and writer ==
Tashlin moved on from animation in 1946 to become a gag writer for the Marx Brothers, Lucille Ball, and others, and as a screenwriter for stars such as Bob Hope and Red Skelton. His live-action films still echo elements of his animation background; Tashlin peppered them with unlikely sight gags, breakneck pacing, and unexpected plot twists.

Tashlin began his career directing feature films when he was asked to finish directing the 1951 film The Lemon Drop Kid starring Bob Hope.

Beginning with the 1956 film The Girl Can't Help It, with its satirical look at early rock and roll, Tashlin had a streak of commercial successes with the Martin and Lewis film Hollywood or Bust in 1956, Will Success Spoil Rock Hunter? in 1957, which, like 1956's The Girl Can't Help It, starred actress and Playboy model Jayne Mansfield, and six of Jerry Lewis' early solo films (Rock-A-Bye Baby, The Geisha Boy, Cinderfella, It's Only Money, Who's Minding the Store?, and The Disorderly Orderly).

Moreover, in the 1950s Tashlin came to the approving attention of French film magazine Cahiers du Cinéma, in reviews that the director dismissed as "all this philosophical double-talk." In 2000, the broad, colorful satire of Madison Avenue advertising in Will Success Spoil Rock Hunter? earned the film a place on the National Film Registry. In 2014, his stop-motion animation short The Way of Peace was also added to the Registry.

In the 1960s, Tashlin's films lost some of their spark, and his career ended in the latter part of that decade, along with those of most of the stars with whom he had worked. His final film was The Private Navy of Sgt. O'Farrell starring Bob Hope and Phyllis Diller in 1968.

== Author ==
Tashlin wrote and illustrated three books, The Bear That Wasn't (1946), The Possum That Didn't (1950), and The World That Isn't (1951). These are often referred to as "children's books" although all contained satirical elements; The Bear That Wasn't was adapted as an animated cartoon by Tashlin's former Warner Bros. colleague, Chuck Jones, in 1967. Another children's story which Tashlin wrote in 1949 was recorded by Spike Jones: How the Circus Learned to Smile. Tashlin also wrote and self-published an instructional booklet entitled How to Create Cartoons (about cartoon drawing, not animation) in 1952.

== Death ==
Tashlin died on May 5, 1972 at the age of 59, at Cedars-Sinai Medical Center in Los Angeles after being stricken with a coronary thrombosis three days before at his Beverly Hills home. He is buried at Forest Lawn Memorial Park in Glendale, California.

== Filmography ==
=== Cartoon shorts ===
Year	Title	Series	Role
1932	Piano Tooners	Tom and Jerry	Animator (Uncredited)
1933	Magic Mummy	Tom and Jerry	Animator (Uncredited)
1933	Hook and Ladder Hokum	Tom and Jerry	Co-director with George Stallings
1933	Buddy's Beer Garden	Looney Tunes	Animator
1936	Porky's Poultry Plant	Looney Tunes	Director
1936	Little Beau Porky	Looney Tunes	Director
1936	Porky in the North Woods	Looney Tunes	Director
1937	Porky's Road Race	Looney Tunes	Director
1937	Porky's Romance	Looney Tunes	Director
1937	Porky's Building	Looney Tunes	Director
1937	Porky's Railroad	Looney Tunes	Director
1937	Speaking of the Weather	Merrie Melodies	Director
1937	The Case of the Stuttering Pig	Looney Tunes	Director
1937	Porky's Double Trouble	Looney Tunes	Director
1937	The Woods Are Full of Cuckoos	Merrie Melodies	Director
1938	Porky at the Crocadero	Looney Tunes	Director
1938	Now That Summer Is Gone	Merrie Melodies	Director
1938	Porky the Fireman	Looney Tunes	Director
1938	Have You Got Any Castles?	Merrie Melodies	Director
1938	Porky's Spring Planting	Looney Tunes	Director
1938	The Major Lied 'Til Dawn	Merrie Melodies	Director
1938	Wholly Smoke	Looney Tunes	Director
1938	Cracked Ice	Merrie Melodies	Director
1938	Little Pancho Vanilla	Merrie Melodies	Director
1938	You're an Education	Merrie Melodies	Director
1941	The Great Cheese Mystery	Fables	Writer
1941	The Fox and the Grapes	Color Rhapsody	Writer, Director
1941	The Tangled Angler	Fables	Writer, Director
1942	A Hollywood Detour	Color Rhapsody	Writer, Director
1942	Wacky Wigwams	Color Rhapsody	Writer, Producer
1942	Under the Shedding Chestnut Tree	Fables	Producer, Supervisor
1942	Dog Meets Dog	Phantasy	Producer, Supervisor
1942	Concerto in B Flat Minor	Color Rhapsody	Producer, Supervisor
1942	Wolf Chases Pigs	Fables	Producer, Supervisor
1942	Cinderella Goes to a Party	Color Rhapsody	Producer, Supervisor
1942	A Battle for a Bottle	Phantasy	Producer, Supervisor
1942	The Bulldog and the Baby	Fables	Producer, Supervisor
1942	Woodman, Spare That Tree	Color Rhapsody	Producer, Supervisor
1942	Song of Victory	Color Rhapsody	Supervisor
1942	The Gullible Canary	Phantasy	Supervisor
1942	Tito's Guitar	Color Rhapsody	Supervisor
1942	Toll Bridge Troubles	Color Rhapsody	Supervisor
1943	Porky Pig's Feat	Looney Tunes	Director
1943	Scrap Happy Daffy	Looney Tunes	Director
1943	The Goldbrick	Private Snafu	Director
1943	A Corny Concerto	Merrie Melodies	Writer
1943	The Home Front	Private Snafu	Director
1943	Puss n' Booty	Looney Tunes	Director
1944	I Got Plenty of Mutton	Looney Tunes	Director
1944	The Swooner Crooner	Looney Tunes	Director
1944	Brother Brat	Looney Tunes	Director
1944	Censored	Private Snafu	Director
1944	Plane Daffy	Looney Tunes	Director
1944	Booby Hatched	Looney Tunes	Director
1944	Target Snafu	Private Snafu	Director
1944	The Stupid Cupid	Looney Tunes	Director
1945	The Unruly Hare	Merrie Melodies	Director
1945	Behind the Meat-Ball	Looney Tunes	Director (Uncredited)
1945	Tale of Two Mice	Looney Tunes	Director (Uncredited)
1945	Nasty Quacks	Merrie Melodies	Director (Uncredited)
1946	Hare Remover	Merrie Melodies	Director (Uncredited)
1946	The Lady Said No	Daffy Ditties	Writer, Director
1946	Choo Choo Amigo	Daffy Ditties	Director
1946	Pepito's Serenade	Daffy Ditties	Director
1947	The Way of Peace	N/A	Writer, Director
1967	The Bear That Wasn't	N/A	Producer (credit only)

=== Feature films ===
Year	Title	Director	Writer	Producer	Notes
1940	Pinocchio	No	Uncredited	No	Script revisions
1945	Delightfully Dangerous	No	Story	No	Story co-written with Irving Phillips and Edward Verdier
1946	A Night in Casablanca	No	Uncredited	No	Script revisions
1946	Monsieur Beaucaire	No	Uncredited	No	Script revisions
1947	Variety Girl	No	Yes	No	Co-written with Monte Brice, Edmund Hartmann and Robert L. Welch
1948	The Fuller Brush Man	No	Yes	No	Co-written with Devery Freeman
1948	One Touch of Venus	No	Yes	No	Co-written with Harry Kurnitz
1948	The Paleface	No	Yes	No	Co-written with Edmund Hartmann
1949	Miss Grant Takes Richmond	No	Yes	No	Co-written with Devery Freeman and Nat Perrin
1949	Love Happy	No	Yes	No	Co-written with Mac Benoff
1949	A Woman of Distinction	No	Yes	No	Additional dialogue
1950	The Good Humor Man	No	Yes	No	
1950	Kill the Umpire	No	Yes	No	
1950	The Fuller Brush Girl	No	Yes	No	
1951	The Lemon Drop Kid	Uncredited	Yes	No	Co-written with Edmund Hartmann and Robert O'Brien
1951	My Favorite Spy	No	Uncredited	No	Script revisions
1952	The First Time	Yes	Yes	No	Co-written with Jean Rouverol, Hugo Butler and Dane Lussier
1952	Son of Paleface	Yes	Yes	No	Co-written with Joseph Quillan and Robert L. Welch
1953	Marry Me Again	Yes	Yes	No	
1954	Red Garters	No	Uncredited	No	Script revisions
1954	Susan Slept Here	Yes	Uncredited	No	Script revisions
1955	5 Against the House	No	Uncredited	No	Script revisions
1955	Artists and Models	Yes	Yes	No	Co-written with Hal Kanter and Herbert Baker
1956	The Lieutenant Wore Skirts	Yes	Yes	No	Co-written with Albert Beich
1956	The Scarlet Hour	No	Yes	No	Co-written with Alford Van Ronkel and John Meredyth Lucas
1956	The Best Things in Life Are Free	No	Uncredited	No	Script revisions
1956	The Girl Can't Help It	Yes	Yes	Yes	Co-written with Herbert Baker
1956	Hollywood or Bust	Yes	Uncredited	No	Script revisions
1957	Will Success Spoil Rock Hunter?	Yes	Yes	Yes	
1958	Rock-A-Bye Baby	Yes	Yes	No	
1958	The Geisha Boy	Yes	Yes	No	Co-written with Rudy Makoul
1959	Say One for Me	Yes	Uncredited	Yes	Script revisions
1960	Cinderfella	Yes	Yes	No	
1961	Snow White and the Three Stooges	No	Uncredited	No	Script revisions
1962	Bachelor Flat	Yes	Yes	No	Co-written with Budd Grossman
1962	Gigot	No	Uncredited	No	Script revisions
1962	It's Only Money	Yes	No	No	
1963	The Man from the Diner's Club	Yes	Yes	No	Co-written with William Peter Blatty
1963	Who's Minding the Store?	Yes	Yes	No	Co-written with Harry Tugend
1964	The Disorderly Orderly	Yes	Yes	No	
1965	The Alphabet Murders	Yes	No	No	
1966	The Glass Bottom Boat	Yes	No	No	
1967	Caprice	Yes	Yes	No	Co-written with John Kohn
1968	The Private Navy of Sgt. O'Farrell	Yes	Yes	No	
