= The Thief of Bagdad =

The Thief of Bagdad or Thief of Baghdad, a story based on One Thousand and One Nights, may refer to:

== Film and novelizations ==
- The Thief of Bagdad (1924 film), an American silent film starring Douglas Fairbanks
  - The Thief of Bagdad, a 1924 novel by film's screenwriter Achmed Abdullah
- The Thief of Bagdad (1940 film), a British historical fantasy
- The Thief of Bagdad (1952 film), a West German musical comedy
- The Thief of Baghdad (1961 film), starring Steve Reeves
  - Thief of Baghdad, a 1961 novelization by Richard Wormser
- Thief of Baghdad (1969 film), a Hindi film of 1969
- Thief of Baghdad (1977 film), a Hindi film of 1977
- The Thief of Baghdad (1978 film), a British–French co-production
- Baghdad Ka Chor, a 1946 Bollywood film
- Baghdad Thirudan, a 1960 Indian Tamil-language film

== Other uses ==
- Thief of Baghdad (TV series), an Indian fantasy adventure series 2000–2001
- Der Dieb von Bagdad, a board game nominated for a 2007 Spiel des Jahres award
- "The Thief of Baghdad", a song by The Teardrop Explodes from the 1980 album Kilimanjaro

== See also ==
- One Thousand and One Nights (disambiguation)
- The Adventures of Prince Achmed, a 1926 German animated fairytale film
- La Rosa di Bagdad ('The Rose of Baghdad'), a 1949 Italian animated film
- "The Thief of Baghead", an episode of the animated sitcom Futurama
