= Hare Remover =

1946 animated cartoon by Frank Tashlin

- The lobby card, labeling the cartoon as Elmer's Hare Remover.
- Directed by: Frank Tashlin; Robert McKimson (both uncredited)
- Story by: Warren Foster
- Starring: Mel Blanc; Arthur Q. Bryan (uncredited)
- Music by: Carl W. Stalling
- Animation by: Richard Bickenbach; Art Davis; Cal Dalton; I. Ellis; A.C. Gamer (effects)
- Backgrounds by: Richard H. Thomas
- Color process: Technicolor
- Production company: Warner Bros. Cartoons
- Distributed by: Warner Bros. Pictures; The Vitaphone Corporation
- Release date: March 23, 1946 (U.S.)
- Running time: 7:27
- Language: English

Hare Remover is a Merrie Melodies cartoon starring Bugs Bunny and Elmer Fudd, released in 1946. The film was the second Bugs Bunny cartoon to be directed by Frank Tashlin, the first being The Unruly Hare (1945).

It was also the last short Tashlin directed before leaving Warner Bros. Cartoons in late-1944 to direct live-action films. His animation unit was given to Robert McKimson upon his departure. Tashlin did not receive an on-screen credit.

== Plot ==
Bugs observes the potion's side effects on Elmer, animated by Cal Dalton.

Elmer Fudd plays the role of a mad scientist trying his best to make a "Jekyll and Hyde potion", but his experiments always end in failure, causing one of his test animals, a dog, to run out and eat grass. He decides to trap a rabbit (Bugs Bunny) as his next subject. After he traps Bugs, Elmer gives Bugs the potion, but to no avail. Elmer has a crying fit until Bugs gives him one of the potions, giving Elmer the same initial side effects as the other animals had experienced.

When a bear enters the lab from the nearby forest, both Bugs and Elmer mistake the bear for one another, until Elmer becomes angry at the bear (still thinking that it is Bugs) after refusing to take the potion that was going to cure him, which was the same potion Bugs gave to the bear earlier and which made him disgusted. Elmer scolds the bear until he discovers that the bear isn't Bugs Bunny when the real Bugs is at the window.

Elmer soon realizes his mistake, and the enraged bear chases him around the lab. As he begs for the bear to not kill him, Elmer, after heeding Bugs' option, plays dead to fool the bear, and is saved by his foul odor. Elmer thinks he's safe until he thinks he hears the bear again, when in fact it's just Bugs pretending to be one. Meanwhile, the bear is standing on the side of the room watching them, convinced that both Elmer and Bugs are crazy, flashing rebus picture cards to the audience showing a screw with a ball, a cracked pot, a dripping faucet, bats in the belfry, etc.

== Home media ==
This cartoon is found on Volume 3 of the Looney Tunes Golden Collection and Volume 2 of the Looney Tunes Collector's Vault.

== See also ==
- Looney Tunes and Merrie Melodies filmography (1940–1949)
- Bugs Bunny filmography
- Elmer Fudd filmography

Preceded by Baseball Bugs	Bugs Bunny Cartoons; 1946	Succeeded by Hair-Raising Hare
