= The Major Lied 'Til Dawn =

1938 film by Frank Tashlin

- Title card
- Directed by: Frank Tashlin
- Story by: Richard Hogan
- Produced by: Leon Schlesinger
- Starring: Mel Blanc; Tedd Pierce; Tommy Bond
- Music by: Carl W. Stalling
- Animation by: Philip Monroe
- Color process: Technicolor
- Production company: Leon Schlesinger Productions
- Distributed by: Warner Bros. Pictures; The Vitaphone Corporation
- Release date: August 13, 1938
- Running time: 7 minutes
- Country: United States
- Language: English

The Major Lied 'Til Dawn is a 1938 American animated comedy short film directed by Frank Tashlin. The short was released on August 13, 1938. It is part of the Merrie Melodies series. It has not aired on television and is rarely released on home media due to its depictions of stereotypical Africans.

== Plot ==
A big game hunter named Major Twombly tells stories of hunting in Africa to Freddie Bartholomew. In midwest Africa, Twombly travels on an elephant, a mobile home with his butler and several slaves holding his luggage. The slaves are depicted as feeble and unintelligent, such as eating a banana's skin and disposing of its flesh, using a lip plate as a record player and aimlessly walking into water to be eaten by a crocodile. Twombly approaches crossroads and uses a "road map for hitchhikers" which proves to be unhelpful, so he spins the signs around and crosses a random road. He spots two gazelles playing with pogo sticks and an elephant who tries fervently to remember something to no avail.

Twombly then walks into a village named Los Angeles, where natives find a lion in a bush. He uses his butler to track the lion, who is in a boxing ring. He easily beats the lion despite the lion cheating with metal weights. Tarzan is not happy with this and summons the other animals with a Tarzan yell, who manage to corner him. Twombly eats spinach Popeye-style and gains superhuman strength, managing to kill multiple animals in one hit and turn them into various products, including a crocodile suitcase, hippo piano and bear fur coat. A lion instead has his beard punched into his abdomen, which he perceives as a grass skirt and does a hula dance. Twombly then defeats all animals in the area as his story ends. Freddie asks about the elephant, who finally remembers to say "That's all, folks!", prompting a quick rendition of "Merrily We Roll Along" as the credits appear. The elephant was voiced by Mel Blanc, who coincidentally also voiced Porky Pig, who also said "That's All Folks" at the end of each Looney Tunes cartoon at the time.

== Voice cast ==
- Mel Blanc as the Elephant
- Tedd Pierce as Major Twombly
- Tommy Bond as Johnny
