= The Key (1987 film) =

- Directed by: Ebrahim Forouzesh
- Written by: Abbas Kiarostami
- Produced by: Ali Reza Zarrin
- Starring: Mahnaz Ansarian
- Cinematography: Mohammad Aladpoush
- Release date: 1987
- Running time: 76 min
- Country: Iran
- Language: Persian

The Key (Persian: کلید, romanized: Kelīd) is a 1987 Iranian drama film directed by Ebrahim Forouzesh and written by Abbas Kiarostami.

== See also ==
- List of Iranian films
