= Winter Vacation (film) =

- Directed by: Hongqi Li
- Release date: 2010
- Running time: 91 minutes
- Country: China

Winter Vacation (Chinese: 寒假; pinyin: Hán jià) is a Chinese film directed by Hongqi Li. It won the Golden Leopard at the 2010 Locarno International Film Festival.
