= Ebrahim Forouzesh =

Iranian film director

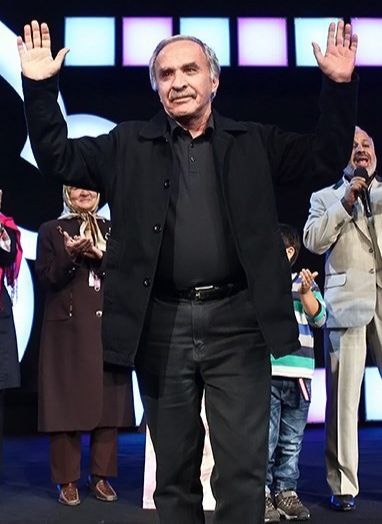
Ebrahim Forouzesh - 2013

Ebrahim Forouzesh (persian: ابراهیم فروزش, born 1939, in Tehran) is an Iranian film director, and a former manager of the cinema department at the Institute for the Intellectual Development of Children and Young Adults (1971-1978) where he oversaw the production of many films, shorts, features and animations. He has collaborated with Ali Akbar Sadeghi and Abbas Kiarostami. His second movie The Jar (خمره) won the Golden Leopard for the best Movie at Locarno Film Festival.

== Filmography ==
- Kelid (the key), 1987, written by Abbas Kiarostami
- The Jar (Khomreh), 1992
- The Little Man, 2000
- Children of Petroleum, 2001
- Hamoon and Darya, 2008
- Zamani baraye doust dashtan, 2008
- First Stone, 2010
- Shir too Shir, 2012

== See also ==
- Persian cinema
- Institute for the Intellectual Development of Children and Young Adults
