= Yermek Shinarbayev =

Soviet film director (born 1953)

- Born: 1953 (age 72–73); Alma-Ata, Soviet Union (now Almaty, Kazakhstan)
- Other name: Ermek Shinarbaev
- Occupation: Film director
- Years active: 1977-1994

Yermek Shinarbayev (also translated as Ermek Shinarbaev; Kazakh: Ermek Bektasūly Şynarbaev, Ермек Бектасұлы Шынарбаев) is a Soviet and Kazakh film director. Born in 1953 in Alma-Ata, Soviet Union (now Almaty, Kazakhstan), Shinarbaev is sometimes categorized as a member of the Kazakh New Wave. He is especially well known for his collaboration with the Korean-Russian writer, Anatoli Kim, resulting to three films. The last of Shinarbaev-Kim film Mest (Revenge), was screened in the Un Certain Regard section at the 1991 Cannes Film Festival and won the grand prize at Sochi Open Russian Film Festival in 1990.

== Filmography ==
- Sestra moya, Lyusya (My Sister Lucy) (1985) (script by Anatoli Kim)
- Vyyti iz lesa na polyanu (Out of the Forest, into the Glade) (1987) (script by Anatoli Kim)
- Mest (Revenge) (1989) (script by Anatoli Kim)
- Azghyin ushtykzyn'azaby (1993)
- Alciz Shurek (1994)
