= The Place on a Grey Tricorne =

- Azerbaijani: Azghyin ushtykzyn'azaby
- Directed by: Ermek Shinarbayev
- Written by: Nikita Dzhalkibayev
- Cinematography: Sergei Kosmanev
- Music by: Gulsara Mukatayeva
- Production company: Alem
- Distributed by: Kazakhfilm
- Release date: 1993
- Running time: 82 minutes
- Country: Kazakhstan
- Languages: Russian; Kazakh

The Place on a Grey Tricorne (Azerbaijani: Azghyin ushtykzyn'azaby) is a Kazakh film directed by Ermek Shinarbayev. It won the Golden Leopard at the 1993 Locarno International Film Festival.

== Plot ==
Some days of the young man living in Almaty. Boozes, girlfriends, an idle talk, drugs – here the maintenance of his life. And, seemingly, it for a long time, if not forever. "I didn't manage to appeal to the Marble Admiral as he turned on heels, precisely the horse who became on racks before the Pole star and specified to me that place on the cocked hat where I will have to carry out the life..."

== Reception ==
It won the Golden Leopard at the 1993 Locarno International Film Festival.
