= Anatoli Kim =

Kazakhstani author (born 1939)

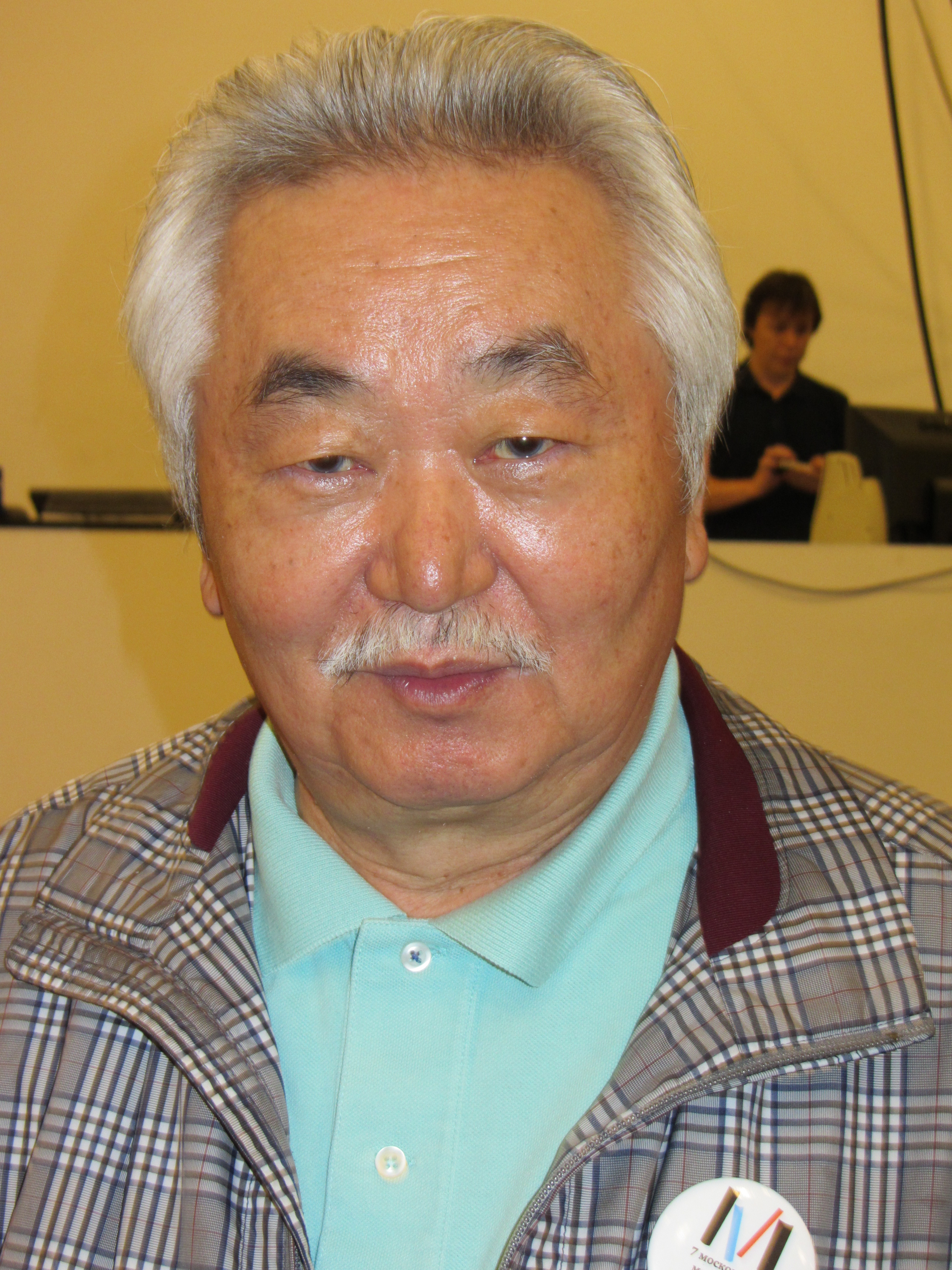
Anatoli Kim in 2013

Anatoli Andreyevich Kim (Russian: Анатолий Андреевич Ким; born 15 June 1939) is a Kazakhstani writer.

== Background ==
Kim's father was a Soviet Korean, the son of an immigrant to the Russian Far East in 1908; his mother was of Russian ethnicity. He claims to be a descendant of 15th-century Korean author Kim Si-sŭp. He was born in Sergievka, Tulkibas District, Chimkent Oblast, Kazakh Soviet Socialist Republic (today South Kazakhstan Province, Kazakhstan) and spent his early years there. In 1948, his family moved to the Russian Far East and Sakhalin, where he lived until 1957 before entering an art school in Moscow.

== Translations ==
Aside from his original works, Kim has also translated a number of Kazakh language works into Russian, including Abdijamil Nurpeisov's Last Duty (Последний долг) and Mukhtar Auezov's Path of Abay (a re-translation, to replace an older Soviet-era version perceived as insufficient).

== Selected works ==
- Отец-лес: роман-притча, Советский писатель, 1989, ISBN 978-5-265-00994-4, OCLC 21140793

== Sources ==
- Choi, Gunn-young (December 1988), "Russian and Oriental Elements in Anatoly Kim's Prose" (PDF), Rusistika, 5: 62–70, archived from the original (PDF) on 2011-08-07
- Bogdanova, O. B. (2005), "Ким, Анатолий Андреевич", in Skatov, Nikolai Nikolaevich (ed.), Русская литература 20. века, Olma Media Group, pp. 182–184, ISBN 978-5-94848-262-0
