= 45th Locarno Film Festival =

Film festival in Locarno, Switzerland

- Opening film: The Leopard directed by Luchino Visconti
- Location: Locarno, Switzerland
- Founded: 1946
- Awards: Golden Leopard: Autumn Moon directed by Clara Law
- Artistic director: Marco Mueller
- No. of films: In competition: 19 (14 World Premieres, 5 European Premieres)
- Festival date: Opening: 5 August 1992; Closing: 15 August 1992
- Website: LFF

Locarno Film Festival
- 46th 44th

The 45th Locarno Film Festival was held from 5 to 15 August 1992 in Locarno, Switzerland. All 19 films in competition were premieres, 14 were world premieres and the rest European premieres. Ten film in competition were first time features from directors.

This was Marco Mueller's first year as festival head and artistic director following the departure of David Strieff. Mueller wished to refocus the festival as a "market festival" in order to compete in the mid-level film festival circuit.

Under his leadership, the festival adjusted to attract more market buyers. Utilizing its $3.5 million budget, the festival paid for the hotels and food for around 50 distributors and buyers to entice them to attend. In addition, 30 buyers trips were paid for by the European Film Distribution Office (EFDO), which held its annual meeting in Locarno. In total, around 100 market buyers and distributors attended the festival.

The festival also upped its prize money to $50,000 for first prize, the Golden Leopard, $30,000 for the runner up Silver Leopard and $20,000 for the Bronze Leopard. Mueller also launched his pet project and entered into film production. Through the Montecinemaverità Foundation, he created a program to fund new films in exchange for the right to premiere the films at the Locarno festival upon completion.

The opening film of was the newly restored The Leopard directed by Luchino Visconti. Some world premieres included, Daniel Schmid's Off Season in the Piazza Grande and Wolfgang Becker's Child's Play in competition.

The Golden Leopard, the festival's top prize, was awarded to Autumn Moon directed by Clara Law.

== Jury ==
- Guglielmo Biraghi, Jury Chair, Italian critic and former head of the Venice Film Festival
- Geoff Gilmore, Sundance program director and UCLA film and television archive director
- Geraldine Chaplin, American actress
- Uli Steiger, Swiss Cinematographer

== Official Sections ==
The following films were screened in these sections:

=== Piazza Grande ===
The Piazza Grande is Locarno's open-air theater where out-of-competition films are screened.

Original Title	English Title	Director(s)	Year	Production Country
Antigone		Danièle Huillet, Jean-Marie Straub	1991	Germany, France
Baby Gang	Baby	Salvatore Piscitelli	1992	Italia
Charlotte Vie Ou Theâtre	Charlotte Life or Theater	Richard Dindo	1992	France
Hors Saison	Off Season	Daniel Schmid	1992	Switzerland, Germany
Hyènes	Hyenas	Djibril Diop Mambéty	1992	Senegal, Switzerland
Il Gattopardo	The Leopard	Luchino Visconti	1963	Italia, France
Il Ladro Di Bambini	The Thief of Children	Gianni Amelio	1992	Italia
Juice		Ernest Dickerson	1992	USA
Kinder Der Landstrasse	Children of the Country Road	Urs Egger	1992	Switzerland, Germany
Le Chêne	Oak	Lucian Pintille	1992	France, Romania
Leo The Last		John Norman	1970	Great Britain
Mac		John Turturro	1992	USA
No Dia Dos Meus Anos	On My Years	João Botelho	1992	Portugal
O Dia Do Desespero	The Day of Despair	Manoel de Oliveira	1992	Portugal
Strictly Ballroom		Baz Luhrmann	1992	Australia

=== Main Competition (Concorso Internazionale) ===
The Main Competition featured 14 world premieres and 5 European premieres.

Original Title	English Title	Director(s)	Year	Production Country
Confortorio	Conforter	Paolo Benvenuti	1992	Italia
Das Tripas Coraçao	Of the Guts Heart	Joaquim Pinto	1992	Portugal
Die Terroristen	The Terrorists	Philip Gröning	1992	Germany
Donusa	Donkey	Angeliki Antoniu	1992	Germany, Greece
Eddie King		Gidi Dar	1992	Israel
Holozän		Heinz Bütler, Manfred Eicher	1992	Switzerland, Germany
Kairat		Darezhan Omirbaev	1992	Kazakhstan
Kinderspiele	Child's Play	Wolfgang Becker	1992	Germany
La Vie Crevee	Life Shown	Guillaume Nicloux	1992	France
Mau-Mau	Would Want	Uwe Schrader	1992	Germany
Perumthachan		Ajayan	1990	India
Qiuyue	Autumn Moon	Clara Law	1992	Hong Kong, Japan
Quartier Mozart		Jean-Pierre Bekolo	1992	Cameroon, France
Rapado		Martín Rejtman	1992	Argentina, Netherlands
Rosa Negra	Black Pink	Margarida Gil	1992	Portugal
Sishi Puhuo	Family Portrait	Li Shaohong	1992	China
Video Blues		Árpád Sopsits	1992	Hungary
Villa Mauresque	Moorish Villa	Patrick Mimouni	1992	France
Zebrahead		Anthony Drazan	1992	USA

=== Leopards of Tomorrow ===
Leopards of Tomorrow (Pardi di Domani)

Leopards of Tomorrow / Brazil Program
Original Title	English Title	Director(s)	Year	Production Country
A Pricesa Radar	To Princess Radar	Roberto Moreira	1992	Brazil
Andre Louco	Andre Crazy	Rosa Berardo	1991	Brazil
Chà Verde E Arroz	Green Chà and Arroz	Toshiko Futemma, Olga Toshiko	1991	Brazil
Est Nao E' A Sua Vida	It's not 'Your Life	Jorge Furtado	1991	Brazil
Numa Bira De Estrada	In a Roadside	Marcos Gutmann, Luis Vidal	1991	Brazil
O Desertos Dias	O Desserts Dias	Fernando Severo	1991	Brazil
Rota Abc	ABC Route	Francisco Cesar Filho	1991	Brazil
Uma Noite Com Oswald	One Night with Oswald	Ricardo Dias, Inacio Zatz	1991	Brazil
Ex-USSR Special Program
D'Une Manière Miserable	Miserable	André Cirov	1992	Russia
L'Autre	The Other	C. Masloboïchikov	1989	Russia
Le Meilleur Des Mondes - Ou Plus Simplement Un Jour	The Best of all Worlds - Or more Simply One Day	Sergiu Prodan	1992	Moldova
Un Pas En Arrière	One Step Back	Gulnara Oldongarova	1992	Kazakhstan
Preview
Wath'S The Point		Eric Stitzel	1992	Switzerland
Program Number 1
Imouto To Abura-Age	I'm Getting Oiled with My Sister	Daisuke Tengan	1991	Japan
Murdered		Andrius Juzenas	1991	Lithuania
The Beauty Or The Beast		Mona Heol	1991	Norway
Versailles Rive Gauche	Versailles Rive Left	Bruno Podalydès	1991	France
Program Number 2
3000 Years Gravity		James Carman	1991	USA
Alcibiades		Sergio Trefaut	1992	Portugal
Das Kleine Objekt A	The Small Object a	Angelika Levi	1992	Germany
Jimbo'S Journey		David Kreutz	1992	USA
L'Homme Au Sable	The Sand Man	Massimo Donati	1991	Switzerland
Les Marionnettes	Puppets	Marc Chevrie	1991	France
Program Number 3
American Dream		Claudio Adani	1991	USA, Italia
Eine Live-Schaltung	A Live Circuit	Peter Kuhn, A. Rios	1992	Germany
G.A.S.		Manfred Birkl, Walter Steffen	1991	Germany
I Thia		Yannis Akonidis	1991	Greece
Nuits Noires	Black Nights	Gisèle Cavalli	1991	France
Release Me		Frances Lea	1991	Great Britain
Syn Chrone	Syn Chrons	Lilli Kirsten	1992	Germany
Program Number 4
Boxulmaleen	Phorny	Amet Diallo	1991	Senegal
Ecce Homo	Here is a Man	René A. Hazekamp	1992	Netherlands
Homage By Assassination		Elia Suleiman	1992	USA
Im Schatten Des Padyschah	In the Shadow of the Padishah	Thomas Bartels	1991	Germany
L'Altalena	The Swing	Vincenzo Terracciano	1991	Italia
Revolver		Chester Dent	1991	Great Britain
What Happened To Pete		Steve Buscemi	1992	USA
Program Number 5
Ah, La Primavera	Ah, Spring	Manuel Rodriguez	1991	Cuba
Caught, Looking		Costantine Giannaris	1991	Great Britain
Femmes Du Metro	Metro Women	Mendy Younès	1992	USA
Jenseits Der Gleise	Beyond the Tracks	Horst Markgraf	1992	Germany
La Course À L'Abîme	The Abyss Race	Georges Schwizgebel	1992	Switzerland
Lavomatic		Marie-Luce Felber	1992	Switzerland
Le Ali Di Cenere E Cromo	The Wings of Ash and Chromium	Marco Arnò	1992	France, Italia
Macanudo		Michael Küspert	1991	Germany
Sacramento		Ziziounkov	1992	Russia
Un Lugar Limpio Y Bien Iluminado	A Clean and Well -Lit Place	Mariano Bartolomeu	1991	Angola
Program Number 6
A Horse With Stripes		Andrew O'Sullivan	1991	Australia
Copiii Marcelarului	The Children of the Marcelar	Viorica Mesina	1992	Moldova
Kastajaiset	Baptismal	Jukka-Pekka Siili	1992	Finland
Maman Kaboul (Mama Esli By Ja Vernulsja	T	Bakir Kabulov	1991	Russia, Russia
Oscuros Rinocerontes Enjaulados	Dark Caged Rhinos	Juan Carlos Cremata Malberti	1991	Cuba
Quem Faz Correr Quim?	Who Makes Running Kin?	Mariano Bartolomeu	1991	Angola
Program Number 7
Etc		Stefan Gelineo	1992	Serbia
L'Ourse Bleue	The Blue Bear	Marc Chevrie	1990	France
Non Schiacciate Quel Bottone	Don't Crush that Button	Osvaldo Verri	1991	Italia
Om I Ona	About in ONA	Bakir Kabulov	1992	Russia
Paula		Sergiu Prodan	1992	Moldova
Solos Y Soledades	Alone and Solitudes	Javier Berrios	1991	Cuba
The Dead Boy'S Club		Mark Christopher	1992	USA
Program Number 8
Ankur		Peeter Simm	1991	Estonia
Cascaras		Mariana Rondón	1991	Venezuela
Cat'S Cradle		Liz Hughes	1991	Australia
Die Schwarze Sonne	The Black Sun	Johannes Hammel	1992	Austria, Switzerland
Ora Et Labora	ORA and LABORA	Benoît Vlietnick	1991	Belgium
Schwitchblade	Switchblade	Daniel Schäublin	1992	Switzerland
Shilde		Darezhan Omirbaev	1991	Kazakhstan
Special School Program In Switzerland
Antoinette P.		Sophie Meyer	1992	Switzerland
Apparences	Appearances	Karine Sudan	1992	Switzerland
Countdawn			1992	Switzerland
Image Et Realites	Image and Realities	Daniel von Aarburg	1992	Switzerland
La Cure	Care	Vincent Scalici	1992	Switzerland
La Plage	Beach	Bene Garcia	1992	Switzerland
Le Sang De Mon Frère	My Brother's Blood	Giovanni Piscalicchio	1991	Switzerland
Nardo	Nard	Giovanni Piscalicchio	1990	Switzerland
O Sangue E O Leite	Blood and Milk	Giovanni Piscalicchio	1991	Switzerland
Quatre Bulles De Lumière	Four Light Bubbles	Christian Davi, Ina Volmer	1992	Switzerland
Sensunik - Le Vième Sens	SENSUNIK - The 6th Meaning	Benoît Rossel	1992	Switzerland
Trois Dernières Images	Last Three Images	Chistina Davi, Séverine Schellenberg	1992	Switzerland

=== Retrospective – Mario Camerini ===
Retrospective Mario Camerini
Original Title	English Title	Director(s)	Year	Production Country
12 Trailers De Mario Camerini		Mario Camerini	1926	Italia
Battement De Crur	Crur Beat	Henri Decoin	1939	France
Batticuore	Heartbeat	Mario Camerini	1939	Italia
Cento Di Questi Giorni	One Hundred of These Days	Augusto Camerini	1933	Italia
Centomila Dollari	One Hundred Thousand Dollars	Mario Camerini	1940	Italia
Cirano Di Bergerac	Cirano in Berrerac	Augusto Genina	1922	Italia
Come Le Foglie	Like Leaves	Mario Camerini	1934	Italia
Crimen	...And Suddenly It's Murder!	Mario Camerini	1960	Italia
Darò Un Milione	I will Give a Million	Mario Camerini	1935	Italia
Delitto Quasi Perfetto	Almost Perfect Crime	Mario Camerini	1966	Italia
Don Camillo E I Giovani D'Oggi	Don Camillo and Today's Young People	Mario Camerini	1972	Italia
Due Lettere Anonime	Two Anonymous Letters	Mario Camerini	1945	Italia
Due Mogli Sono Troppe	Two Wives are Too many	Mario Camerini	1951	Italia
Figaro E La Sua Gran Giornata	Figaro and His Great Day	Mario Camerini	1931	Italia
Giallo		Mario Camerini	1933	Italia
Gli Eroi Della Domenica	The Heroes of Sunday	Mario Camerini	1953	Italia
Gli Uomini, Che Mascalzoni	Men, Who Mascalzoni	Mario Camerini	1932	Italia
Heartbeat		Sam Wood	1946	USA
I Briganti Italiani	Italian Brigands	Mario Camerini	1961	Italia
I Grandi Magazzini	The Department Stores	Mario Camerini	1939	Italia
I Promessi Sposi		Mario Camerini	1941	Italia
I'Ll Give A Million		Walter Lang	1938	USA
Il Brigante Musolino	The Brigand Musolino	Mario Camerini	1950	Italia
Il Cappello A Tre Punte	The Three-Pointed Hat	Mario Camerini	1934	Italia
Il Grande Appello	The Great Appeal	Mario Camerini	1936	Italia
Il Signor Max		Mario Camerini	1937	Italia
Io Non Vedo Tu Non Parli Lui Non Sente	I Don't See you Don't Speak He Doesn't Hear	Mario Camerini	1971	Italia
Je Vous Aimerai Toujours	I will Always Love You	Mario Camerini		Italia
Kali-Yug Il Mistero Del Tempio Indiano	The Mystery of the Indian Temple	Mario Camerini	1963	Italia
Kali-Yug La Dea Della Vendetta	Kali Yug: Goddess of Vengeance	Mario Camerini	1963	Italia
Kif Tebbi		Mario Camerini	1928	Italia
L'Ultima Avventura	The Latest Adventure	Mario Camerini	1932	Italia
La Bella Mugnaia	The Beautiful Mugnaia	Mario Camerini	1955	Italia
La Figlia Del Capitano	The Captain's Daughter	Mario Camerini		Italia
Le Mani Ignote	The Unknown Hands	Enrique Santos	1913	Italia
Ma Non È Una Cosa Seria	But It's not a Serious Thing	Mario Camerini	1936	Italia
Maciste Contro Lo Sceicco	Maciste Against Sheikh	Mario Camerini	1926	Italia
Moglie Per Una Notte	Wife for One Night	Mario Camerini	1952	Italia
Molti Sogni Per Le Strade	Many Dreams on the Streets	Mario Camerini	1947	Italia
Primo Amore	First Love	Mario Camerini	1959	Italia
Rotaie	Rails	Mario Camerini	1929	Italia
Suor Letizia	The Awakening	Mario Camerini	1956	Italia
T'Amerò Sempre	I will Always America	Mario Camerini	1933	Italia
T'Amerò Sempre	I will Always America	Mario Camerini	1943	Italia
Ulisse		Mario Camerini	1954	Italia
Una Romantica Avventura	A Romantic Adventure	Mario Camerini	1940	Italia
Una Storia D'Amore	A Love Story	Mario Camerini	1942	Italia
Vacanze A Ischia	Holidays in Ischia	Mario Camerini	1957	Italia
Via Margutta		Mario Camerini	1960	Italia
Voglio Tradire Mio Marito!	I Want to Betray My Husband!	Mario Camerini	1925	Italia

=== Film Surprise ===
Original Title	English Title	Director(s)	Year	Production Country
Peremena Oucasti	Change of Fate	Kira Muratova	1987	Russia
Xuese Qingchen	X UE Color Morning	Li Shaohong	1990	China

=== Out of Program (Hors Programme) ===
Original Title	English Title	Director(s)	Year	Production Country
Fool'S Fire		Julie Taymor		USA
Notte Di Stelle	Night of Stars	Luigi Faccini	1991	Italia
Piccola America	Little America	Gianfranco Pannone	1992	Italia
Schatten Der Liebe	Shadow of Love	Christof Vorster	1992	Switzerland
Surviving Desire		Hal Harltey		USA
The Singing Sculpture		Philip Haas		USA

=== Special Programs ===
Special Program
Original Title	English Title	Director(s)	Year	Production Country
Anthologie De Courts Metrages Necro-Realistes	Anthology of Short -Realist Courts	Evguenij Yufit'	1987	Russia
Boulevards Du Crepuscule	Boulevards Du Twilight	Edgardo Cozarisnky	1992	France
Chasse Gardee	Keeper Hunt	Jean-Claude Biette	1992	France
Desencuentros	Disagreements	Leandro Manfrini	1992	Switzerland
El Cielo Sube	The Sky Goes Up	Marc Recha	1991	Spain
El Sol Del Membrillo	THE SUN of the MEGRILLO	Víctor Erice	1992	Spain
India, Matri Bhumi	India, Mother Land	Roberto Rossellini	1958	Italia, France
Juste Avant L'Orage	Just Before the Storm	Bruno Herbulot	1992	France
Kamen		Aleksandr Sokurov	1992	Russia
Money Man		Philip Haas	1992	USA
Morire Gratis	Morire Free	Sandro Franchina	1967	Italia
Nottataccia	Night	Duccio Camerini	1992	Italia
Papa Umir Ded Moroz'	Papa Umer Ded Moroz '	Evguenij Yufit'	1991	Russia
Reservoir Dogs		Quentin Tarantino	1992	USA
Signé Renart	Signed Renart	Michel Soutter	1985	Switzerland
The Living End		Gregg Araki	1992	USA
Videogramme Einer Revolution	Video of a Revolution	Harun Farocki, Andrei Ujica	1992	Germany

=== 40 Years of Positif (Les 40 ans de Positif) ===
Original Title	English Title	Director(s)	Year	Production Country
Dossier 51		Michel Deville	1978	France
Nashville		Robert Altman	1975	USA
Nel Nome Del Padre	In the Name of the Father	Marco Bellocchio	1971	Italia
Reconstituirea	Reconstruction	Lucian Pintille	1969	Romania

=== Swiss Cinema Rediscovered ===
Swiss Cinema Rediscovered
Original Title	English Title	Director(s)	Year	Production Country
Matto Regiert	Matto Rules	Leopold Lindtberg	1946	Switzerland
Wachtmeiser Studer	Constable Studer	Leopold Lindtberg	1939	Switzerland

== Independent Sections ==
=== Critics Week ===
The Semaine de la Critique is an independent section, created in 1990 by the Swiss Association of Film Journalists in partnership with the Locarno Film Festival.

Original Title	English Title	Director(s)	Year	Production Country
Babel-Lettre À Mes Amis Restés En Belgique	Babel-Lettre to My Friends Who Stayed in Belgium	Boris Lehman	1990	Belgium
Face Of Our Fear		Stephen Dwoskin	1992	Great Britain
Last Supper		Robert Frank	1992	Switzerland
Le Pays Des Sourds	The Land of the Deaf	Nicolas Philibert	1992	France
Metamorfoz'I Ili Vzgliad Iz Tiur'Mi	Metamorphism or View from Prison	Mark Averbuch	1991	Russia
My Crasy Life		Jean-Pierre Gorin	1991	Great Britain, USA
Requiem		Walter Marti, Reni Mertens	1992	Switzerland
Sertschwan		Beatrice Michel-Leuthold, Hans Stürm	1992	Switzerland
Va Zendegi Edameh Darad		Abbas Kiarostami	1992	Iran
Warheads		Romuald Karmakar	1992	Germany, France

=== New Swiss Films ===
New Swiss Films / Feature Films
Original Title	English Title	Director(s)	Year	Production Country
Am Ende Der Nacht	At the End of the Night	Christoph Schaub	1992	Switzerland
Aus Heiterem Himmel	Out of the Blue	Dieter Fahrer, Felix Tissi	1992	Switzerland
Die Blaue Stunde	The Blue Hour	Marcel Gisler	1992	Switzerland
Ein Trommler In Der Wüste	A Drummer in the Desert	Rolf Lyssy	1991	Switzerland
Füürland 2		Clemens Klopfenstein, Remo Legnazzi	1992	Switzerland
Les Gants D'Or D'Akka	Akka's Golden Gloves	Nicolas Wadimoff	1992	Switzerland
Our Hollywood Education		Michael Beltrami	1992	Switzerland
Perfect Life		Véronique Goël	1991	Switzerland
Rien Que Des Mensonges	Nothing but Lies	Paul Muret	1992	Switzerland, France
Short Films
(It Was) Just A Job		Michael Beltrami		Switzerland
Demain Est Un Autre Jour	Tomorrow is Another Day	Danilo Catti		Switzerland
Paroles Passagères	Passing Lyrics	Denis Jutzeler		Switzerland
Pickelporno		Pipilotti Rist		Switzerland
Tchelovek S Krasnoj Ploshadi	Red Square	Sergueï Bodrov		Switzerland, Russia

== Official Awards ==
=== Official Jury ===
- Golden Leopard: Autumn Moon directed by Clara Law
- Silver Leopard: Kairat directed by Darezhhan Omirbaev
- Bronze Leopard: Die Terroristen directed by Philip Grönig
- Bronze Leopard (Fourth Prize): Eddie King directed by Gidi Dar
- Bronze Leopard (Special Prize): HOLOZÄN directed by Heinz Bütler and Manfred Eicher
- Special Jury Prize (Swissair/Crossair): Quartier Mozart directed by Jean-Pierre Bekolo

=== Youth Jury ===
- "Carte Jeunes" Prize: Quartier Mozart directed by Jean-Pierre Bekolo
- "The environment is the quality of life" Prize: Autumn Moon directed by Clara Law
- First Prize UBS: Donusa directed by Angeliki Antoniu
- Second Prize UBS: Video Blues directed by Árpád Sopsits
- Third Prize UBS: Confortorio directed by Paolo Benvenuti

=== Oecumenical Jury ===
- Prize: Sishi Buhuo directed by Li Shaohong
- Special mentions: Zebrahead directed by Anthony Drazan, Kinderspiele directed by Wolfgang Becker

=== FIPRESCI Jury ===
- International Critics Award: Requiem directed by Reni Mertens and Walter Marti, Kairat directed by Darezhhan Omirbaev

=== International Jury ===
- SSR Award: Copiii Marcelarului directed by Viorica Mesina, A Horse With Stripes directed by Andrew O’Sullivan
- Special mentions: Release Me directed by Frances Lea, Est Nao È A SUA VIDA directed by Jorge Furtado, Boxulmaleen directed by Arnet Diallo, The Dead BOY’S CLUB directed by Mark Christopher

=== CICAE Jury ===
- Prize: Autumn Moon directed by Clara Law
