= Taniec z gwiazdami season 10 =

Taniec z gwiazdami
- Season 10
- Hosted by: Piotr Gąsowski; Katarzyna Skrzynecka
- Judges: Iwona Pavlović; Piotr Galiński; Beata Tyszkiewicz; Zbigniew Wodecki
- Celebrity winner: Anna Mucha
- Professional winner: Rafał Maserak
- No. of episodes: 12

Release
- Original network: TVN
- Original release: 6 September – 29 November 2009

Season chronology
- ← Previous; Season 9 Next → Season 11

The 10th season of Taniec z Gwiazdami, the Polish edition of Dancing With the Stars, started on 6 September 2009 and ended on 29 November 2009. It was broadcast by TVN. Katarzyna Skrzynecka and Piotr Gąsowski continued as the hosts, and the judges were: Iwona Szymańska-Pavlović, Zbigniew Wodecki, Beata Tyszkiewicz and Piotr Galiński.

On 29 November, Anna Mucha and her partner Rafał Maserak were crowned the champions.

== Couples ==
Celebrity	Occupation	Professional partner	Status
Marek Kościkiewicz	Musician	Agnieszka Pomorska	Eliminated 1st on 13 September 2009
Iga Wyrwał	Model and actress	Łukasz Czarnecki	Eliminated 2nd on 20 September 2009
Weronika Rosati	Film and television actress	Krzysztof Hulboj	Eliminated 3rd on 27 September 2009
Piotr Zelt	Actor and television presenter	Anna Głogowska	Eliminated 4th on 4 October 2009
Grażyna Wolszczak	Film and television actress	Cezary Olszewski †	Eliminated 5th on 11 October 2009
Marcin Urbaś	Olympic sprinter	Katarzyna Krupa	Eliminated 6th on 18 October 2009
Zygmunt Chajzer	Television and radio presenter	Blanka Winiarska	Eliminated 7th on 25 October 2009
Otylia Jędrzejczak	Olympic swimmer	Sławomir Turski	Eliminated 8th on 8 November 2009
Radosław Majdan	Football Goalkeeper	Izabela Janachowska	Eliminated 9th on 15 November 2009
Michał Kwiatkowski	Singer	Janja Lesar	Third place on 22 November 2009
Natasza Urbańska	Actress and singer	Jan Kliment	Second place on 29 November 2009
Anna Mucha	Film and television actress	Rafał Maserak	Winners on 29 November 2009

== Scores ==
Couple	Place	1	2	1+2	3	4	5	6	7	8	9	10	11	12
Anna & Rafał	1	34	37†	71	40†	40†	35	39	26‡	40†	40+40=80†	40+40=80†	40+39=79‡	40+40+40=120
Natasza & Jan	2	38†	35	73†	40†	39	40†	39	40†	37	40+38=78	40+40=80†	40+40=80†	40+40+40=120
Michał & Janja	3	18	37†	55	31	36	32	34	36	39	36+36=72	38+38=76	40+40=80†	
Radosław & Izabela	4	26	26	52	31	30	29	28	29	29	30+38=68	32+38=70‡		
Otylia & Sławomir	5	24	28	52	35	23‡	36	34	27	28‡	26+35=61‡			
Zygmunt & Blanka	6	31	37†	68	30	33	39	40†	34	36				
Marcin & Katarzyna	7	23	27	50	32	26	31	27‡	27					
Grażyna & Cezary	8	27	30	57	36	37	30	33						
Piotr & Anna	9	22	33	55	27	29	24‡							
Weronika & Krzysztof	10	28	32	60	22	27								
Iga & Łukasz	11	17‡	19‡	36‡	15‡									
Marek & Agnieszka	12	31	23	54										

Red numbers indicate the lowest score for each week.
Green numbers indicate the highest score for each week.
indicates the couple eliminated that week.
indicates the returning couple that finished in the bottom two.
indicates the winning couple of the week.
indicates the runner-up of the week.
indicates the third place couple of the week.

Notes:

Week 1: Natasza Urbańska scored 38 out of 40 on her first dance (Cha Cha Cha). It was the highest score ever in Week 1. Iga Wyrwał got the lowest score in history of the show, scoring 17 out of 40 for her Cha Cha Cha. There was no elimination this week.

Week 2: There was a 3-way tie for the top of the leaderboard, with Anna Mucha, Zygmunt Chajzer and Michał Kwiatkowski scoring 37 out of 40. Michał Kwiatkowski made the biggest weekly improvement in history of the show, after scoring 18 points in Week 1 and then 37 points in Week 2. Steve Allen also made the biggest weekly improvement in history of the show, after scoring 18 points in Week 3 and then 37 points in Week 4 Season 8. Iga Wyrwał got 19 points for her Quickstep, making it the lowest score of the week. Marek & Agnieszka were eliminated despite being 4 points from the bottom.

Week 3: Anna Mucha and Natasza Urbańska received the first perfect score of the season as well as the earliest perfect score in history of the show. Only Mateusz Damięcki, Agata Kulesza, Alan Andersz and Dorota Gardias have scored 40 points in Week 3. Iga Wyrwał got the lowest score in history of the show, scoring 15 out of 40 for her Jive. Iga & Łukasz were on the bottom of the leaderboard for the third consecutive week. Iga & Łukasz were eliminated.

Week 4: Anna Mucha received her second perfect score for the Foxtrot. Otylia Jędrzejczak got 23 points for her Paso Doble, making it the lowest score of the week. Weronika & Krzysztof were eliminated despite being 4 points from the bottom.

Week 5: Natasza Urbańska received her second perfect score for the Samba. Piotr Zelt got 24 points for his Samba, making it the lowest score of the week. Piotr & Anna were eliminated.

Week 6: Zygmunt Chajzer got his first perfect score for the Salsa. There was a two-way tie on the second place, with Anna Mucha and Natasza Urbańska scoring 39 out of 40. Marcin Urbaś got 27 points for his Salsa, making it the lowest score of the week. Grażyna & Cezary were eliminated despite being 6 points from the bottom.

Week 7: All couples danced to the most famous songs of Michael Jackson. Natasza Urbańska received her 3rd perfect score for the Paso Doble. Anna Mucha got 26 points for her Jive, making it the lowest score of the week and her the lowest score ever. Marcin & Katarzyna were eliminated.

Week 8: All couples danced to songs from famous movies. Anna Mucha received her third perfect score for the Viennese Waltz. Otylia Jędrzejczak got 28 points for her Foxtrot, making it the lowest score of the week. Zygmunt & Blanka were eliminated despite being 8 points from the bottom.

Week 9: Anna Mucha got two perfect scores for her Cha-cha-cha and Waltz, having scored 3 perfect scores in a row. Otylia Jędrzejczak got 26 points for her Jive and 35 points for her Tango, making it the lowest score of the week. Otylia & Sławomir were eliminated.

Week 10: Natasza Urbańska got two perfect scores for her Cha-cha-cha and Argentine Tango. Anna Mucha also got two perfect scores for her Paso Doble and Foxtrot, having scored 5 perfect scores in a row. Radosław Majdan got 32 points for his Quickstep and 38 points for his Paso Doble, making it the lowest score of the week. Radosław & Izabela were eliminated.

Week 11: Michał Kwiatkowski got his first perfect score for the Salsa and second for the Foxtrot. Natasza Urbańska got two perfect scores for her Salsa and Viennese Waltz. Anna Mucha received her 8th perfect score for the Tango, having scored 6 perfect scores in a row. Anna Mucha also was in the bottom two for the first time in the competition. Michał & Janja were eliminated.

Week 12: Both Anna Mucha and Natasza Urbańska got 120 out of 120 points, making it the second season finale in a row with both couples getting the highest possible score. Both couples had to perform three dances: their favorite Latin dance, their favorite Ballroom dance and a Freestyle. Anna Mucha received her 9th, 10th and 11th perfect score for the Rumba, Quickstep in American Smooth and Freestyle. Natasza Urbańska also received her 9th, 10th and 11th perfect score for the Samba, Argentine Tango and Freestyle. Anna Mucha and Natasza Urbańska received 11 perfect scores. This is the record of the show. Anna Mucha won the competition, having cast 50.01 percent of the votes. This is the fourth time the winner was not on the first place according to the judges' scoreboard.

== Average chart ==
Rank by average	Place	Couple	Average	Total	Best Score	Worst Score
1.	2.	Natasza Urbańska & Jan Kliment	39.2	666	40	35
2.	1.	Anna Mucha & Rafał Maserak	38.2	650	40	26
3.	3.	Michał Kwiatkowski & Janja Lesar	35.1	491	40	18
4.	6.	Zygmunt Chajzer & Blanka Winiarska	35.0	280	40	30
5.	8.	Grażyna Wolszczak & Cezary Olszewski	32.2	193	37	27
6.	4.	Radosław Majdan & Izabela Janachowska	30.5	366	38	26
7.	5.	Otylia Jędrzejczak & Sławomir Turski	29.6	296	36	23
8.	7.	Marcin Urbaś & Katarzyna Krupa	27.6	193	32	23
9.	10.	Weronika Rosati & Krzysztof Hulboj	27.3	109	32	22
10.	9.	Piotr Zelt & Anna Głogowska	27.0	135	33	22
11.	12.	Marek Kościkiewicz & Agnieszka Pomorska	27.0	54	31	23
12.	11.	Iga Wyrwał & Łukasz Czarnecki	17.0	51	19	15
All couples			33.2	3484		

== Average dance chart ==
Couples	Averages	Best Dances	Worst Dances
Natasza & Jan	39.2	Jive, Samba (twice), Paso Doble, Rumba, Argentine Tango (twice), Cha-Cha-Cha, Salsa, Viennese Waltz, Freestyle (40)	Quickstep (35)
Anna & Rafał	38.2	Tango (twice), Foxtrot (twice), Viennese Waltz, Cha-Cha-Cha, Waltz, Paso Doble, Rumba, Quickstep in American Smooth, Freestyle (40)	Jive (26)
Michał & Janja	35.1	Salsa, Foxtrot (40)	Cha-Cha-Cha (18)
Zygmunt & Blanka	35.0	Salsa (40)	Tango (30)
Grażyna & Cezary	32.2	Paso Doble (37)	Waltz (27)
Radosław & Izabela	30.5	Rumba, Paso Doble (38)	Waltz, Rumba (26)
Otylia & Sławomir	29.6	Viennese Waltz (36)	Paso Doble (23)
Marcin & Katarzyna	27.6	Tango (32)	Waltz (23)
Weronika & Krzysztof	27.3	Quickstep (32)	Jive (22)
Piotr & Anna	27.0	Quickstep (33)	Cha-Cha-Cha (22)
Marek & Agnieszka	27.0	Cha-Cha-Cha (31)	Quickstep (23)
Iga & Łukasz	17.0	Quickstep (19)	Jive (15)

== Highest and lowest scoring performances ==
The best and worst performances in each dance according to the judges' marks are as follows:

Dance	Best dancer	Best score	Worst dancer	Worst score
Cha-Cha-Cha	Anna Mucha; Natasza Urbańska	40	Iga Wyrwał	17
Waltz	Anna Mucha	40	Marcin Urbaś	23
Quickstep	Michał Kwiatkowski	37	Iga Wyrwał	19
Rumba	Anna Mucha; Natasza Urbańska	40	Radosław Majdan	26
Jive	Natasza Urbańska	40	Iga Wyrwał	15
Tango	Anna Mucha	40	Zygmunt Chajzer	30
Foxtrot	Anna Mucha; Michał Kwiatkowski	40	Weronika Rosati	27
Paso Doble	Anna Mucha; Natasza Urbańska	40	Otylia Jędrzejczak	23
Samba	Natasza Urbańska	40	Piotr Zelt	24
Viennese Waltz	Anna Mucha; Natasza Urbańska	40	Radosław Majdan	29
Salsa	Natasza Urbańska; Michał Kwiatkowski; Zygmunt Chajzer	40	Marcin Urbaś	27
Quickstep in American Smooth	Anna Mucha	40	Otylia Jędrzejczak	34
Waltz in American Smooth	Natasza Urbańska	39	Michał Kwiatkowski	34
Argentine Tango	Natasza Urbańska	40		
Freestyle	Anna Mucha; Natasza Urbańska	40		

== Episodes ==
Individual judges scores in charts below (given in parentheses) are listed in this order from left to right: Iwona Szymańska-Pavlović, Zbigniew Wodecki, Beata Tyszkiewicz and Piotr Galiński.

=== Week 1 ===
Running order

Couple	Score	Style	Music
Otylia & Sławomir	24 (5,6,8,5)	Waltz	"Scarborough Fair" – Sarah Brightman
Piotr & Anna	22 (5,6,7,4)	Cha-Cha-Cha	"Stand by Me" – Ben E. King
Zygmunt & Blanka	31 (7,8,9,7)	Waltz	"Love Ain't Here Anymore" – Take That
Iga & Łukasz	17 (3,5,5,4)	Cha-Cha-Cha	"Let's Get Loud" – Jennifer Lopez
Grażyna & Cezary	27 (5,8,9,5)	Waltz	"When You Believe" – Whitney Houston & Mariah Carey
Michał & Janja	18 (3,6,6,3)	Cha-Cha-Cha	"Everywhere" – Fleetwood Mac
Radosław & Izabela	26 (5,8,8,5)	Waltz	"Just The Way You Are" – Billy Joel
Weronika & Krzysztof	28 (6,7,8,7)	Cha-Cha-Cha	"Give It 2 Me" – Madonna
Marcin & Katarzyna	23 (4,7,9,3)	Waltz	"What the World Needs Now Is Love" – Jackie DeShannon
Marek & Agnieszka	31 (7,8,9,7)	Cha-Cha-Cha	"Proud Mary" – Ike & Tina Turner
Anna & Rafał	34 (8,8,9,9)	Waltz	"Dancing Like Lovers" – Mary MacGregor
Natasza & Jan	38 (9,10,10,9)	Cha-Cha-Cha	"Street Life" – Roxy Music

=== Week 2 ===
Running order

Couple	Score	Style	Music
Grażyna & Cezary	30 (7,8,9,6)	Rumba	"A New Day Has Come" – Celine Dion
Marek & Agnieszka	23 (4,7,8,4)	Quickstep	Spider-Man Theme
Radosław & Izabela	26 (5,8,8,5)	Rumba	"N'Oubliez Jamais" – Joe Cocker
Iga & Łukasz	19 (3,6,7,3)	Quickstep	"Choo Choo Ch'Boogie" – Indigo Swing
Marcin & Katarzyna	27 (5,8,8,6)	Rumba	"On My Own" – Patti LaBelle & Michael McDonald
Natasza & Jan	35 (7,10,10,8)	Quickstep	"Get Out of Your Lazy Bed" – Matt Bianco
Zygmunt & Blanka	37 (9,9,10,9)	Rumba	"The Look of Love" – Dusty Springfield
Piotr & Anna	33 (8,8,9,8)	Quickstep	"Lemon Tree" – Fool's Garden
Anna & Rafał	37 (9,9,10,9)	Rumba	"Time After Time" – Cyndi Lauper
Michał & Janja	37 (8,10,10,9)	Quickstep	"Wonderwall" – Oasis
Otylia & Sławomir	28 (6,7,9,6)	Rumba	"Eternal Flame" – The Bangles
Weronika & Krzysztof	32 (7,9,9,7)	Quickstep	"No Me Voy Sin Bailar" – Ana Belén

=== Week 3 ===
Running order

Couple	Score	Style	Music
Marcin & Katarzyna	32 (7,8,9,8)	Tango	"Cell Block Tango" from Chicago
Weronika & Krzysztof	22 (3,7,8,4)	Jive	"Maniac" – Michael Sembello
Anna & Rafał	40 (10,10,10,10)	Tango	"El Tango de Roxanne" from Moulin Rouge!
Michał & Janja	31 (6,9,9,7)	Jive	"Take On Me" – a-ha
Zygmunt & Blanka	30 (6,8,9,7)	Tango	"Por una Cabeza" – Carlos Gardel
Iga & Łukasz	15 (2,7,5,1)	Jive	"Roll Over Beethoven" – Chuck Berry
Otylia & Sławomir	35 (8,9,10,8)	Tango	"In Dreams" – Roy Orbison
Natasza & Jan	40 (10,10,10,10)	Jive	"Let's Twist Again" – Chubby Checker
Radosław & Izabela	31 (7,8,8,8)	Tango	"Don't Stop the Dance" – Bryan Ferry
Piotr & Anna	27 (5,9,9,4)	Jive	"Hey, Little Rich Girl" – The Specials
Grażyna & Cezary	36 (9,9,9,9)	Tango	"I've Seen That Face Before (Libertango)" – Grace Jones

=== Week 4 ===
Running order

Couple	Score	Style	Music
Radosław & Izabela	30 (6,8,9,7)	Paso Doble	"El Conquistador" – Jose Esparza
Michał & Janja	36 (8,10,10,8)	Foxtrot	"Moon over Bourbon Street" – Sting
Otylia & Sławomir	23 (4,7,9,3)	Paso Doble	"Bring Me To Life" – Evanescence
Weronika & Krzysztof	27 (5,8,9,5)	Foxtrot	"Dream a Little Dream of Me" – Mama Cass
Grażyna & Cezary	37 (9,10,10,8)	Paso Doble	"Malaguena" – Ernesto Lecuona
Piotr & Anna	29 (6,9,9,5)	Foxtrot	"La Mer" – Charles Trenet
Marcin & Katarzyna	26 (5,7,8,6)	Paso Doble	"One Night in Bangkok" – Murray Head
Natasza & Jan	39 (9,10,10,10)	Foxtrot	"Fever" – Little Willie John
Zygmunt & Blanka	33 (7,9,9,8)	Paso Doble	"Ne cesito mas de ti" – Jennifer Lopez
Anna & Rafał	40 (10,10,10,10)	Foxtrot	"Hello" – Lionel Richie

=== Week 5 ===
Running order

Couple	Score	Style	Music
Zygmunt & Blanka	39 (9,10,10,10)	Viennese Waltz	"Unchained Melody" – The Righteous Brothers
Anna & Rafał	35 (8,9,10,8)	Samba	"La Mucura" – Beto Villa
Marcin & Katarzyna	31 (7,8,9,7)	Viennese Waltz	"Until" – Sting
Piotr & Anna	24 (4,8,8,4)	Samba	"Si Ya Se Acabo" – Jennifer Lopez
Otylia & Sławomir	36 (8,9,10,9)	Viennese Waltz	"Don't Give Up" – Peter Gabriel & Kate Bush
Natasza & Jan	40 (10,10,10,10)	Samba	"Bailando" – Alaska y los Pegamoides
Grażyna & Cezary	30 (6,8,9,7)	Viennese Waltz	"When a Man Loves a Woman" – Michael Bolton
Michał & Janja	32 (6,9,10,7)	Samba	"Santo Santo" – Só Pra Contrariar & Gloria Estefan
Radosław & Izabela	29 (5,8,9,7)	Viennese Waltz	"Trzej przyjaciele z boiska" – Andrzej Bogucki

=== Week 6 ===
Running order

Couple	Score	Style	Music
Michał & Janja	34 (7,9,10,8)	Waltz in American Smooth	"Since You Asked" – Judy Collins
Marcin & Katarzyna	27 (5,8,9,5)	Salsa	"Ahora Quien" – Estefano
Otylia & Sławomir	34 (8,9,10,7)	Quickstep in American Smooth	"Cheri Cheri Lady" – Modern Talking
Grażyna & Cezary	33 (8,9,9,7)	Salsa	"Puerto Rico" from Salsa
Natasza & Jan	39 (10,10,10,9)	Waltz in American Smooth	"Sunrise, Sunset" – Jerry Bock & Sheldon Harnick
Radosław & Izabela	28 (6,8,9,5)	Salsa	"La Vida Es Un Carnaval" – Celia Cruz
Anna & Rafał	39 (10,10,10,9)	Quickstep in American Smooth	"Back in Town" – Matt Dusk
Zygmunt & Blanka	40 (10,10,10,10)	Salsa	"Mi Bomba Sono" – Silvestre Méndez

=== Week 7: Michael Jackson Week ===
Running order

Couple	Score	Style	Music
Marcin & Katarzyna	27 (5,8,9,5)	Cha-Cha-Cha	"Black or White" – Michael Jackson
Michał & Janja	36 (8,9,10,9)	Rumba	"I Just Can't Stop Loving You" – Michael Jackson
Zygmunt & Blanka	34 (7,10,10,7)	Cha-Cha-Cha	"Billie Jean" – Michael Jackson
Anna & Rafał	26 (5,8,8,5)	Jive	"Rockin' Robin" – Michael Jackson
Otylia & Sławomir	27 (5,8,10,4)	Cha-Cha-Cha	"Rock with You" – Michael Jackson
Natasza & Jan	40 (10,10,10,10)	Paso Doble	"Smooth Criminal" – Michael Jackson
Radosław & Izabela	29 (6,9,10,4)	Cha-Cha-Cha	"Bad" – Michael Jackson
Marcin & Katarzyna; Michał & Janja; Zygmunt & Blanka; Anna & Rafał; Otylia & Sławomir; Natasza & Jan; Radosław & Izabela	N/A	Group Viennese Waltz	"Heal the World" – Michael Jackson

=== Week 8: Movie Themes Week ===
Running order

Couple	Score	Style	Music	Movie
Otylia & Sławomir	28 (6,8,9,5)	Foxtrot	"I Wanna Be Loved By You" – Marilyn Monroe	Some Like It Hot
Zygmunt & Blanka	36 (8,9,10,9)	Jive	"Greased Lightnin'"	Grease
Natasza & Jan	37 (9,10,10,8)	Waltz	"Moon River" – Audrey Hepburn	Breakfast at Tiffany's
Radosław & Izabela	29 (6,8,9,6)	Samba	"Stayin' Alive" – Bee Gees	Saturday Night Fever
Anna & Rafał	40 (10,10,10,10)	Viennese Waltz	"Noce i dnie" – Waldemar Kazanecki	Noce i dnie
Michał & Janja	39 (10,10,10,9)	Paso Doble	"On Her Majesty's Secret Service (Main Title)"	On Her Majesty's Secret Service
Otylia & Sławomir; Zygmunt & Blanka; Natasza & Jan; Radosław & Izabela; Anna & Rafał; Michał & Janja	N/A	Group Rumba	"Take My Breath Away" – Berlin	Top Gun

=== Week 9: Musical Duets Week ===
Running order

Couple	Score	Style	Music
Anna & Rafał	40 (10,10,10,10)	Cha-Cha-Cha	"Easy Lover" – Philip Bailey & Phil Collins
Anna & Rafał	40 (10,10,10,10)	Waltz	"Dobranoc" – Jerzy Wasowski & Jeremi Przybora
Radosław & Izabela	30 (6,9,10,5)	Foxtrot	"Cheek to Cheek" – Ella Fitzgerald & Louis Armstrong
Radosław & Izabela	38 (9,10,10,9)	Rumba	"Somethin' Stupid" – Frank Sinatra & Nancy Sinatra
Otylia & Sławomir	26 (4,10,10,2)	Jive	"Everybody Needs Somebody to Love" – John Belushi & Dan Aykroyd
Otylia & Sławomir	35 (8,9,10,8)	Tango	"Summer Wine" – Nancy Sinatra & Lee Hazlewood
Michał & Janja	36 (8,10,10,8)	Viennese Waltz	"Where the Wild Roses Grow" – Nick Cave & Kylie Minogue
Michał & Janja	36 (7,10,10,9)	Cha-Cha-Cha	"Say Say Say" – Michael Jackson & Paul McCartney
Natasza & Jan	40 (10,10,10,10)	Rumba	"Cose Della Vita" – Eros Ramazzotti & Tina Turner
Natasza & Jan	38 (9,10,10,9)	Foxtrot	"Come Fly with Me" – Frank Sinatra & Luis Miguel

=== Week 10 ===
Running order

Couple	Score	Style	Music
Natasza & Jan	40 (10,10,10,10)	Argentine Tango	"Tormenta Instrumental Tango" – Tomasz Szymuś
Natasza & Jan	40 (10,10,10,10)	Cha-Cha-Cha	"Czy czuje pani cza-czę" – Andrzej Rosiewicz
Radosław & Izabela	32 (6,9,9,8)	Quickstep	"Mój chłopiec piłkę kopie" – Jerzy Harald
Radosław & Izabela	38 (9,10,10,9)	Paso Doble	"Frozen" – Madonna
Anna & Rafał	40 (10,10,10,10)	Paso Doble	"Paso Royale" – Englebert
Anna & Rafał	40 (10,10,10,10)	Foxtrot	"As Time Goes By" – Dooley Wilson
Michał & Janja	38 (8,10,10,10)	Tango	"Last Tango in Paris" – Gato Barbieri
Michał & Janja	38 (9,10,10,9)	Jive	"I'll Be There for You" – The Rembrandts

=== Week 11 ===
Running order

Couple	Score	Style	Music
Michał & Janja	40 (10,10,10,10)	Salsa	"Merecumbe" – Pacho Galan
Michał & Janja	40 (10,10,10,10)	Foxtrot	"Eye of the Tiger" – Survivor
Anna & Rafał	40 (10,10,10,10)	Tango	"Hey Sexy Lady" – Shaggy
Anna & Rafał	39 (10,10,10,9)	Salsa	"Coge La Botella" – Alberto Carrillo
Natasza & Jan	40 (10,10,10,10)	Salsa	"Atrevida" – Justi Barreto
Natasza & Jan	40 (10,10,10,10)	Viennese Waltz	"Trędowata" – Wojciech Kilar

=== Week 12: Final ===
Running order

Couple	Score	Style	Music
Anna & Rafał	40 (10,10,10,10)	Rumba	"Time After Time" – Cyndi Lauper
Anna & Rafał	40 (10,10,10,10)	Quickstep in American Smooth	"Back in Town" – Matt Dusk
Anna & Rafał	40 (10,10,10,10)	Freestyle	"Niech żyje bal" – Maryla Rodowicz
Natasza & Jan	40 (10,10,10,10)	Samba	"Bailando" – Alaska y los Pegamoides
Natasza & Jan	40 (10,10,10,10)	Argentine Tango	"Tormenta Instrumental Tango" – Tomasz Szymuś
Natasza & Jan	40 (10,10,10,10)	Freestyle	"Who Wants To Live Forever" – Queen

Other Dances

Couple	Style	Music
Michał & Janja	Quickstep	"Wonderwall" – Oasis
Radosław & Izabela	Paso Doble	"Frozen" – Madonna
Otylia & Sławomir	Viennese Waltz	"Don't Give Up" – Peter Gabriel & Kate Bush
Zygmunt & Blanka	Jive	"Greased Lightnin'" – from Grease
Marcin & Katarzyna	Salsa	"Ahora Quien" – Estefano
Grażyna & Cezary	Tango	"I've Seen That Face Before (Libertango)" – Grace Jones
Piotr & Anna	Foxtrot	"La Mer" – Charles Trenet
Weronika & Krzysztof	Jive	"Maniac" – Michael Sembello
Iga & Łukasz	Cha-Cha-Cha	"Let's Get Loud" – Jennifer Lopez
Marek & Agnieszka	Quickstep	"Spider-Man" – theme song
Dorota & Andrej (9th Season Winners)	Freestyle	"The Battle" from Gladiator – Hans Zimmer
Marek & Agnieszka; Iga & Łukasz; Weronika & Krzysztof; Piotr & Anna; Grażyna & Cezary; Marcin & Katarzyna; Zygmunt & Blanka; Otylia & Sławomir; Radosław & Izabela; Michał & Janja	Group Freestyle	Celebration – Kool & The Gang

== Dance chart ==
The celebrities and professional partners danced one of these routines for each corresponding week.

- Week 1: Cha-Cha-Cha or Waltz
- Week 2: Rumba or Quickstep
- Week 3: Jive or Tango
- Week 4: Paso Doble or Foxtrot
- Week 5: Samba or Viennese Waltz
- Week 6: Salsa or an unlearned Ballroom dance in American Smooth style
- Week 7: One unlearned dance & Group Viennese Waltz (Michael Jackson Week)
- Week 8: One unlearned dance & Group Rumba (Movies Week)
- Week 9: One unlearned dance & one repeated dance (Duet Week)
- Week 10: One unlearned (or Argentine Tango) & one repeated dance
- Week 11: Salsa & one repeated Ballroom dance
  Natasza & Jan: One unlearned Latin dance & one unlearned Ballroom dance
- Week 12: Favorite Latin dance, favorite Ballroom dance & Freestyle

Couple	Week 1	Week 2	Week 3	Week 4	Week 5	Week 6	Week 7		Week 8		Week 9		Week 10		Week 11		Week 12		
Anna & Rafał	Waltz	Rumba	Tango	Foxtrot	Samba	Quickstep in American Smooth	Jive	Group Viennese Waltz	Viennese Waltz	Group Rumba	Cha-Cha-Cha	Waltz	Paso Doble	Foxtrot	Tango	Salsa	Rumba	Quickstep in American Smooth	Freestyle
Natasza & Jan	Cha-Cha-Cha	Quickstep	Jive	Foxtrot	Samba	Waltz in American Smooth	Paso Doble	Group Viennese Waltz	Waltz	Group Rumba	Rumba	Foxtrot	Argentine Tango	Cha-Cha-Cha	Salsa	Viennese Waltz	Samba	Argentine Tango	Freestyle
Michał & Janja	Cha-Cha-Cha	Quickstep	Jive	Foxtrot	Samba	Waltz in American Smooth	Rumba	Group Viennese Waltz	Paso Doble	Group Rumba	Viennese Waltz	Cha-Cha-Cha	Tango	Jive	Salsa	Foxtrot			Quickstep
Radosław & Izabela	Waltz	Rumba	Tango	Paso Doble	Viennese Waltz	Salsa	Cha-Cha-Cha	Group Viennese Waltz	Samba	Group Rumba	Foxtrot	Rumba	Quickstep	Paso Doble					Paso Doble
Otylia & Sławomir	Waltz	Rumba	Tango	Paso Doble	Viennese Waltz	Quickstep in American Smooth	Cha-Cha-Cha	Group Viennese Waltz	Foxtrot	Group Rumba	Jive	Tango							Viennese Waltz
Zygmunt & Blanka	Waltz	Rumba	Tango	Paso Doble	Viennese Waltz	Salsa	Cha-Cha-Cha	Group Viennese Waltz	Jive	Group Rumba									Jive
Marcin & Katarzyna	Waltz	Rumba	Tango	Paso Doble	Viennese Waltz	Salsa	Cha-Cha-Cha	Group Viennese Waltz											Salsa
Grażyna & Cezary	Waltz	Rumba	Tango	Paso Doble	Viennese Waltz	Salsa													Tango
Piotr & Anna	Cha-Cha-Cha	Quickstep	Jive	Foxtrot	Samba														Foxtrot
Weronika & Krzysztof	Cha-Cha-Cha	Quickstep	Jive	Foxtrot															Jive
Iga & Łukasz	Cha-Cha-Cha	Quickstep	Jive																Cha-Cha-Cha
Marek & Agnieszka	Cha-Cha-Cha	Quickstep																	Quickstep

Highest scoring dance
Lowest scoring dance
Performed, but not scored

== Weekly results ==
The order is based on the judges' scores combined with the viewers' votes.

Order	Week 1	Week 2	Week 3	Week 4	Week 5	Week 6	Week 7	Week 8	Week 9	Week 10	Week 11	Week 12 Final
1	Natasza & Jan	Anna & Rafał	Natasza & Jan	Anna & Rafał	Natasza & Jan	Anna & Rafał	Natasza & Jan	Anna & Rafał	Natasza & Jan	Anna & Rafał	Natasza & Jan	Anna & Rafał
2	Anna & Rafał	Natasza & Jan	Anna & Rafał	Natasza & Jan	Anna & Rafał	Natasza & Jan	Anna & Rafał	Natasza & Jan	Anna & Rafał	Natasza & Jan	Anna & Rafał	Natasza & Jan
3	Marek & Agnieszka	Michał & Janja	Otylia & Sławomir	Piotr & Anna	Otylia & Sławomir	Zygmunt & Blanka	Otylia & Sławomir	Michał & Janja	Michał & Janja	Michał & Janja	Michał & Janja	
4	Otylia & Sławomir	Zygmunt & Blanka	Grażyna & Cezary	Radosław & Izabela	Radosław & Izabela	Otylia & Sławomir	Radosław & Izabela	Otylia & Sławomir	Radosław & Izabela	Radosław & Izabela		
5	Radosław & Izabela	Otylia & Sławomir	Radosław & Izabela	Zygmunt & Blanka	Zygmunt & Blanka	Radosław & Izabela	Zygmunt & Blanka	Radosław & Izabela	Otylia & Sławomir			
6	Zygmunt & Blanka	Radosław & Izabela	Weronika & Krzysztof	Michał & Janja	Grażyna & Cezary	Michał & Janja	Michał & Janja	Zygmunt & Blanka				
7	Grażyna & Cezary	Weronika & Krzysztof	Piotr & Anna	Grażyna & Cezary	Michał & Janja	Marcin & Katarzyna	Marcin & Katarzyna					
8	Michał & Janja	Piotr & Anna	Michał & Janja	Otylia & Sławomir	Marcin & Katarzyna	Grażyna & Cezary						
9	Weronika & Krzysztof	Marcin & Katarzyna	Marcin & Katarzyna	Marcin & Katarzyna	Piotr & Anna							
10	Iga & Łukasz	Iga & Łukasz	Zygmunt & Blanka	Weronika & Krzysztof								
11	Marcin & Katarzyna	Grażyna & Cezary	Iga & Łukasz									
12	Piotr & Anna	Marek & Agnieszka										

This couple came in first place with the judges.
This couple came in first place with the judges and gained the highest number of viewers' votes.
This couple gained the highest number of viewers' votes.
This couple came in last place with the judges and gained the highest number of viewers' votes.
This couple came in last place with the judges.
This couple came in last place with the judges and was eliminated.
This couple was eliminated.
This couple won the competition.
This couple came in second in the competition.
This couple came in third in the competition.

== Audience voting results ==
The percentage of votes cast by a couple in a particular week is given in parentheses.

Order	Week 1	Week 2	Week 3	Week 4	Week 5	Week 6	Week 7	Week 8	Week 9	Week 10	Week 11	Week 12 Final
1	Natasza & Jan (30.75)	Natasza & Jan (28.46)	Natasza & Jan (26.09)	Anna & Rafał (30.66)	Natasza & Jan (23)	Anna & Rafał (28.16)	Anna & Rafał (33.01)	Anna & Rafał (29.59)	Natasza & Jan (27.69)	Anna & Rafał (33.69)	Anna & Rafał (36.42)	Anna & Rafał (50.01)
2	Anna & Rafał (17.01)	Anna & Rafał (20.72)	Anna & Rafał (22.66)	Natasza & Jan (21.97)	Anna & Rafał (21.04)	Natasza & Jan (22.93)	Natasza & Jan (25.86)	Natasza & Jan (22.19)	Anna & Rafał (25.73)	Natasza & Jan (29.1)	Natasza & Jan (35.25)	Natasza & Jan (49.99)
3	Otylia & Sławomir (12.64)	Otylia & Sławomir (10.41)	Otylia & Sławomir (9.1)	Otylia & Sławomir (14.43)	Radosław & Izabela (17.46)	Radosław & Izabela (13.92)	Otylia & Sławomir (13.59)	Michał & Janja (13.92)	Michał & Janja (17.7)	Michał & Janja (21.53)	Michał & Janja (28.33)	
4	Radosław & Izabela (7.47)	Radosław & Izabela (7.67)	Weronika & Krzysztof (7.38)	Piotr & Anna (6.28)	Otylia & Sławomir (9.6)	Zygmunt & Blanka (12.12)	Radosław & Izabela (12.43)	Otylia & Sławomir (13.83)	Radosław & Izabela (15.89)	Radosław & Izabela (15.68)		
5	Michał & Janja (7.31)	Michał & Janja (6.87)	Grażyna & Cezary (6.83)	Radosław & Izabela (5.9)	Grażyna & Cezary (6.33)	Otylia & Sławomir (9.58)	Zygmunt & Blanka (6.49)	Radosław & Izabela (12.28)	Otylia & Sławomir (12.99)			
6	Marek & Agnieszka (4.36)	Zygmunt & Blanka (4.85)	Piotr & Anna (6.48)	Zygmunt & Blanka (5.16)	Piotr & Anna (6.29)	Marcin & Katarzyna (4.93)	Michał & Janja (4.49)	Zygmunt & Blanka (8.19)				
7	Iga & Łukasz (4.14)	Iga & Łukasz (3.88)	Radosław & Izabela (6.3)	Michał & Janja (4.34)	Michał & Janja (6.14)	Michał & Janja (4.73)	Marcin & Katarzyna (4.13)					
8	Zygmunt & Blanka (3.7)	Weronika & Krzysztof (3.73)	Iga & Łukasz (4.64)	Marcin & Katarzyna (4.04)	Marcin & Katarzyna (5.2)	Grażyna & Cezary (3.63)						
9	Grażyna & Cezary (3.49)	Marcin & Katarzyna (3.61)	Zygmunt & Blanka (4.42)	Grażyna & Cezary (3.7)	Zygmunt & Blanka (4.94)							
10	Marcin & Katarzyna (3.45)	Marek & Agnieszka (3.55)	Michał & Janja (3.33)	Weronika & Krzysztof (3.52)								
11	Weronika & Krzysztof (3.43)	Piotr & Anna (3.41)	Marcin & Katarzyna (2.77)									
12	Piotr & Anna (2.25)	Grażyna & Cezary (2.84)										

== Guest performances ==
Episode	Date	Singer/Star	Song	Dancer
1	6 September 2009	Oscar Loya & Alex Christensen	"Miss Kiss Kiss Bang"	Group VOLT
1	6 September 2009	Oscar Loya & Alex Christensen	"Puttin on the Ritz"	Group VOLT
2	13 September 2009	Oceana	"Pussycat on a Leash"	Group VOLT
3	20 September 2009	Jazzkantine	"Highway to Hell"	–
4	27 September 2009	Tomasz Szymuś's Orchestra	"Candyman"	Natalia Lesz, Justyna Steczkowska, Ivan Komarenko, Witold Paszt, Marina Łuczenko, Łukasz Zagrobelny, Paweł Stasiak & Group VOLT
4	27 September 2009	Justyna Steczkowska	"Tango"	Łukasz Czarnecki, Krzysztof Hulboj, Rafał Maserak, Jan Kliment & Tomasz Barański
5	4 October 2009	Alexander Rybak	"Fairytale"	Group VOLT
6	11 October 2009	Tomasz Szymuś's Orchestra	"Celebration"	Group VOLT
6	11 October 2009	Tomasz Szymuś's Orchestra	"Tango Del'Amore"	Anna Guzik & Agata Kulesza (winner 6th and 8th season)
7	18 October 2009	Tomasz Szymuś's Orchestra	"Thriller"	Group VOLT
7	18 October 2009	Paulina Lenda	"Dirty Diana"	Group VOLT
8	25 October 2009	Michał Rudaś	"Jai Ho"	Group VOLT
9	8 November 2009	Katarzyna Skrzynecka & Piotr Gąsowski	"That's What Friends Are For"	Judges
9	8 November 2009	Tomasz Szymuś's Orchestra	"Tango"	Danuta Stenka & Stefano Terrazzino
10	15 November 2009	Tomasz Szymuś's Orchestra	"I Love Salsa!"	Group VOLT
10	15 November 2009	Ive Mendes	"What You Love to Do"	–
11	22 November 2009	The Baseballs	"Umbrella"	Group VOLT
11	22 November 2009	The Baseballs	"Angels"	–
12	29 November 2009	Doda	"Gram o wszystko"	–
12	29 November 2009	Michał Kwiatkowski	"Nothing Compares to You"	–

== Rating figures ==
Episode	Date	Official rating 4	Share 4+	Official rating 16–39	Share 16–39
1	6 September 2009	4,628,285	30.56%	1,832,663	25.99%
2	13 September 2009	3,785,949	23.04%	1,553,039	19.57%
3	20 September 2009	4,498,035	30.32%	1,795,138	25.73%
4	27 September 2009	4,842,243	30.84%	2,064,519	27.19%
5	4 October 2009	4,367,128	26.73%	1,861,013	24.04%
6	11 October 2009	4,952,120	29.76%	2,092,417	26.85%
7	18 October 2009	5,059,740	29.71%	2,156,847	27.15%
8	25 October 2009	4,779,107	28.57%	1,945,939	25.19%
9	8 November 2009	4,933,441	29.17%	1,963,837	24.90%
10	15 November 2009	5,220,602	30.11%	2,063,030	25.77%
11	22 November 2009	5,331,116	30.39%	2,242,366	27.72%
12	29 November 2009	6,248,429	36.27%	2,597,685	32.27%
Average	Season 10	4,864,325	29.62%	2,002,022	25.97%
