= Under Western Eyes =

Under Western Eyes may refer to:

- Under Western Eyes (novel), a 1912 novel by Joseph Conrad
- Under Western Eyes (1936 film), French film based on the novel
- Under Western Eyes (1996 film), Israeli film
