= Off Season (1992 film) =

- Promotional poster
- Directed by: Daniel Schmid
- Written by: Daniel Schmid; Martin Suter
- Produced by: Marcel Hoehn; Christoph Holch; Luciano Gloor; Martine Marignac
- Starring: Sami Frey; Maria Maddalena Fellini; Geraldine Chaplin; Marisa Paredes; Ingrid Caven
- Cinematography: Renato Berta
- Edited by: Daniela Roderer
- Music by: Peer Raben
- Release dates: August 1992 (Locarno); 10 February 1993 (France)
- Running time: 95 minutes
- Countries: France; Switzerland; Germany
- Language: French

Off Season (French: Hors Saison) is a 1992 comedy film by Daniel Schmid, who also co-wrote the screenplay with Martin Suter. The film is semi-autobiographical for Schmid, who re-imagines the hotel he grew up in the Swiss Alps. The French-Swiss-German co-production premiered at the Locarno International Film Festival in August 1992, followed by a screening at the Toronto International Film Festival on 12 September 1992. The film was the Swiss submission for the Academy Award for Best Foreign Language Film, but was not accepted as a nominee.

== Plot ==
Adult narrator, (Sami Frey) recalls his mysterious childhood at a mountainside hotel which he shared with his mother, grandmother and the hotel's guests. The hotel is host to a series of interesting guests, from the actress, Sarah Bernhardt (Paredes), an anarchist assassin (Chaplin), torch singers and seductive women.

== Cast ==
- Sami Frey as Narrator
- Maria Maddalena Fellini as Grandma
- Marisa Paredes as Sarah Bernhardt
- Geraldine Chaplin as Anarchist
- Ingrid Caven as Lilo
- Andréa Ferréol as Mlle Gabriel
- Arielle Dombasle as Mme. Studer
- Maurice Garrel as Grandpa
- Dieter Meier as Max
- Ulli Lommel as Prof. Malini
- Carlos Devesa as Valentin
- Irene Olgiati as Couple

== Reception ==
The film was well received by Variety, "Hors Saison is an unabashed cinematic circus populated by a Fellini-like cast of caricatures. It is irony and good humour make it high-class, entertainment for family audiences as well as the director's art house fans." David Robinson wrote in The Times that the film offers "rich nostalgia" and that it "delights in the colourful ghosts of the place [hotel]".

== See also ==
- List of submissions to the 65th Academy Awards for Best Foreign Language Film
- List of Swiss submissions for the Academy Award for Best Foreign Language Film
