= 47th Berlin International Film Festival =

1997 film festival in Berlin, Germany

- Festival poster
- Location: Berlin, Germany
- Founded: 1951
- Awards: Golden Bear: The People vs. Larry Flynt
- No. of films: 324 films
- Festival date: 13–24 February 1997
- Website: http://www.berlinale.de

Berlin International Film Festival chronology
- 48th 46th

The 47th annual Berlin International Film Festival was held from 13 to 24 February 1997.

The Golden Bear was awarded to Canadian-American film The People vs. Larry Flynt directed by Miloš Forman.

The retrospective dedicated to Austrian film director G. W. Pabst was shown at the festival.

== Juries ==
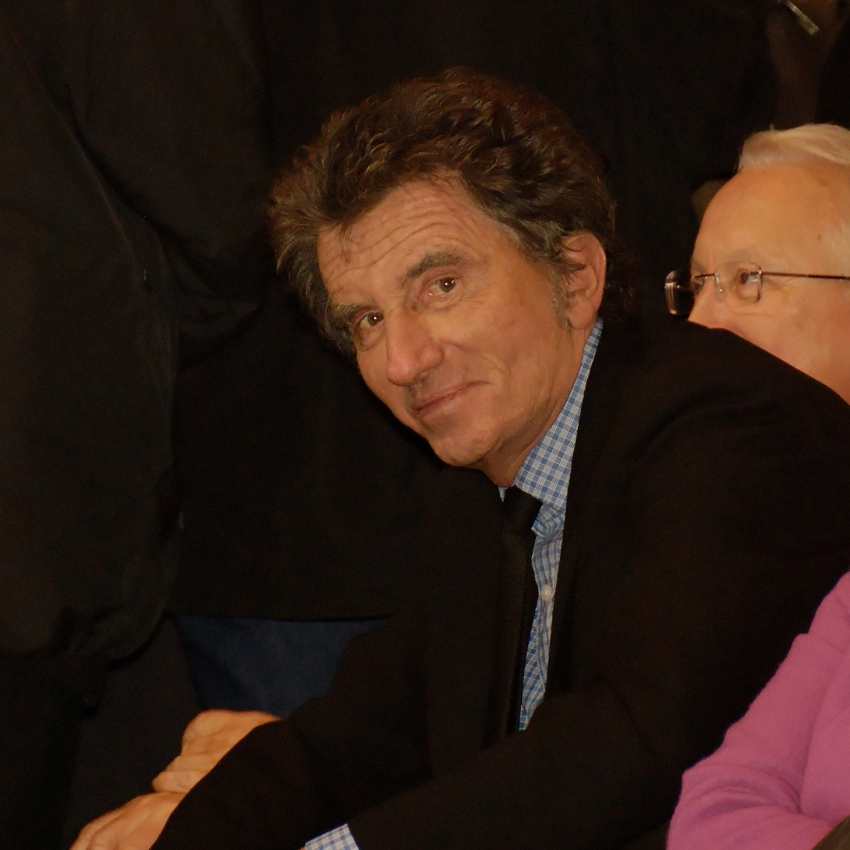
Jack Lang, Jury President

The following people were announced as being on the jury for the festival:

=== Main Competition ===
- Jack Lang, French politician - Jury President
- Hark Bohm, German actor and filmmaker
- Férid Boughedir, Tunisian filmmaker and producer
- Maggie Cheung, Hong Kong/Chinese actress and model
- Fred Gronich, American senior executive of the MPAA
- David Hare, British filmmaker and playwright
- Per Holst, Danish producer
- Boleslaw Michalek, Polish screenwriter and film critic
- Humberto Solás, Cuban director and screenwriter
- Marianne Sägebrecht, German actress
- Ning Ying, Chinese filmmaker

== Official Sections ==
=== Main Competition ===
The following films were in competition for the Golden Bear and Silver Bear awards:

English title	Original title	Director(s)	Country
Comanche Territory	Territorio Comanche	Gerardo Herrero	Spain, France, Germany, Argentina
The Crucible		Nicholas Hytner	United States
The English Patient		Anthony Minghella	United States
Four Days in September	O que é isso, companheiro?	Bruno Barreto	Brazil
Get on the Bus		Spike Lee	United States
Genealogies of a Crime	Généalogies d'un crime	Raúl Ruiz	France, Portugal
The Island on Bird Street	Øen i Fuglegaden	Søren Kragh-Jacobsen	Denmark, United Kingdom, Germany
Kitchen	我愛廚房	Yim Ho	Hong Kong, Japan
Life is All You Get	Das Leben ist eine Baustelle	Wolfgang Becker	Germany
In Love and War		Richard Attenborough	United States
Lucie Aubrac		Claude Berri	France
Miss Nobody	Panna Nikt	Andrzej Wajda	Poland
Moonlight Serenade	瀬戸内ムーンライト・セレナーデ	Masahiro Shinoda	Japan
The People vs. Larry Flynt		Miloš Forman	United States
Port Djema		Eric Heumann	France, Italy, Greece
The River	河流	Tsai Ming-liang	Taiwan
Romeo + Juliet		Baz Luhrmann	United States
Rosewood		John Singleton	United States
Secrets of the Heart	Secretos del corazón	Montxo Armendáriz	France, Portugal, Spain
Smilla's Feeling for Snow		Bille August	Denmark, Germany, Sweden
Surveillance	埋伏	Huang Jianxin	China
Three Stories	Три истории	Kira Muratova	Russia, Ukraine
Twin Town		Kevin Allen	United Kingdom
Under Western Eyes	לנגד עיניים מערביות	Joseph Pitchhadze	Israel
Viva Erotica	色情男女	Tung-Shing Yee	Hong Kong

== Official Awards ==
=== Main Competition ===
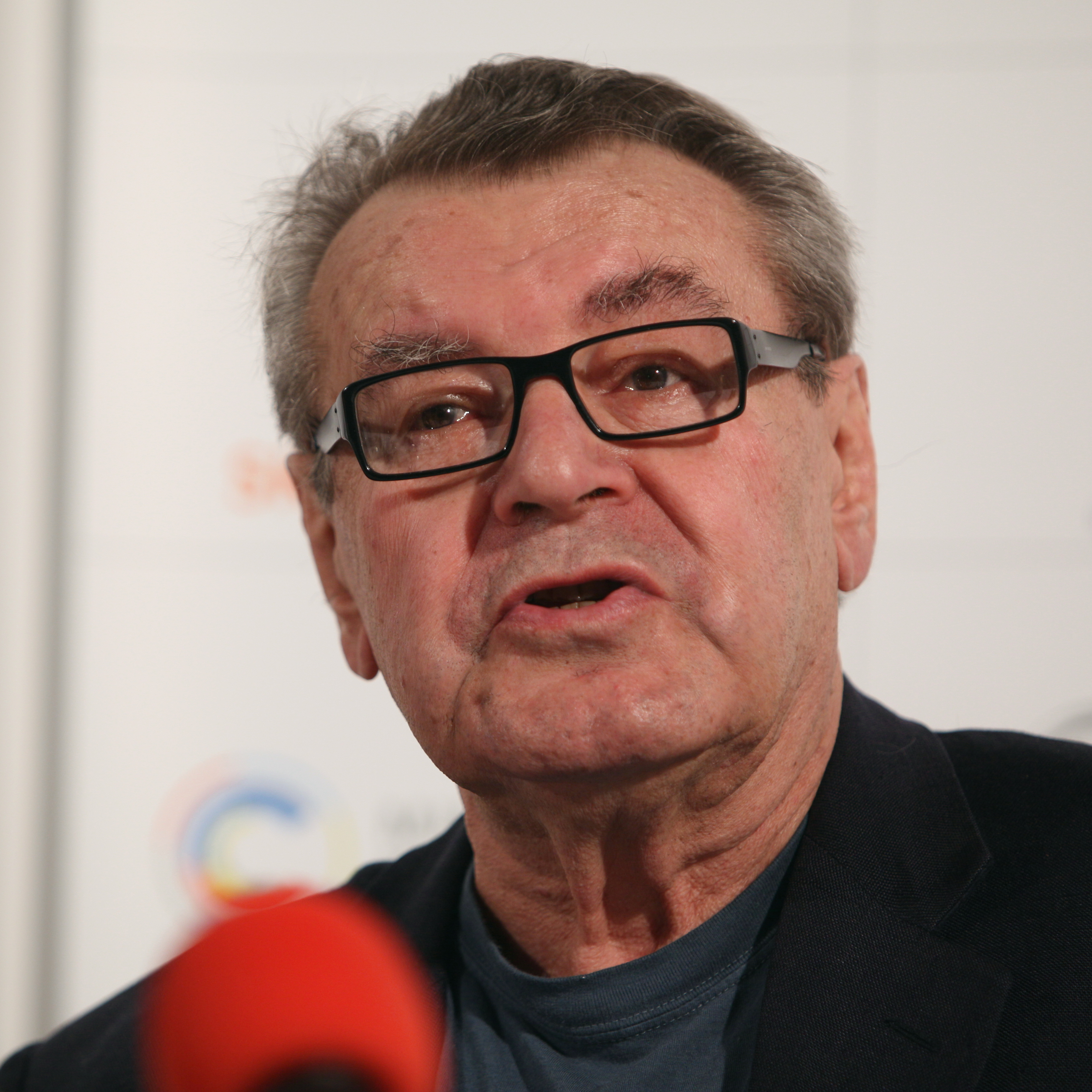
Miloš Forman, winner of the Golden Bear at the festival

The following prizes were awarded by the Jury:

- Golden Bear: The People vs. Larry Flynt by Miloš Forman
- Silver Bear Special Jury Prize: The River by Tsai Ming-liang
- Silver Bear for Best Director: Eric Heumann for Port Djema
- Silver Bear for Best Actress: Juliette Binoche for The English Patient
- Silver Bear for Best Actor: Leonardo DiCaprio for Romeo + Juliet
- Silver Bear for an Outstanding Single Achievement: Zbigniew Preisner for The Island on Bird Street
- Silver Bear for an Outstanding Artistic Contribution: Raúl Ruiz for Généalogies d'un crime
- Alfred Bauer Prize: Romeo + Juliet
- Honourable Mention:
  - Jordan Kiziuk for The Island on Bird Street
  - Life is All You Get by Wolfgang Becker
  - Anna Wielgucka for Miss Nobody
  - Get on the Bus by Spike Lee

=== Honorary Golden Bear ===
- Kim Novak

=== Berlinale Camera ===
- Lauren Bacall
- Ann Hui
- Armin Mueller-Stahl
- Franz Seitz

== Independent Awards ==
=== Blue Angel Award ===
- Secretos del corazón by Montxo Armendáriz
