= Miss Nobody (1996 film) =

1996 Polish film

- Directed by: Andrzej Wajda
- Written by: Tomasz Tryzna; Radoslaw Piwowarski
- Produced by: Janusz Morgenstern
- Starring: Anna Wielgucka
- Cinematography: Krzysztof Ptak
- Release date: 25 October 1996
- Running time: 98 minutes
- Country: Poland
- Language: Polish

Miss Nobody (Polish: Panna Nikt) is a 1996 Polish drama film directed by Andrzej Wajda. It was entered into the 47th Berlin International Film Festival where Anna Wielgucka won an Honourable Mention.

== Cast ==
- Anna Wielgucka as Marysia Kawczak
- Anna Mucha as Kasia Bogdanska
- Anna Powierza as Ewa
- Stanisława Celińska as Ewa
- Jan Janga-Tomaszewski as Marysia's Father
- Malgorzata Potocka as Ewa's Mother
- Leszek Teleszyński as Ewa's Father
- Małgorzata Pieczyńska as Kasia's Mother
- Anna Romantowska as Form Tutor
- Adam Siemion as Tadzio, Marysia's Brother
