= Life Is All You Get =

1997 film

- Directed by: Wolfgang Becker
- Written by: Tom Tykwer; Wolfgang Becker
- Produced by: Stefan Arndt
- Starring: Jürgen Vogel
- Cinematography: Martin Kukula
- Distributed by: Senator Film
- Release date: 22 February 1997
- Running time: 115 minutes
- Country: Germany
- Language: German

Life Is All You Get (German: Das Leben ist eine Baustelle) is a 1997 German comedy film directed by Wolfgang Becker. It was entered into the 47th Berlin International Film Festival where it won an Honourable Mention. Joe Leydon of Variety praised the film as "an extremely engaging tale of life and love in a city where everything appears to be in a state of flux", and described it as "a smartly written and sharply observed comedy-drama. At its frequent best, pic has a fresh and larky charm that's reminiscent of fondly remembered French New Wave romances."

A literal translation of the German title is "Life Is A Construction Site".

== Cast ==
- Jürgen Vogel as Jan Nebel
- Christiane Paul as Vera
- Ricky Tomlinson as Buddy
- Meret Becker as Moni
- Christina Papamichou as Kristina
- Martina Gedeck as Lilo
- Armin Rohde as Harri
- Rebecca Hessing as Jenni
- Andrea Sawatzki as Sylvia
- Frank-Michael Köbe as Zivi 1 / Undercover Police Officer #1
- Rainer Werner as Zivi 2 / Undercover Police Officer #2
- Uwe Richter as Polizist 1 / Police Officer #1
- Frank Kessler as Polizist 2 / Police Officer #2
- Oliver Heschke as Polizist 3 / Police Officer #3
