= The Conjugal Bed (1963 film) =

1963 film by Marco Ferreri

- Theatrical release poster
- Italian: L'ape regina
- Directed by: Marco Ferreri
- Screenplay by: Rafael Azcona; Marco Ferreri; Diego Fabbri; Pasquale Festa Campanile; Massimo Franciosa
- Story by: Rafael Azcona; Marco Ferreri
- Produced by: Henryk Chrosicki; Alfonso Sansone
- Starring: Ugo Tognazzi; Marina Vlady; Linda Sini; Riccardo Fellini; Igi Polidoro; Achille Majeroni; Nino Vingelli; Walter Giller
- Cinematography: Ennio Guarnieri
- Edited by: Lionello Massobrio
- Music by: Teo Usuelli
- Production companies: Sancro Film; Fair Film; Les Films Marceau-Cocinor
- Distributed by: Incei Film (Italy); Cocinor (France)
- Release date: 24 April 1963 (Italy)
- Running time: 88 minutes
- Countries: Italy; France
- Language: Italian

The Conjugal Bed (Italian: L'ape regina, lit. 'The Queen Bee') is a 1963 comedy-drama film directed by Marco Ferreri. It was entered into the 1963 Cannes Film Festival where Marina Vlady won the award for Best Actress.

== Plot ==
A wealthy car dealer called Alfonso decides to get married with Regina, a quiet devoted Catholic girl, introduced to him by a friend. After the wedding, she reveals having a strong sexual appetite but only aimed at conceiving a baby. After getting pregnant the bride loses any interest in Alfonso.

== Cast ==
- Ugo Tognazzi as Alfonso
- Marina Vlady as Regina
- Walter Giller as Father Bariaco
- Linda Sini as Mother Superior
- Riccardo Fellini as Riccardo
- Igi Polidoro as Igi
- Nino Vingelli
- Achille Majeroni as Aunt Mafalda
