= Riccardo Fellini =

Italian actor, film director and screenwriter

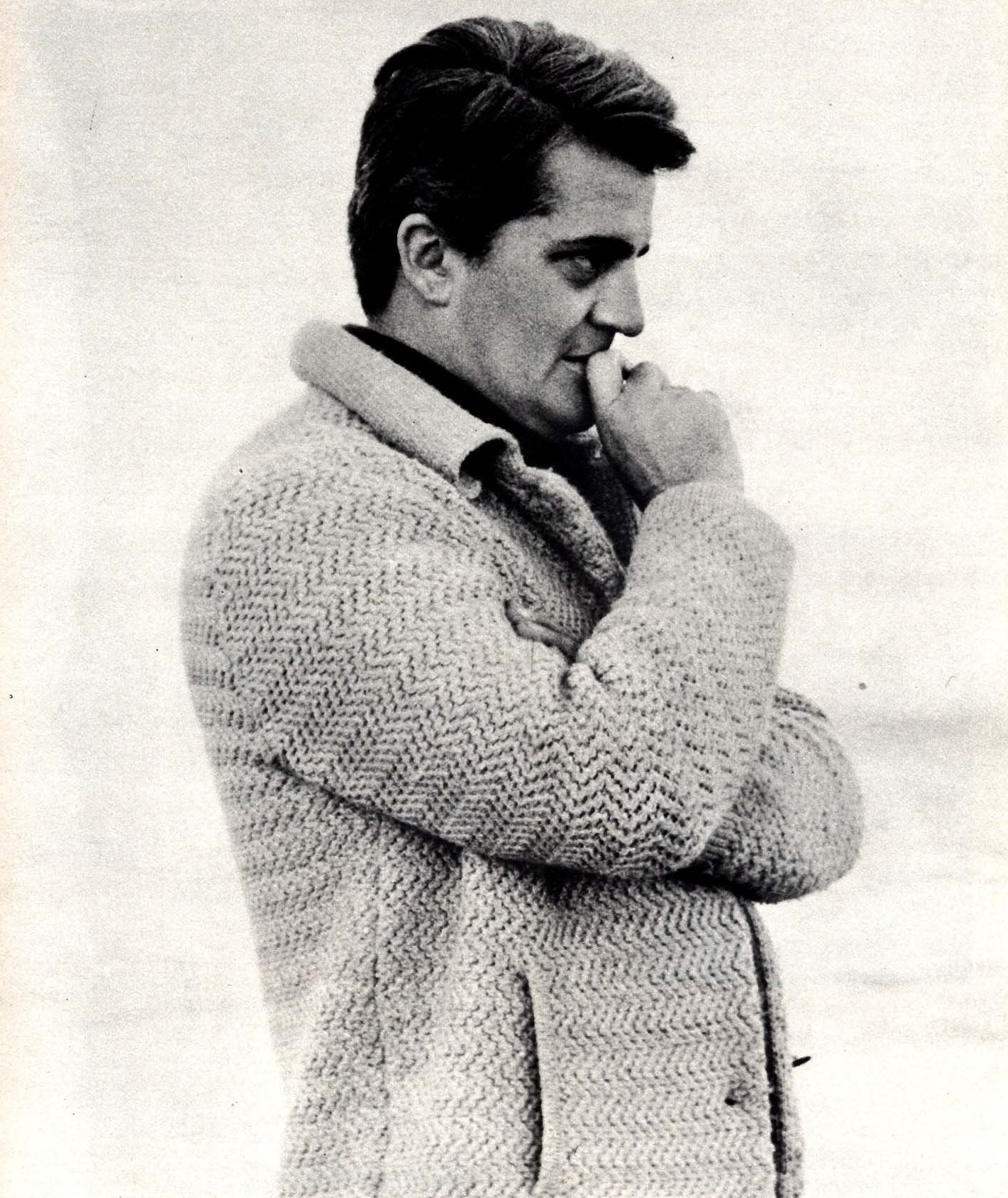
- Born: 21 February 1921; Rimini, Emilia-Romagna, Italy
- Died: 26 March 1991 (aged 70); Rome, Lazio, Italy
- Occupations: Actor, Director

Riccardo Fellini ( 21 February 1921 - 26 March 1991) was an Italian film actor. He also worked as a director on documentaries for RAI. He was the brother of the director Federico Fellini and starred in his 1953 film I Vitelloni. His younger sister was the actress Maddalena Fellini.

== Filmography ==
Year	Title	Role	Notes
1942	The Three Pilots	Un allievo aviere	Uncredited
1943	Apparition	Un amico di Franco	Uncredited
1943	Farewell Love!	Un amico di Luigi	
1944	The Children Are Watching Us	Riccardo	Uncredited
1953	I Vitelloni	Riccardo	
1954	The Cheerful Squadron	Il soldato Bonaparte	
1956	Symphony of Love	Kupelweiser	
1956	I vagabondi delle stelle	Tonino	
1957	Nights of Cabiria		Uncredited
1958	Città di notte		
1959	Il padrone delle ferriere	Max de Tremblay	
1961	Latin Lovers		(segment "Infedeltà coniugale, L'")
1963	The Conjugal Bed	Riccardo	(final film role)

== Bibliography ==
- Mitchell, Charles P. The Great Composers Portrayed on Film, 1913 through 2002. McFarland, 2004.
