= Surveillance (1997 film) =

1997 film

- Film poster
- 埋伏
- Directed by: Huang Jianxin; Yang Yazhou
- Written by: Yi'an Sun
- Starring: Gong Feng; Shan Jiang; Rujun Ten
- Production company: Xiaoxiang Productions (China) Ltd.
- Release date: 1997
- Running time: 93 minutes
- Country: China
- Language: Mandarin

Surveillance (Chinese: 埋伏; pinyin: Máifú) is a 1997 Chinese comedy film directed by Huang Jianxin. It was entered into the 47th Berlin International Film Festival.

== Synopsis ==
Two employees of a security sector of a shipping yard help the police to keep watch on a murder suspect.

== Cast ==
- Gong Feng as Ye Minzhu
- Shan Jiang as Bai Lin
- Rujun Ten as Tian Gongshun (as Rujun Teng)
- Xiaotong Zhang as Yang Gao
