= Anna Mucha =

Polish actress

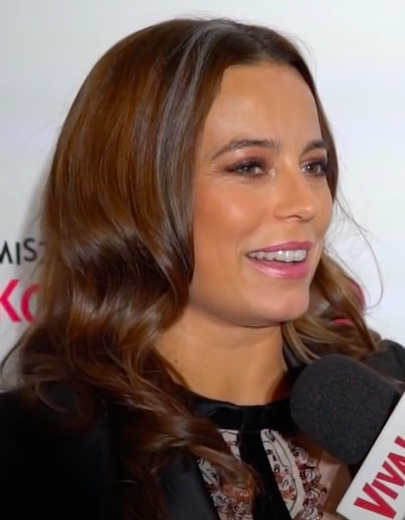
- Mucha in 2018
- Born: Anna Maria Mucha; 26 April 1980 (age 46); Warsaw, Poland
- Citizenship: Poland
- Education: Lee Strasberg Theatre and Film Institute
- Occupation: Actress
- Years active: 1990–present
- Spouse: Marcel Sora (m. 2010)
- Children: 2

Anna Maria Mucha (born 26 April 1980) is a Polish actress. She is best known to Western audiences as Danka Dresner in Steven Spielberg's 1993 film Schindler's List. In Poland, she is known for her regular role in the soap opera L for Love (2003–present).

A 2009 winner of Poland's Dancing with the Stars, she was a judge on the country's version of So You Think You Can Dance called You Can Dance – Po prostu tańcz! in 2010.

== Life and career ==
Mucha was born and grew up in Warsaw. She graduated from Stefan Batory High School in 1999.

In 1990, she was cast as Sabinka in Andrzej Wajda's film Korczak about Polish-Jewish humanitarian Janusz Korczak. Her most important role came in 1993 when she was cast as Danka Dresner in Steven Spielberg's film Schindler's List. She followed it with roles in the films Miss Nobody (1996) directed by Wajda, Młode wilki 1/2 (1997) and Life as a Fatal Sexually Transmitted Disease (2000) directed by Krzysztof Zanussi. In 2000, she portrayed a prostitute named Lili in the film Boys Don't Cry, after which she did not appear in movies for the next 10 years.

Since 2003, Mucha has been a member of the main cast of the soap opera L for Love. She posed nude for the October 2009 issue of Playboy Poland. That year, she won season 10 of Poland's Dancing with the Stars with professional Rafał Maserak. In 2010, she was a judge on season 5 of the Polish version of So You Think You Can Dance called You Can Dance – Po prostu tańcz!. In 2011, she returned to cinema screens with a role in the comedy film Och, Karol 2. She was also cast as the lead in the 2011 television series Prosto w serce.

== Filmography ==
Year(s)	Title	Role	Notes
1990	Korczak	Sabinka	
1990	Femina	Girl	
1991	Przeklęta Ameryka	Karolina Szymańska	
1992	Kuchnia polska	Anna Biesiekierska	1 episode
1992	Sprawa kobiet (Le Violeur Impuni)	Agnes	
1993–94	Bank nie z tej ziemi	Hania	Episode: "Dar Hermesia"
1993	Schindler's List	Danka Dresner	
1995–98	Matki, żony i kochanki	Klara	
1996	Miss Nobody	Kasia Bogdańska	
1997	Młode wilki 1/2	Anna	
1999	Na dobre i na złe	Kinga Radwańska	Episode: "Siostrzana miłość"
2000	Life as a Fatal Sexually Transmitted Disease	Secretary	
2000	Boys Don't Cry	Lili	
2001	Marszałek Piłsudski	Wanda Juszkiewiczówna	1 episode
2003–present	L for Love	Magda Marszałek	
2008	Jak oni śpiewają	Herself	Season 4 contestant
2009	Teraz albo nigdy!	Olga	6 episodes
2009	Taniec z gwiazdami	Herself	Season 10 contestant (winner)
2010	Usta usta	Anita	5 episodes
2010	You Can Dance – Po prostu tańcz!	Herself	Season 5 judge
2011	Och, Karol 2	Mira	
2011	Prosto w serce	Monika Milewska	Main role
2013-2014	Monsters vs. Aliens	Susan Murphy / Ginormica	Polish dubbing
2015	Uwikłani	Iza	Episode: "Iza. W obronie własnej"
2015	O mnie się nie martw	Zuzanna Szałaj	5 episodes
2015	Nie rób scen	Herself	Episode: "Randka"
2016	Pitbull. Nowe porządki	Kinia	
2019	Miszmasz czyli kogel mogel 3	Bożena	
2019	Za marzenia	Miss Gabi	8 episodes
2019	To był rok!	Herself	Season 1 panellist
2020	W rytmie serca	Karolina Bednarska	2 episodes
2020	Dance Dance Dance	Herself	Season 2 judge
2021	Komisarz Mama	Klara	2 episodes
2021	Miłość, seks i pandemia	Kaja	Film
2022	Miłość, seks i pandemia	Kaja	Miniseries
2022	Koniec świata, czyli kogel-mogel 4	Bożena	
2022	Niewidzialna wojna	Ewa	Film
2023	Niewidzialna wojna	Ewa	Miniseries

== Taniec z gwiazdami ==
Mucha competed in the 10th season of Polish Dancing with the Stars – Taniec z gwiazdami with professional Rafał Maserak, and was voted the winner in the final.

Week #	Dance/Song	Judges' score				Result
Week #	Dance/Song	Pavlović	Wodecki	Tyszkiewicz	Galiński	Result
1	Waltz / "Dancing like Lovers"	8	8	9	8	No elimination
2	Rumba / "Time After Time"	9	9	10	10	Safe
3	Tango / "El Tango de Roxanne"	10	10	10	10	Safe
4	Foxtrot / "Hello"	10	10	10	10	Safe
5	Samba / "La Mucura"	8	9	10	8	Safe
6	Quickstep in American Smooth / "Back In Town"	10	10	10	9	Safe
7	Jive / "Rockin' Robin"	5	8	8	5	Safe
8	Viennese waltz / "Noce i dnie"	10	10	10	10	Safe
9	Cha-cha-cha / "Easy Lover"; Waltz / "Dobranoc"	10; 10	10; 10	10; 10	10; 10	Safe
10	Paso Doble / "Paso Royale"; Foxtrot / "As Time Goes By"	10; 10	10; 10	10; 10	10; 10	Safe
11; Semi-finals	Tango / "Hey Sexy Lady"; Salsa / "Coge La Botella"	10; 10	10; 10	10; 10	10; 9	Bottom two
12; Finals	Rumba / "Time After Time"; Quickstep in American Smooth / "Back In Town"; Freestyle / "Niech żyje bal"	10; 10; 10	10; 10; 10	10; 10; 10	10; 10; 10	Winner
