= Natasza Urbańska =

Polish actress, singer, and dancer

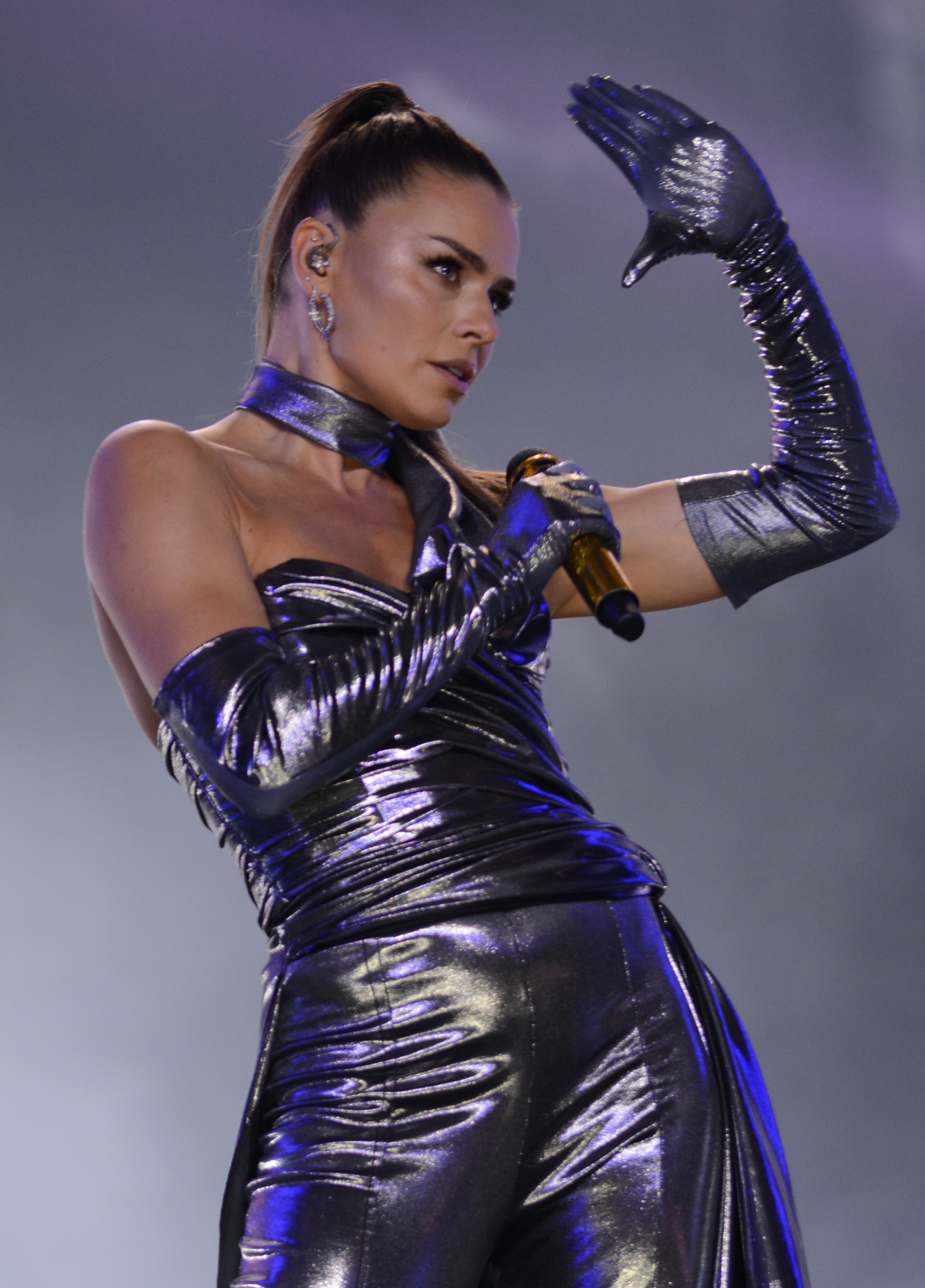
- Urbańska in 2022
- Born: 17 August 1977 (age 49); Warsaw, Poland
- Years active: 1993–present
- Spouse: Janusz Józefowicz (m. 2008)
- Children: 1

Natasza Urbańska (born 17 August 1977) is a Polish actress, singer, dancer, and TV presenter.

== Filmography ==
Year	Title	Role
1997	Sztos	dziewczyna w restauracji "Baron"
2005–2007	Fala zbrodni	Silene Arbekajte-Nawrocka
2011	Battle of Warsaw 1920	Ola Raniewska
2020	365 Days	Anna
2022	365 Days: This Day	Anna
2024–2025	The Voice Kids	Coach

== Discography ==
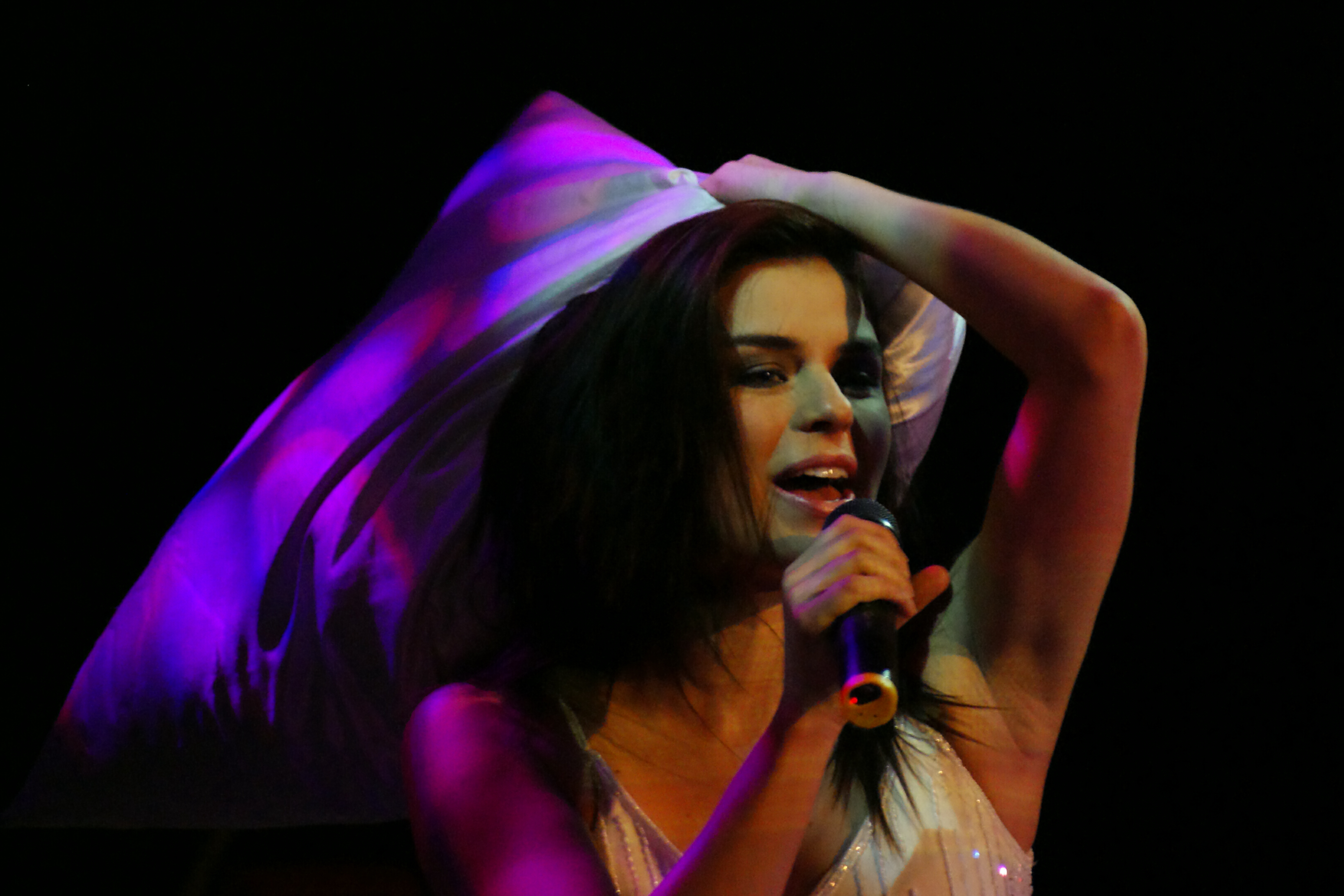
Natasza Urbanska on stage

=== Albums ===
- 2008: Balkanika - Balkan Koncept
- 2009: Hity Buffo vol. 1 - Natasza Urbanska
- 2014: One
- 2021: Rajd 44

=== Singles ===
- 2015: "Hipnotyzuj mnie".
- 2014: "Escamillo".
- 2014: "Rolowanie".
- 2013: "Muszę odejść".
- 2011: "All The Wrong Places"
- 2010: "Here I Am"
- 2010: "Listen To My Radio".
- 2010: "Love Stone Crazy".
- 2009: "Mała".
- 2008: "Już nie zapomnisz mnie".
- 2008: "Blow over".
- 2008: "Wierne Róże".
- 2008: "Rozbaw Mnie".
- 2007: "I Like It Loud".

== Taniec z Gwiazdami ==
Natasza Urbańska participated in the 10th season of Polish Dancing with the Stars - Taniec z Gwiazdami. She has the highest average score in history of the show - 39.18 out of 40 and the most perfect scores - 11 out of her 17 dances got 40 points.

Week #	Dance/Song	Judges' score				Result
Week #	Dance/Song	Pavlović	Wodecki	Tyszkiewicz	Galiński	Result
1	Cha-cha-cha / "Street Life"	9	10	10	9	No elimination
2	Quickstep / "Get Out of Your Lazy Bed"	7	10	10	8	Safe
3	Jive / "Let's Twist Again"	10	10	10	10	Safe
4	Foxtrot / "Fever"	9	10	10	10	Safe
5	Samba / "Bailando"	10	10	10	10	Safe
6	Waltz in American Smooth / "Sunrise, Sunset"	10	10	10	9	Safe
7	Paso Doble / "Smooth Criminal"	10	10	10	10	Safe
8	Waltz / "Moon River"	9	10	10	8	Safe
9	Rumba / "Cose Della Vita"; Foxtrot / "Come Fly with Me"	10; 9	10; 10	10; 10	10; 9	Safe
10	Argentine Tango / "Tormenta Instrumental Tango"; Cha-cha-cha / "Czy czuje pani cza-czę"	10; 10	10; 10	10; 10	10; 10	Safe
11; Semi-finals	Salsa / "Atrevida"; Viennese Waltz / "Trędowata"	10; 10	10; 10	10; 10	10; 10	Safe
12; Finals	Samba / "Bailando"; Argentine Tango / "Tormenta Instrumental Tango"; Freestyle / "Who Wants to Live Forever"	10; 10; 10	10; 10; 10	10; 10; 10	10; 10; 10	Runner-up
