= Donusa =

1992 Greek film

- Directed by: Angeliki Antoniou
- Written by: Angeliki Antoniou
- Produced by: Joachim von Vietinghoff; Frank Hoffer
- Starring: André Hennicke; Christina Papamichou; Dimitris Poulikakos; Tasso Kavadia; Christos Tsagas; Eva Kotamanidou; Gerasimos Skiadaressis
- Cinematography: Pio Corradi
- Edited by: Giannis Tsitsopoulos
- Music by: Nikos Kypourgos
- Production companies: Von Vietinghoff Filmproduktion; Kyros Film
- Distributed by: Look Now! Spentzos Film; Basis Film Verleih; Metropolis Film World Sales ( Zürich)
- Release date: December 4, 1992 (Switzerland)
- Running time: 87 minutes
- Countries: Germany, Switzerland, Greece
- Languages: Greek, German

Donusa is a 1992 German-Swiss-Greek drama film written and directed by Angeliki Antoniou.

The film was shot on the island of Kythira. The role of Eleni was performed by Christina Papamichou and the role of Stefan by Andre Hennicke. The film was premiered in the 45th Locarno International Film Festival 1992 - Section International Competition - in August 1992 and won the 1st Prix de la Jeunesse. It has participated since then in many other prestigious international festivals (among others Mar del Plata International Film Festival, Hof International Film festival, Göteborg International Film Festival , Valladolid International Film Festival, Max Ophüls Festival Saarbrücken, Thessaloniki International Film Festival.

The film was released in Germany, Switzerland, and Greece.

== Plot ==
The arrival of a stranger on a small and remote island in the Aegean has the effect of uncovering a family tragedy. The closed male society covers up incest and rape, making the women into mute accomplices. It takes the death of a girl and the persecution of the stranger to finally break the silence.

== Cast ==
- André Hennicke as Stefan
- Hristina Papamihou as Eleni
- Dimitris Poulikakos as Stelios
- Tasso Kavadia as Sophia
- Christos Tsagas as Tasos
- Eva Kotamanidou as Niki
- Gerasimos Skiadaresis as Mougos
- Katerina Linardi as Anna

== Release ==
The film premiered in August 1992 at the Locarno Film Festival.

The film was released in Switzerland (December 4, 1992), Greece (February 19, 1993) and Germany (February 24, 1994).
