= Huang Jianxin =

Chinese filmmaker (born 1954)

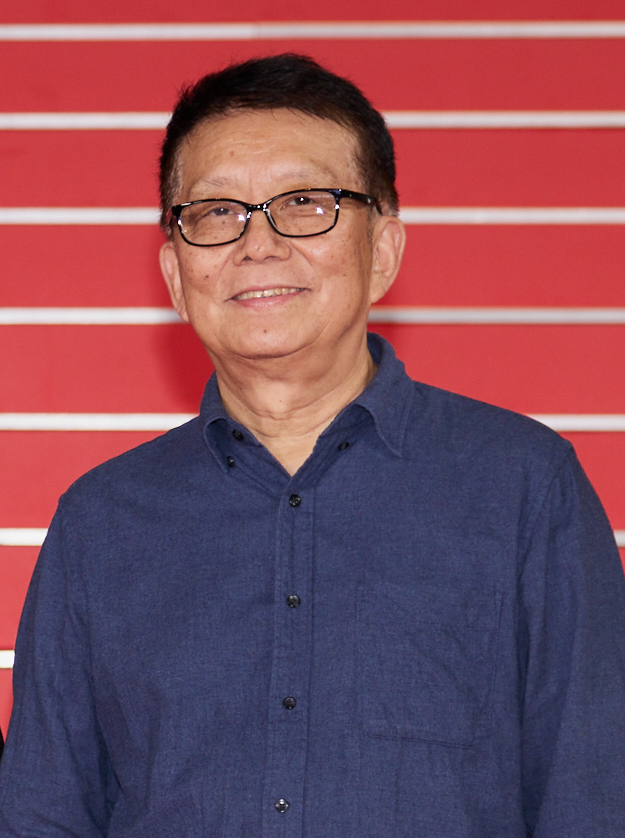
- Huang at the 30th Busan International Film Festival in 2025
- Born: June 14, 1954 (age 72); Xi'an, Shaanxi, China
- Other name: Huang Xin
- Education: Northwest University
- Occupations: Film director; film producer; screenwriter; actor
- Years active: 1985–present
- Children: Huang Lei (黄雷)
- Awards: Golden Rooster Award for Best Director

Chinese name
- Traditional Chinese: 黃建新
- Simplified Chinese: 黄建新
Transcriptions
Standard Mandarin
- Hanyu Pinyin: Huáng Jiànxīn

Huang Xin
- Traditional Chinese: 黃欣
- Simplified Chinese: 黄欣
Transcriptions
Standard Mandarin
- Hanyu Pinyin: Huáng Xīn

Huang Jianxin (born 14 June 1954) is a Chinese filmmaker. He also writes film scripts under the pen name Huang Xin. He is normally considered part of the fifth generation of Chinese filmmakers (a group that includes Chen Kaige, Zhang Yimou and Tian Zhuangzhuang), due to shared traits in his works, although he was not a strictly a member of the inaugural 1982 class of the Beijing Film Academy. Additionally, Huang's films are distinguished from his contemporaries in that they focused on urban contemporary life, as contrasted to historical dramas, as well as for their satirical observations of the Chinese bureaucracy.

== Biography ==
Huang was born in Xi'an, though his ancestral hometown was in Hebei. He joined the army at age 16, and enrolled in Northwest University in 1975. Huang entered Xi'an Film Studio after graduation, evolving from editor, script holder, assistant director to vice director. After training at Beijing Film Academy in 1983, he was elevated to director. He is now the manager of 4th production company of China Film Corporation. His 1997 film Surveillance was entered into the 47th Berlin International Film Festival.

== Filmography ==
As director
Year	English title	Chinese title	Notes/Summary
1985	The Black Cannon Incident	黑炮事件	
1986	Dislocation	错位	Also known as The Stand-In. The film's protagonist, a robotics engineer who has become a manager, creates a robot in his own likeness to handle tedious tasks for him. The robot becomes curious about the world and enjoys the power of being a bureaucrat. It threatens to replace the protagonist, who must end the experiment.
1988	Samsara	轮回	Also known as Transmigration.
1992	Stand Straight, Don't Bend Over	站直啰！别趴下	
1994	The Wooden Man's Bride	五魁	
1994	Back to Back, Face to Face	背靠背，脸对脸	
1995	Signal Left, Turn Right	红灯停，绿灯行	
1997	Surveillance	埋伏	
1999	Something About Secret	说出你的秘密	
2000	Xi'an's Finest	睡不着	
2001	The Marriage Certificate	谁说我不在乎	
2005	Gimme Kudos	求求你表扬我	
2009	The Founding of a Republic	建国大业	Co-directed with Han Sanping.
2011	The Founding of a Party	建党伟业	Co-directed with Han Sanping.
2019	Mao Zedong 1949	决胜时刻	
2021	1921		Co-directed with Zheng Dasheng.

As producer
Year	English title	Chinese title	Role
2002	Zhou Yu's Train	周渔的火车	
2003	Love Undercover 2: Love Mission	新扎师妹2	
2005	2 Young	早熟	
2006	A Battle of Wits	墨攻	
2008	All About Women	女人不坏	
2021	The Battle at Lake Changjin	长津湖	
2022	The Battle at Lake Changjin II	长津湖之水门桥	
2025	Gloaming in Luomu	罗目的黄昏	Old Huang
