= Skagerrak (film) =

2003 film

- Directed by: Søren Kragh-Jacobsen
- Written by: Anders Thomas Jensen; Søren Kragh-Jacobsen
- Starring: Iben Hjejle
- Cinematography: Eric Kress
- Release date: 14 March 2003
- Running time: 104 minutes
- Country: Denmark
- Languages: Danish; English

Skagerrak is a 2003 Danish drama film directed by Søren Kragh-Jacobsen. It was entered into the 25th Moscow International Film Festival.

== Cast ==
- Iben Hjejle as Marie
- Bronagh Gallagher as Sophie
- Martin Henderson as Ian / Ken
- Ewen Bremner as Gabriel
- Gary Lewis as Willy
- Simon McBurney as Thomas
- Helen Baxendale as Stella
- James Cosmo as Robert
