= The Island on Bird Street (film) =

1997 Danish drama film

- Directed by: Søren Kragh-Jacobsen
- Written by: John Goldsmith; Tony Grisoni
- Based on: The Island on Bird Street by Uri Orlev
- Produced by: Rudy Cohen; Tivi Magnusson
- Starring: Jordan Kiziuk
- Cinematography: Ian Wilson
- Music by: Zbigniew Preisner
- Distributed by: Showtime (United States)
- Release date: February 1997
- Running time: 107 minutes
- Country: Denmark
- Language: English

The Island on Bird Street (Danish: Øen i Fuglegaden) is a 1997 Danish produced drama film directed by Søren Kragh-Jacobsen. It is based on the novel The Island on Bird Street.

== Cast ==
- Patrick Bergin as Stefan
- Jordan Kiziuk as Alex
- Jack Warden as Boruch
- James Bolam as Doctor Studjinsky
- Stefan Sauk as Goehler
- Simon Gregor as Henryk
- Lee Ross as Freddy
- Suzanna Hamilton as Stasya's Mother
- Sian Nicola Liquorish as Stasya
- Michael Byrne as Bolek
- Heather Tobias as Mrs. Studjinsky
- Leon Silver as Mr. Gryn
- Sue Jones-Davies as Mrs. Gryn
- Nigel John Whitear as Yanek
- Misha Daniel King as Avrum
- Nicole Maria Hann as Tsyppora
- Richard William Pepper as Boy
- Marek Grabowski as Adam
- Phil-Alexander Szalek as Yossi
- Marcin Herman as Joseph
- Pawel Lauterbach as Benny
- Jacek Milczanowski as Yitzak
- Pawt Okonski as Richter
- Leon Niemczyk as Podulski
- Jacek Krautforst as Goehler's Adjutant
- Frank Albrecht as German Soldier
- Jan Blecki as Terrified Man
- Juliusz Chrzastowski as Jewish Policeman
- Katazyna Suszyto as Miriam
- Juilta Wotoszynska as Benny's Mother

== Awards ==
It was entered into the 47th Berlin International Film Festival. Zbigniew Preisner won the Silver Bear for an outstanding single achievement and Jordan Kiziuk won an Honourable Mention.
