= Iga Wyrwał =

Polish actress and former glamour model

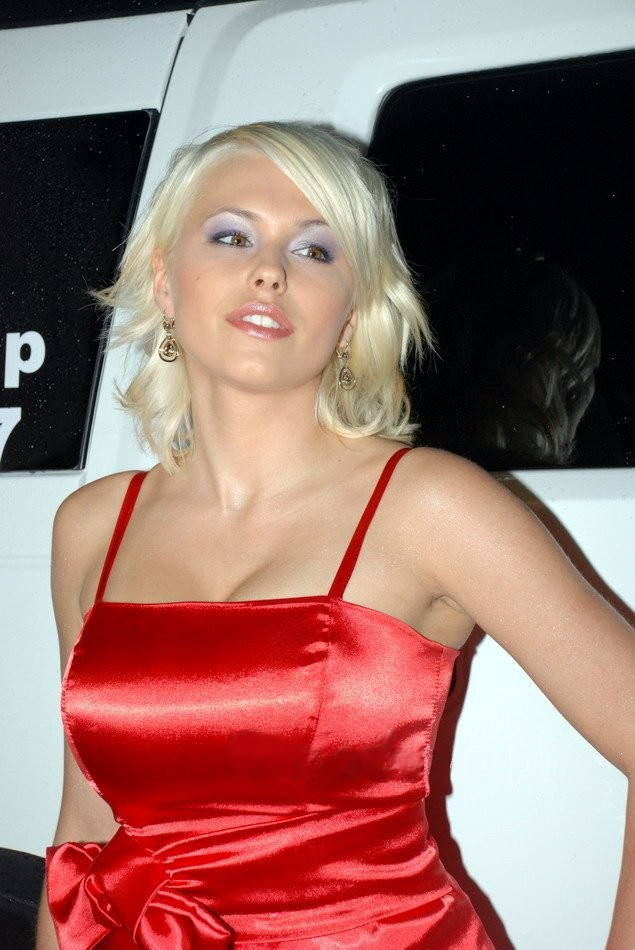
- Wyrwał at CKM Magazine's 10th Birthday, July 2008
- Born: 20 February 1989 (age 37); Kalisz, Poland
- Other names: Eva; Iga A
- Occupations: Actress; glamour model
- Modelling information
- Height: 5 ft 6 in (1.68 m)
- Hair colour: Brown/blonde
- Eye colour: Brown/hazel

Iga Wyrwał ([ˈiɡa ˈvɨrvaw]; born 20 February 1989), also known as Eva or Eve, is a Polish actress and former glamour model.

== Career ==
In 2006, Wyrwał moved from Poland to Rugby, Warwickshire in England. In 2008, she was signed as a cover girl for Nuts magazine. She was introduced in April of that year as "the sexiest new babe in Britain", and later that month was ranked first in the magazine's "100 Sexiest Topless Babes 2008" list.

Wyrwał has appeared in various men's magazines, including Front, the Polish edition of Playboy and CKM. She has appeared in many shoots for various websites, including MET-Art, Breathtakers and Onlytease; and she has been featured in the UK national newspaper Daily Star as a Page 3 girl.

In 2009, Wyrwał appeared on Season 10 of Taniec z Gwiazdami, the Polish edition of Strictly Come Dancing, finishing 11th.

In 2011, she played Regina, second wife of the Dwarf King, in the American stoner comic fantasy film Your Highness, starring Danny McBride, James Franco and Natalie Portman.

== Personal life ==
In January 2009, Wyrwał announced that she was pregnant. The father of the child was reported to be BBC graphic designer Martin Fausek.

== See also ==
- Lad culture
- Lad mag
- The Sun newspaper
