= Angeliki Antoniou =

Greek film director and screenwriter

- Born: 12 July 1956 (age 70); Athens, Greece
- Education: School of Architecture at the Aristotle University of Thessaloniki- German Film and Television Academy in Berlin (DFFB)
- Occupations: Film director, screenwriter, producer
- Website: angelikiantoniou.com

Angeliki Antoniou (Greek: Αγγελική Αντωνίου, born 12 July 1956) is a Greek film director, screenwriter and producer. She studied architecture in Greece and film direction at the German Film and Television Academy in Berlin. She works as scriptwriter and director in Greece and in Germany. In 2006 she taught film direction at the Film School of University in Thessaloniki. She lives in Athens and Berlin. She has directed feature films and documentaries which have been screened and awarded in prestigious international festivals (Locarno, Berlinale, Göteborg, Montreal, Palm Springs, Moscow, Thessaloniki etc.) and distributed world-wide.

Her critically acclaimed feature film Eduart based upon true events, participated in more than 40 film festivals, including the 29th Moscow International Film Festival, and has received 18 awards in Greece, France, the US and the UK..Eduart was selected by the EFA for the 2007 European Film Awards and it was Greece's submission for Best Foreign Film 2008.

== Filmography (selection) ==
=== Director and screenwriter ===
- Persephone (1987)
- Gefangene des Meeres ("Prisoners of the Sea") (1989)
- Donusa (1992)
- Tänze der Nacht ("Dances of the Night") (1996)
- Verspielte Nächte ("Nights, Gambled Away") (1997)
- Heimlicher Tanz ("Secret Dance") (1999)
- Allein unter Männern ("Alone Among Men") (2000)
- Messerscharf ("Sharp Like a Knife") (2001)
- Eduart (2006)
- The Unknown Athenians (2020)
- Green Sea (2020)

=== Screenwriter ===
- Das Glück sei Unbeweglichkeit (1990)

=== Producer ===
- Eduart (2006)
- The Unknown Athenians (2020)
- Green Sea (2020)

=== Co-producer ===
- Verspielte Nächte ("Nights, Gambled Away") (1997)

=== Awards and nominations (selection) ===
- 1992: Nominated for Pardo d' Oro (Golden Leopard) at the Locarno International Film Festival for Donusa
- Youth Jury Award for Best Film (A' Prix de la Jeunesse) for Donusa
- 1992: Nominated for the Golden Alexander at the Thessaloniki International Film Festival for Donusa
- 1997: Nominated for the Golden Alexander at the Thessaloniki International Film festival for Verspielte Nächte(Nights Gambled Away)
- 1997: Greek Film Awards for Best Film & Best Director (Angeliki Antoniou) & Best Screenplay (Angeliki Antoniou and Kriton Kalaitzidis) & for Best Actress (Jasmin Tabatabai) for Verspielte Nächte (Nights Gambled Away)
- 1997: Award for Best Set Design at Hof International Film Festival for Verspielte Nächte
- 2006: Winner of 9 Greek State Film Awards, at the Thessaloniki International Film Festival among them for Best Film & Best Director & Best Screenplay (Angeliki Antoniou) for Eduart
- FIPRESCI Award at the Thessaloniki International Film Festival for Best Greek Film for Eduart
- 2007: Selected by the European Film Academy for the 2007 European Film Awards, Eduart
- 2007: Golden Antigone Award (Antigone d'or de la Ville et de l'Agglomération de Montpellier) at the Montpellier International Mediterranean Film Festival & Special mention by the Young People's Award (CMCAS) for Eduart
- 2007: Nominated for the Competitive Section, "Europe-Europe" at the Sevilla International Film Festival, for Eduart
- 2007: Nominated for the Golden St. George at the Moscow International Film Festival, for Eduart
- 2007: Nominated for Grand Prize at the Tallinn Black Nights Film Festival, for Eduart
- 2008: Special Recognition for Best Ensemble Cast at The Method Fest Film Festival, for Eduart
- Greece's submission for an Oscar Nomination for Best Foreign Film 2008 for Eduart
- 2020: Nominated for the Golden Alexander (International Competition) at the Thessaloniki Documentary Festival, for The Unknown Athenians
- 2020: Audience Award at the Kitzbühel Film Festival for Green Sea
- 2021: Award for Best Greek Documentary at the AegeanDocs International Documentary Film Festival for The Unknown Athenians
- 2021: Efebo d'Oro «Ande» Cinema Donna Award at the Efebo d'Oro (International Competition) for Green Sea
- 2021: Hellenic Film Academy Award for Best Documentary for The Unknown Athenians
