= Wolfgang Becker (director, born 1954) =

German filmmaker (1954–2024)

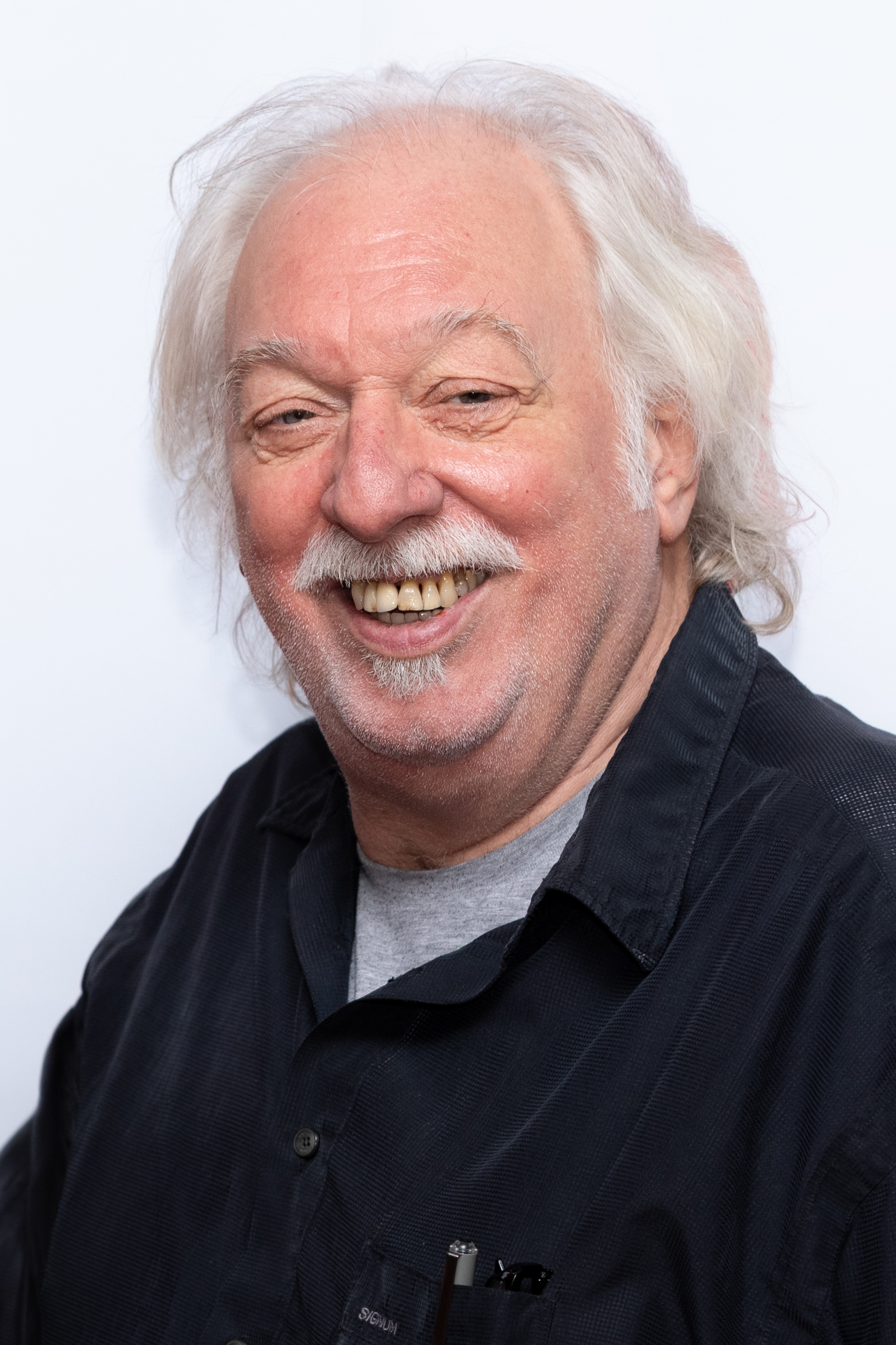
- Becker at the Berlinale in 2020
- Born: 22 June 1954; Hemer, North Rhine-Westphalia, West Germany
- Died: 12 December 2024 (aged 70); Berlin, Germany
- Occupations: Film director; screenwriter

Wolfgang Becker (German pronunciation: [ˈvɔlfɡaŋ ˈbɛkɐ]; 22 June 1954 – 12 December 2024) was a German film director and screenwriter, best known to international audiences for his work Good Bye, Lenin! (2003). He was a co-founder of the production company X Filme Creative Pool, which produced his first successful feature film, Das Leben ist eine Baustelle, in 1997.

== Early life and education ==
Wolfgang Becker was born on 22 June 1954 in Hemer, North Rhine-Westphalia, West Germany. He studied German, History and American Studies at the Free University in Berlin.

== Career ==
In 1980, Becker landed a job at a sound studio and later enrolled at the German Film and Television Academy (DFFB). In 1983 he started work as a freelance cameraman graduating from the DFFB in 1986 with Schmetterlinge (Butterflies), which won the Student Academy Award in 1988, the Golden Leopard at the Locarno International Film Festival, and the Saarland Prime-Minister's Award at the 1988 Filmfestival Max Ophüls Preis Saarbrücken.

Becker directed an episode of the television drama Tatort, titled "Blutwurstwalzer". He made his second feature Kinderspiele (Child's Play) in 1992. He created a documentary the same year, Celibidache, about Sergiu Celibidache returning to conduct the Berlin Philharmonic after 38 years.

In 1994, Becker co-founded the production company X Filme Creative Pool with Tom Tykwer, Stefan Arndt, and Dani Levy. He worked with Tykwer on the Berlinale competition feature Das Leben ist eine Baustelle (Life Is All You Get, 1997).

Becker was a founding member of the Deutsche Filmakademie in 2003. He was a member of the jury at the Venice Film Festival in 2004.

Becker's biggest success was the 2003 film Good Bye, Lenin!, with over 6 million viewers. The short film Ballero was produced for the 2006 FIFA World Cup draw ceremony and broadcast worldwide on television.

Becker completed his final film, Der Held vom Bahnhof Friedrichstraße, in October 2024, shortly before his death; it was released in December 2025.

== Personal life ==
Becker was married and had a daughter. He died in Berlin on 12 December 2024 after a severe illness, at the age of 70.

== Filmography ==
Year	Title	Director	Writer	Actor	Notes
1988	Schmetterlinge	Yes	Yes	No	
1991	Tatort (TV series)	Yes	No	No	1 episode, "Blutwurstwalzer"
1992	Child's Play (Kinderspiele)	Yes	Yes	No	
1992	Sergiu Celibidache: The Triumphant Return	Yes	No	No	Documentary about Sergiu Calibidache
1997	Life Is All You Get (Das Leben ist eine Baustelle)	Yes	Yes	Yes	
2003	Good Bye, Lenin!	Yes	Yes	No	Co-writer
2004	Welcome to São Paulo (Bem-Vindo a São Paulo)	Yes	Yes	No	Segment
2005	Ballero	Yes	Yes	No	
2009	Germany 09: 13 Short Films About the State of the Nation	Yes	Yes	No	Segment "Krankes Haus"
2015	Me and Kaminski	Yes	Yes	No	
2025	Der Held vom Bahnhof Friedrichstraße	Yes	Yes	No	

== Awards ==
- 1997 Berlin International Film Festival, Honourable Mention for Das Leben ist eine Baustelle
- 1998 Bavarian Film Awards, Best Production, for Das Leben ist eine Baustelle
- 2003 Berlin International Film Festival, Blue Angel for Good Bye Lenin!
- 2003 European Film Awards, Audience Award for Best Director for Good Bye Lenin!
- 2004 Goya Awards, Best European Film for Good Bye Lenin!
- 2004 Bavarian Film Awards, Audience Award for Good Bye Lenin!
- 2004 César Awards, Best European Union Film for Good Bye Lenin!
