= Child's Play (1992 film) =

1992 film

- Directed by: Wolfgang Becker
- Written by: Wolfgang Becker; Horst Johann Sczerba
- Produced by: Barrie M. Osborne
- Starring: Jonas Kipp; Burghart Klaußner; Angelika Bartsch; Oliver Bröcker; Detlev Buck
- Release date: 1992
- Running time: 107 minutes
- Country: Germany
- Language: German

Child's Play, also known as Kinderspiele, is a 1992 German film directed by Wolfgang Becker.

== Plot ==
Micha, a young boy being beaten by his abusive father, joins other bullies at school to terrorize people for amusement, including his own brother.
