= Under Western Eyes (1996 film) =

1996 film

- Directed by: Joseph Pitchhadze
- Written by: Joseph Pitchhadze
- Produced by: Joseph Pitchhadze
- Starring: Giora Asaulov
- Cinematography: Shai Goldman
- Release date: 1996
- Running time: 95 minutes
- Country: Israel
- Language: Hebrew

Under Western Eyes (Hebrew: Leneged Einayim Ma'araviyot) is the first feature film written, directed, and produced by Joseph Pitchhadze. It was released in 1996 and stars Ezra Kafri and Eyal Shechter, with cinematography by Shai Goldman. It was shot in black and white.

The film tells the story of a young man of Russian descent who is searching for his father, who escaped from a security prison after being accused of spying for the Soviet Union.

The film was entered into the 47th Berlin International Film Festival.

== Synopsis ==
A tragicomedy, the film tells the story of Gary Razumov, a young architect living in Berlin, disconnected from his past. He is suddenly informed of his father's death and returns to his homeland. Upon arrival, he discovers that his father, Roma, a former scientist who was imprisoned for twenty years for espionage on behalf of the Soviet Union, is not dead but escaped from prison. Wolf, a violent and obsessive Shin Bet agent, along with his young assistant Karmi, make it clear to Gary that he cannot leave the country until his father is found. Gary meets a young woman named Tom, and together they embark on a journey to find his father, while Wolf and Karmi pursue them. Throughout the journey, Gary is forced to confront his traumatic past.

== Cast ==
Actor Name	Character
Giora Asaulov	Singer
Fitcho Ben-Zur	Yoshual
Carmel Betto	Carmi
Pavel Citronal	Igor's Father
Amnon Fisher	Actor
Liat Glick	Tom
Yochanan Harison	
Ezra Kafri	Wolf
Yehuda Lazarovitch	Igor
Ludmila Loben	Liza
Ricardo Rojstaczer	
Eyal Shehter	Gary Razumov
Gideon Shemer	Itzhak
Galina Swidansky	Igor's Mother

== Reception ==
Per Oliver Leaman, the film received favorable reviews. David Stratton reviewed Under Western Eyes for Variety, writing that "Shot in grainy black-and-white, apart from a few color inserts purportedly filmed as home movies on a super-8 camera, the film contains nods to Tarantino, Wenders and Antonioni, but falls far short of the best work of any of them."

=== Awards ===
- Wolgin Award at the Jerusalem Film Festival (won)
- Jury Award at the Berlin Film Festival (1997, won)
- Jury Award at the Belgrade Festival of Auteur Films (1997, won)
