= Michal (singer) =

Polish singer (born 1983)

Michał Kwiatkowski
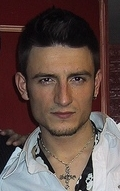
- Michal in 2007

Background information
- Also known as: Michal
- Born: 12 November 1983 (age 42); Gorzów Wielkopolski, Poland
- Genres: pop
- Occupation: singer
- Instrument: piano
- Years active: 2001–present
- Label: My Music

Michał Kwiatkowski (Polish pronunciation: [ˈmixaw kfjatˈkɔfskʲi]; born 12 November 1983) is a Polish singer. In France, he is better known as Michal.

== Biography ==
Kwiatkowski was born and raised in Gorzów Wielkopolski. In 2001, Michał won a Polish talent show Szansa na sukces (Shot at the Top). After this success, he left Poland and started his studies in France. In 2003, he competed in the third series of the popular show Star Academy. His popularity increased rapidly. He gained second place, but winner Elodie Frégé shared the victory with him.

From September 2009 he was a member of X edition in Dancing with the Stars in Poland. His partner was Janja Lesar. They were eliminated in 11th episode, placing third.

== Personal life ==
In December 2012, Michal publicly came out as gay in an interview with French magazine Tele Loisir. He has been in a relationship with a pop singer and artistic director Bixente Simonet.

== Discography ==
=== Studio albums ===
Title	Album details	Peak chart positions		
Title	Album details	FRA	BEL	POL
De l’or et des poussières	Released: 2004; Label: Mercury France; Formats: CD, digital download	22	22	−
All Alone with My Gueule	Released: 12 December 2007; Label: Mercury France; Formats: CD, digital download	85	−	−
What's Your Name?	Released: 15 November 2011; Label: Lovarium; Formats: CD, digital download	−	−	−
Chopin etc.	Released: 14 October 2014; Label: My Music; Formats: CD, digital download	−	−	44
Cicha noc / Douce nuit	Released: 16 December 2017; Label: My Music; Formats: CD, digital download	−	−	−

=== Singles ===
Year	Single	Chart positions		
Year	Single	FR	CH	BEL(wal)
2004	Tu mets de l'or	#18	#69	#12
2004	Viens jusqu'à moi (feat. Elodie Frégé)	#8	#30	#5
2005	Mon tout	#50	-	#40
2006	All Alone With Your Gueule	#68	-	-
