= Maddalena Fellini =

Italian actress and writer (1929–2004)

- Born: Maria Maddalena Fellini; 7 October 1929; Rimini, Kingdom of Italy
- Died: 21 May 2004 (aged 74); Rimini, Italy
- Occupation: Actress

Maria Maddalena Fellini (7 October 1929 – 21 May 2004) was an Italian actress and writer. She was also well known for being the sister of Federico Fellini. Her other brother was the actor and television director Riccardo Fellini.

== Life and career ==
Born in Rimini, at an early age Fellini started acting into amateur dramatics, and at 19 years old she was planning to enroll the Silvio D'Amico National Academy of Dramatic Art in Rome, before being dissuaded by her family and eventually renouncing to her aspirations following her 1953 marriage with a doctor.

In 1987, she was the leading actress in a dialectal play, Stal mami by Liliano Faenza, which got her unexpected attention and critical praises. In 1990 she made her film debut in the Marco Tullio Giordana's segment of the anthology film Especially on Sunday, getting critical acclaim for her role of a lonely mother spying on the intimate moments of her son and his wife.

Fellini was also an occasional writer, being the author of a humorous autobiography (Storie di una casalinga straripata, 1992) and of a cookbook filled with autobiographical anecdotes (A tavola con Federico Fellini, 2003). In 1995, she created an association with the aim to honor her brother Federico Fellini through a series of initiatives, The Fellini Foundation, of whom she was honorary president until her death.
