= Søren Kragh-Jacobsen =

Danish film director, musician, and song writer

- Born: 2 March 1947 (age 79); Copenhagen, Denmark
- Years active: 1978–present

Søren Kragh-Jacobsen (Danish: [ˈsœːɐ̯n̩ ˈkʰʁɑˀw ˈjɑkʰʌpsn̩]; born 2 March 1947) is a Danish film director, musician, and songwriter.

He was one of the founders and practitioners of the Dogme95 project, for creating films without artificial technology or techniques.

== Early career ==
Kragh-Jacobsen was born in Copenhagen and started out as a musician in Denmark, before attending film school in Prague. After returning to Denmark, he directed and co-wrote television productions.

He became one of the developers of the avant-garde film-making project Dogme95, based on creating films based only on reality, without artificial lighting and technology.

== Career ==
His first feature film was Wanna See My Beautiful Navel? (1978). This was followed by the successful Rubber Tarzan (1981), Thunderbirds (1983), Emma's Shadow (1988), Shower of Gold (1988), The Boys from St. Petri (1991), The Island on Bird Street (1997), and his international break-through, dogme No. 3 Mifune's Last Song (1999), and Skagerrak (2003). Mifune's Last Song won the Silver Bear – Special Jury Prize at the 49th Berlin International Film Festival. Skagerrak was entered into the 25th Moscow International Film Festival. He has done some commercials and Danish/Swedish TV series.

Acclaimed internationally, he has received several major awards for his work, including the Memorial François Truffaut Award/Giffoni, an Emmy for The Island on Bird Street and a Silver Bear at the Berlinale film festival in Berlin for Mifune's Last Song. The Boys from St. Petri was screened out of competition at the 1992 Cannes Film Festival.

== Marriage and family ==
Kragh-Jacobsen is married to musician Cæcilie Nordgreen. They live in Copenhagen with their two children.

== Filmography ==
=== Film ===
Director

- Oh, To Be a Butterfly (2020)
- The Hour of the Lynx (2013)
- What No One Knows (2008)
- Skagerrak (2003)
- Mifune's Last Song (1999)
- The Island on Bird Street (1997)
- The Boys from St. Petri (1991)
- Shower of Gold (1988)
- Emma's Shadow (1988)
- Thunderbirds (1983 film) (1983)
- Wanna See My Beautiful Navel? (1978)

Script

- Granny's House (1984)

Documentary appearances

- Det danske dogmeri (2005)
- The Purified (2002)

Script consultant

- The Flyer (1996)
- The Miracle in Valby (1989)

Lyrics

- The Monkeys and the Secret Weapon (1995)
- Circus Hildebrandt (1995)
- Jungledyret Hugo (1993)

Music

- War of the Birds (1990)

=== Television ===
Director

- Borgen (2010)
- The Protectors (2008)
- The Eagle (2004)
- D-Dag (2001) (TV film)
- Livet er en god grund (1985) (TV film)

Script

- Omsen og Momsen (1987) (TV film)
- Ude på noget (1984)
