= List of Swiss submissions for the Academy Award for Best International Feature Film =

Best International Feature Film submissions from Switzerland

Highlights
- Debut: 1961
- Submissions: 54
- Nominations: 5
- Oscar winners: 2

Switzerland has submitted films for the Academy Award for Best International Feature Film (Note: The category was previously named the Academy Award for Best Foreign Language Film, but this was changed to the Academy Award for Best International Feature Film in April 2019, after the Academy deemed the word "Foreign" to be outdated.) since their first entry in 1961. The award is handed out annually by the United States Academy of Motion Picture Arts and Sciences to a feature-length motion picture produced outside the United States that contains primarily non-English dialogue. The Swiss submission is decided annually by the Federal Office for Culture.

As of 2026, Switzerland has been nominated five times, winning twice for Dangerous Moves (1984) and Journey of Hope (1990).

== Submissions ==
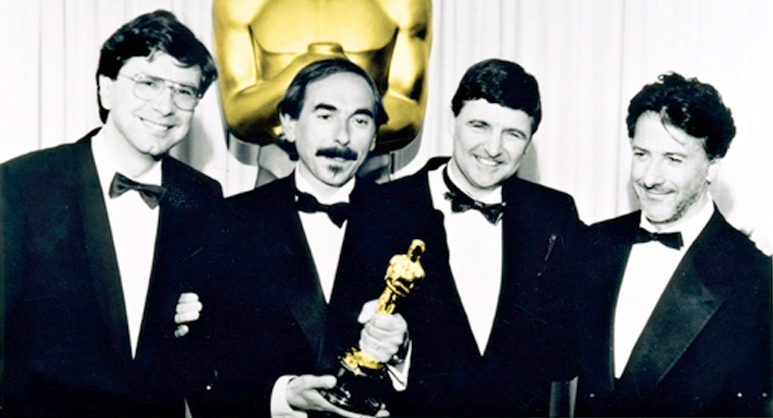
Xavier Koller won the award for Journey of Hope.

The Academy of Motion Picture Arts and Sciences has invited the film industries of various countries to submit their best film for the Academy Award for Best International Feature Film since 1956. The International Feature Film Committee oversees the process and reviews all the submitted films. Following this, they vote via secret ballot to determine the five nominees for the award.

Since they began submitting regularly in 1972, they have only failed to enter a film on three occasions: 1977, 1978 and 2003. In 1994, the Swiss entered but were disqualified in a controversial ruling in which AMPAS determined that one of the favorites, Krzysztof Kieslowski's Three Colours: Red, was not a majority Swiss production.

Filmmaker Alain Tanner had had his films selected five times, but none have been nominated. Xavier Koller and Swiss-based French filmmaker Jean-Luc Godard have each been selected to represent Switzerland three times.

The country won twice, for Dangerous Moves (1984) and Journey of Hope (1990). The latter was also its last nominated film in the category. Other nominated films include: First Love (1970), L'Invitation (1973), and The Boat Is Full (1981).

Vitus (2006), Sister (2012), My Life as a Courgette (2016), and Late Shift (2025), advanced to the December shortlists, but were not nominated.

My Life as a Courgette (2016) was nominated in the Best Animated Feature Film category instead.

Switzerland has four official languages. Twenty-two of the Swiss submissions have been French-language films, while fourteen were in some variety of German, and only one in Italian, but none have been in Romansh. In addition, films in other languages have also been selected, including the 1990s winner Journey of Hope, which was mainly in Turkish.

Below is a list of the films that have been submitted by Switzerland for review by the academy for the award by year and the respective Academy Awards ceremony.

Year (Ceremony)	Film title used in nomination	Original title	Language(s)	Director	Result
1961 (34th)	The Shadows Grow Longer	Die Schatten werden länger	German	Ladislao Vajda	Not nominated
1970 (43rd)	First Love	Erste Liebe	German	Maximilian Schell	Nominated
1972 (45th)	La Salamandre		French	Alain Tanner	Not nominated
1973 (46th)	L'Invitation		French	Claude Goretta	Nominated
1974 (47th)	The Middle of the World	Le Milieu du monde	French	Alain Tanner	Not nominated
1975 (48th)	Confrontation	Konfrontation	Swiss German	Rolf Lyssy	Not nominated
1976 (49th)	Jonah Who Will Be 25 in the Year 2000	Jonas qui aura 25 ans en l'an 2000	French	Alain Tanner	Not nominated
1979 (52nd)	Les petites fugues	Les petites fugues	French	Yves Yersin	Not nominated
1980 (53rd)	Every Man for Himself	Sauve qui peut (la vie)	French	Jean-Luc Godard	Not nominated
1981 (54th)	The Boat Is Full	Das Boot ist Voll	German	Markus Imhoof	Nominated
1982 (55th)	Yol		Turkish, Kurdish	Yılmaz Güney & Şerif Gören	Not nominated
1983 (56th)	In the White City	Dans la ville blanche	French	Alain Tanner	Not nominated
1984 (57th)	Dangerous Moves	La Diagonale du fou	French	Richard Dembo	Won Academy Award
1985 (58th)	Alpine Fire	Höhenfeuer	Swiss German	Fredi Murer	Not nominated
1986 (59th)	Tanner	Der Schwarze Tanner	Swiss German	Xavier Koller	Not nominated
1987 (60th)	If the Sun Never Returns	Si le soleil ne revenait pas	French	Claude Goretta	Not nominated
1988 (61st)	La Méridienne		French	Jean-François Amiguet	Not nominated
1989 (62nd)	My Dear Subject	Mon cher sujet	French	Anne-Marie Miéville	Not nominated
1990 (63rd)	Journey of Hope	Reise der Hoffnung	Turkish, Swiss German, Italian	Xavier Koller	Won Academy Award
1991 (64th)	Der Berg		German	Markus Imhoof	Not nominated
1992 (65th)	Off Season	Hors Saison	French	Daniel Schmid	Not nominated
1993 (66th)	The Diary of Lady M	Le Journal de Lady M	French	Alain Tanner	Not nominated
1994 (67th)	Three Colours: Red	Trois Couleurs: Rouge	French	Krzysztof Kieślowski	Disqualified
1995 (68th)	Adultery: A User's Guide	Adultère, mode d'emploi	French	Christine Pascal	Not nominated
1996 (69th)	Les Agneaux		French	Marcel Schüpbach	Not nominated
1997 (70th)	For Ever Mozart		French	Jean-Luc Godard	Not nominated
1998 (71st)	War in the Highlands	La Guerre Dans le Haut Pays	French	Francis Reusser	Not nominated
1999 (72nd)	Beresina, or The Last Days of Switzerland	Beresina oder Die letzten Tage der Schweiz	Swiss German	Daniel Schmid	Not nominated
2000 (73rd)	Gripsholm		German	Xavier Koller	Not nominated
2001 (74th)	In Praise of Love	Éloge de l'amour	French	Jean-Luc Godard	Not nominated
2002 (75th)	Aime ton père		French	Jacob Berger	Not nominated
2004 (77th)	Mein Name Ist Bach		German	Dominique de Rivaz	Not nominated
2005 (78th)	Tout un Hiver sans Feu		French	Greg Zglinski	Not nominated
2006 (79th)	Vitus		Swiss German	Fredi Murer	Made shortlist
2007 (80th)	Late Bloomers	Die Herbstzeitlosen	Swiss German	Bettina Oberli	Not nominated
2008 (81st)	The Friend	Der Freund	Swiss German	Micha Lewinsky	Not nominated
2009 (82nd)	Home		French	Ursula Meier	Not nominated
2010 (83rd)	La petite chambre		French	Stéphanie Chuat and Véronique Reymond	Not nominated
2011 (84th)	Summer Games	Giochi d'estate	Italian	Rolando Colla	Not nominated
2012 (85th)	Sister	L'Enfant d'en haut	French	Ursula Meier	Made shortlist
2013 (86th)	More than Honey		German	Markus Imhoof	Not nominated
2014 (87th)	The Circle	Der Kreis	German	Stefan Haupt	Not nominated
2015 (88th)	Iraqi Odyssey		Arabic	Samir	Not nominated
2016 (89th)	My Life as a Courgette	Ma vie de Courgette	French	Claude Barras	Made shortlist
2017 (90th)	The Divine Order	Die göttliche Ordnung	German	Petra Biondina Volpe	Not nominated
2018 (91st)	Eldorado		German	Markus Imhoof	Not nominated
2019 (92nd)	The Awakening of Motti Wolkenbruch	Wolkenbruchs wunderliche Reise in die Arme einer Schickse	German, Yiddish	Michael Steiner	Not nominated
2020 (93rd)	My Little Sister	Schwesterlein	German, French, English	Stéphanie Chuat, Véronique Reymond	Not nominated
2021 (94th)	Olga		French, Ukrainian	Elie Grappe	Not nominated
2022 (95th)	A Piece of Sky	Drii Winter	Swiss German	Michael Koch	Not nominated
2023 (96th)	Thunder	Foudre	French	Carmen Jaquier	Not nominated
2024 (97th)	Queens	Reinas	Spanish	Klaudia Reynicke	Not nominated
2025 (98th)	Late Shift	Heldin	German	Petra Volpe	Made shortlist
2026 (99th)	Who Is Still Alive	Qui vit encore	Arabic	Nicolas Wadimoff	Pending

== Shortlisted Films ==
Year	Films
2014	Dreamland · I Am the Keeper · Keep Rollin' · Left Foot Right Foot
2015	Chubby · Dora or the Sexual Neuroses of Our Parents · No Place to Stay · Pause · Vanity · War
2019	The Innocent · The Reformer. Zwingli: A Life's Portrait. · Those Who Work
2021	Azor · Caged Birds · The Fam · The Girl and the Spider · Lost Island · Monte Verità · Neighbours · Nothing But the Sun
2022	The Black Spider · Continental Drift (South) · A Fleeting Encounter · The Line · Semret · Soul of a Beast · Unrest · The Water
2023	Becoming Giulia · Blackbird Blackbird Blackberry · A Forgotten Man · Last Dance · Let Me Go · Röbi Geht
2024	Dog on Trial
2025	Hanami · The Safe House
2026	Cosmos · Silent Rebellion

== See also ==
- List of Academy Award winners and nominees for Best International Feature Film
- List of Academy Award-winning foreign language films
- Cinema of Switzerland
