= Iraqi Jews in Israel =

Ethnic group

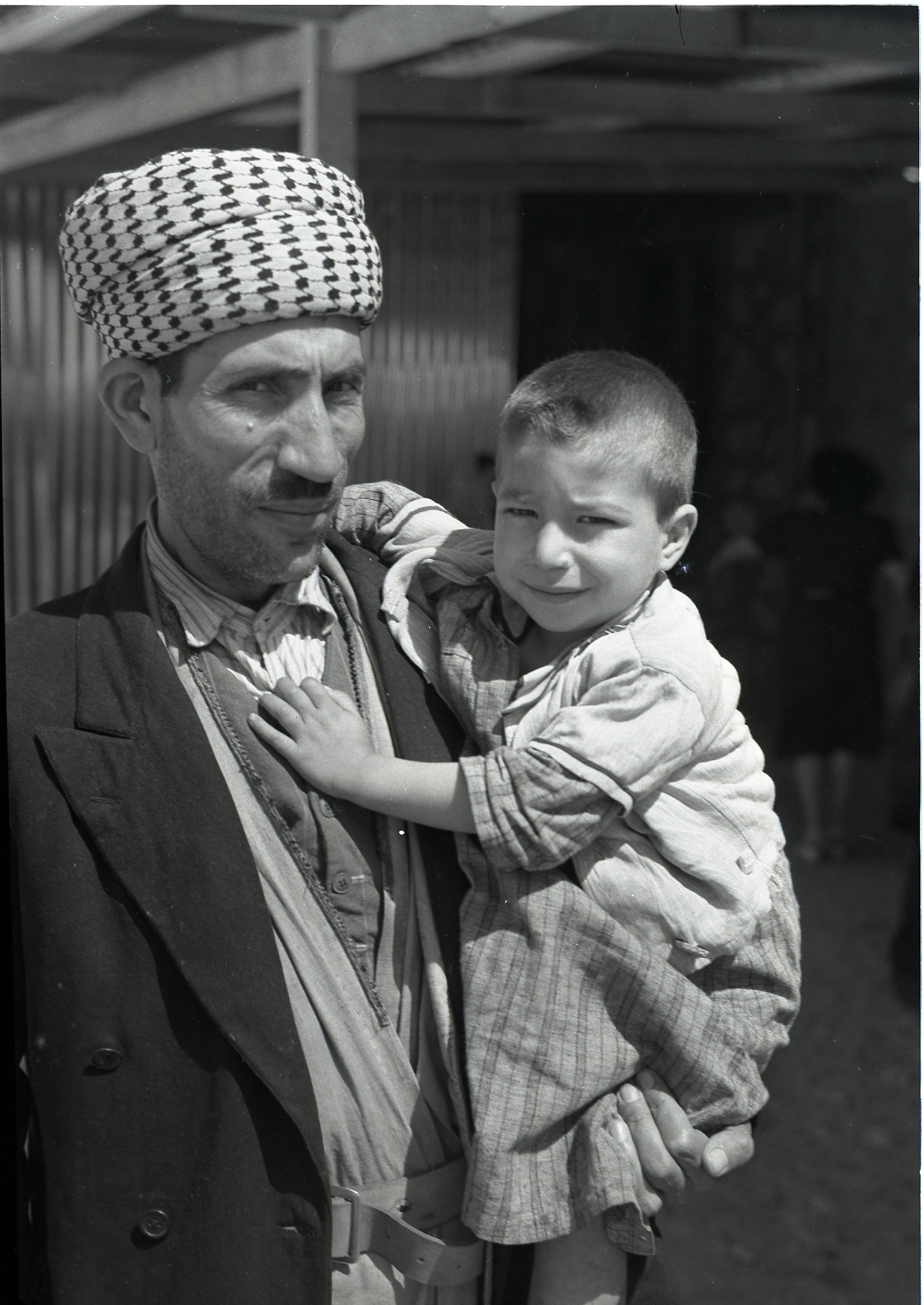

Total population
- 450,000

Regions with significant populations
- Or Yehuda, Ramat Gan, Kiryat Gat

Languages
- Hebrew, Judeo-Iraqi Arabic, Baghdad Jewish Arabic

Religion
- Orthodox Judaism, minority Karaite Judaism.

Iraqi Jews in Israel, also known as the Bavlim (Hebrew for "Babylonians"), are immigrants and descendants of the immigrants of the Iraqi Jewish communities, who now reside in the State of Israel. During Ottoman rule, Iraqi Jews lived under the millet system, which differentiated Muslims from non-Muslims. As such, Iraqi Jews under Ottoman rule enjoyed fewer rights than their Muslim counterparts and were legally discriminated against, but were recognised minorities and granted political representation.

Between 1950 and 1951, an approximated 123,000 Iraqi Jews emigrated to Israel as a consequence of domestic and regional factors. Domestically, the rise of antisemitic policies and rhetoric within Iraq, and the numerous violent attacks against its Jewish community, created a highly precarious environment for Iraqi Jews, pushing many to view emigration to Israel as the only option for their safety. Regionally, tensions within Mandate Palestine, the State of Israel in 1948 and its expulsion of the Palestinians, and its push for Jewish immigration in the years following independence impacted Iraqi Jewish communities. The Iraqi Jewish immigrants lost the Iraqi citizenship, and their properties were confiscated by the Iraqi state. In Israel, Iraqi Jews became full citizens, but encountered numerous difficulties, including discrimination and economic precarity.

== History of Iraqi Jewish Migration to Israel ==
The Jewish communities of Iraq held a religious connection to the Land of Israel, as is documented by archeological findings such as the Al-Yahudu Tablets from the sixth century BCE. However, most Iraqi Jews did not leave for Israel until 1949–51, and remained in the Ottoman provinces of Basra, Mosul, and Baghdad and later British Mandate and independent Iraq, where they had lived for centuries.

=== Jews of late 19th century Ottoman Iraq ===
The Iraqi Jews maintained a positive relationship with the Ottomans in the 19th century, but did not enjoy the same rights as Muslims under the millet system. In 1865, the Jewish community founded the inaugural Jewish school in Iraq, known as al-Etihad School. Subsequently, in 1876, Manheim Danial was elected as the first Jew to the Ottoman Parliament. During the Ottoman period, Iraqi Jews were practicing their religious rituals alongside Iraqi Muslims and Christians and maintained a favourable relationship with other religious communities, engaging in the exchange of currency, gold, and silver. Additionally, some Jews profited from trade and marketing, serving as intermediary merchants between the East (India and China) and the West (Europe) via the al-Basra port on the Persian Gulf.

The Jewish population resided in several cities and towns in Iraq, including Mosul, Kirkuk, Al-Sulaymaniyah, Erbil, Baghdad, and Najaf. Furthermore, the Jewish population in Iraq exceeded that of the Christians, with 87,338 recorded in 1917, of which 50,000 were in Baghdad.

At the onset of World War I, Jews in Iraq faced significant challenges due to reports alleging their support for the United Kingdom in its conflict against the Ottomans. This condition persisted until the conclusion of the war in 1918, when the British troops entered Baghdad.

==== Emergence of Political Zionism ====
By the end of the 19th century, political Zionism entered the consciousness of the Jews of Iraq, leading to the emergence of Zionist activities in Iraq. In 1914, the first Zionist organisation was founded by Menashe Hakim, Maurice Fattal and Raphael Horesh under the name "Zionist Association of Baghdad", to promote the Zionist cause in Mesopotamia. The short-lived organisation collapsed in November of that year when the Ottoman Empire declared war on Britain.

=== The British Mandate of Iraq ===
Upon the British occupation of Baghdad in March 1917, the Jewish community constituted the predominant demographic within the city's populace. The most recent Ottoman official yearbook for the Vilayet of Baghdad reported that the Jewish population was 80,000 out of a total population of 202,000. The relationship between the Jews and King Faisal I was robust; they organised a grand party in his honour upon his ascension to the throne of Iraq in 1921. The king resided at the Manheim Danial palace in Baghdad, and this close association persisted with his son, King Ghazi of Iraq, in 1935. In 1923, the newly established government of Iraq chose Sir Sassoon Eskell as the Minister of Finance, a post he will retain throughout the reign of King Faisal I in the subsequent administration.

During the British mandate period from 1922 to 1932, and until King Faisal's death in 1933, Jews were mostly permitted to pursue their economic, social, and educational development, engaging in politics only superficially. Despite the prevailing tranquilly, dissenting voices emerged, lamenting the Jews' perceived dominance in the economy, their mostly elevated social standing, and their significant over-representation in governmental positions. The initial indications of open sympathy and active support for the Zionist cause within their ranks were not exempt from criticism.

Furthermore, the Alliance Israélite Universelle played a crucial role in the lives of Iraqi Jews. Jews who studied at the institute were highly educated and were often proficient in French and English, which allowed them to access high positions in public service during the British Mandate.

==== Zionism in British Mandate Iraq ====
The extent of Zionism in Iraq begun from 1920 when the first major Zionist organization was founded under the name "Jewish Literacy Society." It published a Hebrew and Judeo-Arabic journal called Yeshurun. Then on March 5, 1921, a branch of the Jewish Literary Society founded a separate Zionist association known as "The Mesopotamian Zionist Society." A revived "Zionist Association of Baghdad" would later merge with this Society in 1924.

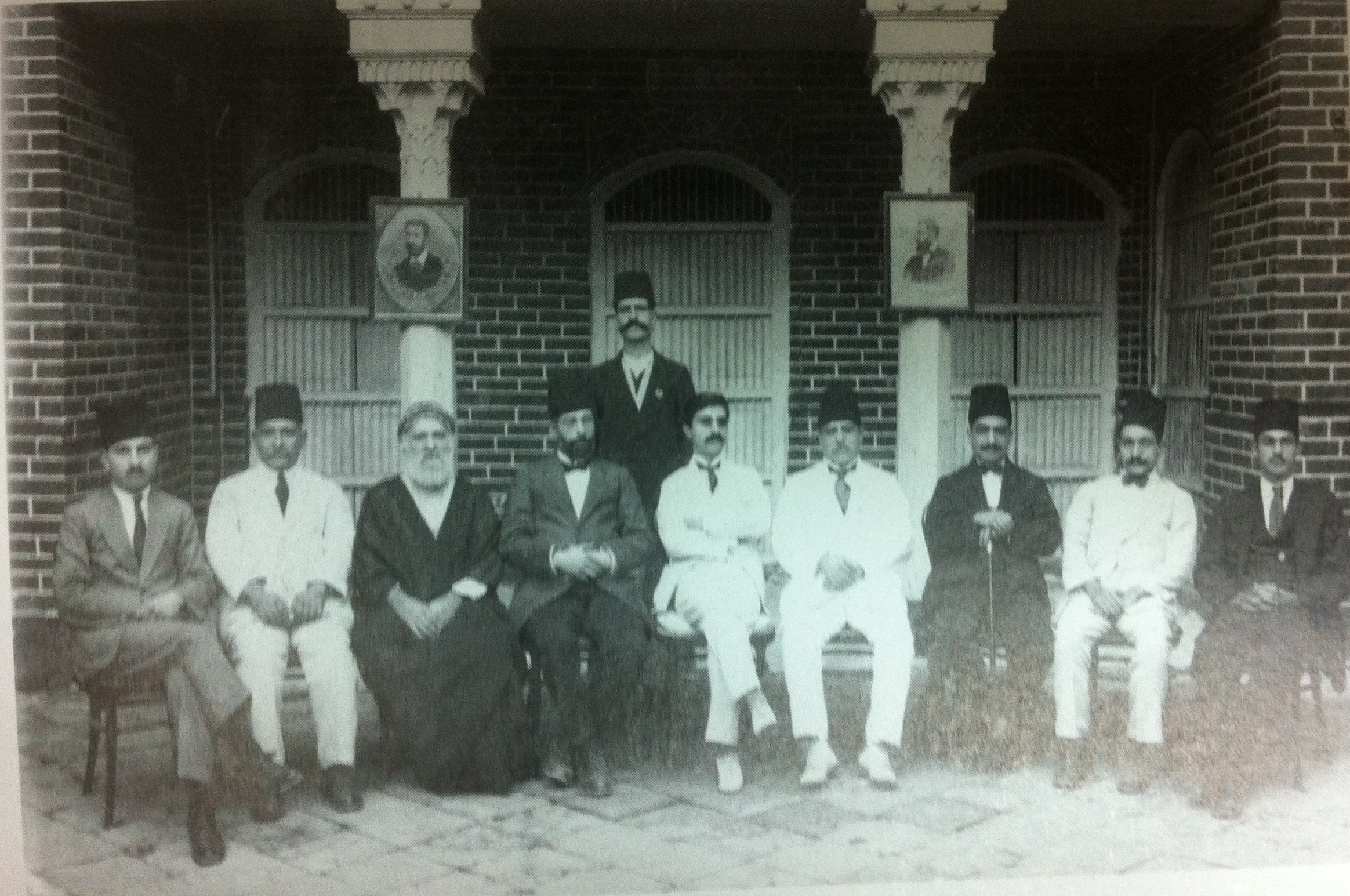
Zionist activists in Baghdad, 1922

In contrast to the elite class of Iraqi Jews who remained unattracted to Zionism, it received considerable support from poorer Jewish citizens who demonstrated their support in multiple public gatherings. These demonstrations led to condemnations by British officials and Arab authorities who warned against public activities. Until 1929, there was no official ban against their activities and Zionist organizations continued to exist discreetly. Alfred Mond's 1928 visit to Baghdad led to the first anti-Zionist demonstration in the city. Multiple Jews were injured in attacks related to the protests. There were other short lived Zionist organizations such as "Agudat Ahi'ever" (1929), "Histadrut ha-No-ar ha-Ivri" (1929), and "Maccabi" (1929–1930). Palestinian Jewish teachers were brought in to teach Hebrew and Jewish history. Some schools of the Alliance Israélite Universelle in Baghdad during this time organised Hebrew literary societies which promoted Zionism. After the 1929 riots, the Iraqi government began a campaign against Zionism. Palestinian Jewish teachers were expelled, and Iraqi Zionist leaders were arrested.

=== The Independent Kingdom of Iraq ===
The situation of Iraqi Jews became particularly unstable after the end of the British Mandate in 1932, particularly during the tenure of Prime Minister Nuri al-Said under King Ghazi of Iraq, who endorsed the Palestinian revolution against Israeli military factions. Following the death of King Ghazi of Iraq and the ascension of King Abd al-Ilah, various political and military movements emerged, with Iraqi groups supporting the Palestinian cause, which would ultimately impact the future of the Jewish community in Iraq.

==== Antisemitism and repression (1932–1945) ====
In the years following independence from the British Mandate, the Iraqi government promoted policies and laws that targeted its Jewish population. Within this period, Arab nationalism became prevalent, in particular forms which considered Iraq a Muslim state, and thus excluded religious minorities. Antisemitic policies prevented Iraqi Jews from fully participating in the labour market through barring Jewish businesses from obtaining licenses, and prohibiting them from public service, the Jewish youth was prevented from entering professional training and thus becoming integrated in the Iraqi labour market. The Iraqi Independence Party, a right-wing Iraqi party that used antisemitic rhetoric, used the German Nazi Party as a model. It used its newspaper outlet to promote anti-Jewish views to the Iraqi public, with the support of the Iraqi government. Nazi rhetoric primarily influenced the Iraqi youth and the military, as well as a few public figures.

The Iraqi state press played a major role in the spread of antisemitic ideas through its publications. Its articles often perpetuated the antisemitic belief that the Iraqi Jewish merchant class controlled the Iraqi economy, and sent their revenues to the Zionist movement in Palestine to create a Jewish state and destroy the pan-Arab movement.

The arrest an imprisonment of prominent Iraqi Jewish businessmen on false charges, such as that of Shafiq Ades, became more prominent, who was ultimately publicly executed by hanging. This increased pressures on Jewish communities, and led to increase in arrests and targeting of Jewish businesses and institutions by government authorities. Quotas were placed in certain sectors, such as universities and high schools, limiting the number of Jews who could have access to higher education. Iraqi Jews, who had previously held high positions within the British Mandate of Iraq, were seen as allies of the British and barring Iraqi Muslims from state service. As such, Iraqi Jews were prevented from accessing education and dismissed from high-placed roles in government and administration.

In addition, the belief that Jewish communities in Iraq were tied to a Zionist network engendered a conflation of Zionism and Judaism, which fostered antisemitic rhetoric and policy. The 1936–1939 Arab revolt in Palestine in particular was key to worsening the situation of Iraqi Jews. While previously some distinction was still made within Iraqi society between Jews and Zionism, the political upheaval in Mandate Palestine fostered a climate which increasingly conflated the two.

==== The Farhud (1941) ====
The Farhud crisis represented the final significant struggle against the Jews during a protracted period of unrest, which began in 1928 when unidentified individuals set fire to many houses, stores, and a synagogue in the Jewish quarter of Baghdad. In September 1933, King Faisal I died, and his son Ghazi ascended to the throne. King Ghazi of Iraq was a feeble ruler and a nationalist zealot, without the experience, innate sagacity, and statesmanship of his father. King Ghazi of Iraq supported the emerging Sunni nationalist forces and allowed them to engage in political activities. Two parallel developments appear to have undermined the position of the Jews at this time: the ascendance of the Nazis in Germany and the emergence of Iraq as a refuge for Arab nationalist activists from Syria and Palestine, who sought sanctuary in the first Arab nation to gain independence from British rule.

Between the 1935 until 1940 an initial indications of an anti-Jewish campaign within the administration emerged, a dismissal of numerous Jewish officials from the Ministry of Economics, and limited number of Jews were accepted into the school, and Hebrew instruction in Jewish schools was reduced, moreover, a travel to Palestine by Jews, including those who applied for visitor visas, became significantly more challenging, additionally, in 1936, the new government led by Yasin al-Hashimi issued a manifesto that accused the Jewish community in Iraq of providing support to the Zionists in Palestine. The Chief Rabbi and leader of the Jewish community, Sassoon Kadoori, along with several prominent Jewish intellectuals, issued statements disassociating themselves and the community from Zionist ambitions in Palestine due to these serious developments. In June 1941, a pro-Axis nationalist revolt led by Rashid Ali al-Gaylani culminated in military intervention by Great Britain. During this period, the Jewish community in Baghdad experienced two consecutive days of pillage and murder. These acts are commonly referred to by the Arabic term Farhud.

The collapse of the Rashid Ali al-Gaylani military movement against King Abd al-Ilah, who was supported by the British, prompted celebrations among the Jewish community for the King's return to Baghdad. This situation was met with discontent by the Arab Iraqi populace, who were supportive of the Palestinians, ultimately contributing to the Farhud crisis in Baghdad. Estimates indicate that between 160 and 180 Jews were killed, with many more injured. Additionally, a larger number of non-Jews, including rioters, security personnel, and Muslims who defended their Jewish neighbours, were also among the deceased and injured. On June 2, the Regent appointed Jamil Al Midfai as Prime Minister, leading to the formation of a cabinet, five days later, a commission of inquiry was established to investigate these events. The effect the Farhud had on the Iraqi Jewish community was tremendous. It added a sense of anxiety among Baghdadi Jews which heavily influenced their relationship with Iraq. It shed a light on the plight of Jews in Arab countries, leading to Iraqi Jews being included in Zionist plans for immigration to establish a Jewish state.

==== Iraqi Jewish Communism and anti-Zionism (1943–1948) ====
Similarly to European Jews, Iraqi Jews were overwhelmingly represented within the Iraqi Communist Party. Iraqi Jews in the ICP argued in favour of an inclusive and equal conception of Iraqi nationalism, including Jewish and other minorities. The conception of Arab Jewish identity was emphasised by Iraqi Jewish communism, highlighting the compatibility of both their Jewish and Arab identities. In part, this was a response to the rising antisemitism as well as the increasingly exclusionary form of Arab nationalism promoted by the right-leaning parties and the Nazi-aligned far right. In addition, the Jewish members of the ICP were committed to wider ideological beliefs of communism, including class struggle and anti-imperialism. Jewish members of the ICP created the Anti-Zionist League in Iraq, aiming to fight the conflation between Zionism and Judaism, which they saw as a danger to the Iraqi Jews. The Iraqi Jews of the Anti-Zionist League espoused strong anti-Zionist beliefs, opposing what they saw as a European colonial project in Palestine which endangered the Jews of the Middle East, and advocated in favour of the Palestinian position. The position of Iraqi Jews within the ICP became most strong between 1945 and 1948, after the party expanded.

In January 1948, many Iraqi Jews participated in the Al-Wathbah uprising, in which the ICP played a key organising role. The uprising opposed Iraqi Prime Minister Nuri al-Said's decision to renew the Anglo-Iraqi Treaty of 1930, which allowed the British government to maintain military presence in Iraq. In addition, the ICP denounced the 1950 Iraqi law allowing for the emigration of Iraqi Jews to Israel based on its anti-Zionist and anti-imperialism stance.

The ICP and its Jewish component were seen as a threat by the Iraqi state. Similarly, Zionist organisations saw Iraqi Jewish communism and anti-Zionism as a threat to the building of a Jewish state. Zionist envoys to Iraq, such as Enzo Sereni, advocated for anti-communist efforts in Iraq to counter this trend.

==== Before emigration (1945–1950) ====
Following several years of relative tranquilly, the Palestine issue emerged, instigating anxiety among Iraqi Jews who began to perceive threats regarding their future. Propaganda against Jews intensified in 1947, becoming especially perilous as the Special Committee on Palestine prepared to announce its decision regarding the partition of Palestine. Following the death of Abd al-Qadir al-Husayni in 1948 near Jerusalem, demonstrations in Iraq resumed, marked by the slogan "Death to the Jews." Later that year, a Jewish synagogue in Baghdad was attacked, and its ritual articles were desecrated. Shortly after the establishment of the State of Israel, the Jewish population was informed that while riots were not anticipated, challenging times lay ahead. Jews were arrested and presented before military courts on various charges, including receiving communications from friends or relatives in Palestine. The same situations persisted in 1949, marked by a renewed wave of searches and arrests of Jews who had been active since before 1946 or were members of Hehalutz, an underground movement promoting Zionist teachings. The oppressive measures significantly eroded the Jews' trust in the government, leading them to consider emigration from Iraq at any cost.

==== The bombings of Baghdad (1950–1951) ====
In the early fifties, a series of bombings targeting the Jewish community of Baghdad occurred. They are generally regarded as the events that triggered the flight of the Baghdadi Jews to Israel, although some have questioned this understanding, arguing that the broader and long-standing context of antisemitism within Iraq, rather than the individual event of the bombings, was responsible for the emigration.

The 1950–1951 Baghdad bombings started with a terrorist attack on the Ghazi Street, a street adjacent to the Jewish quarter of Baghdad, injuring an Iraqi Jewish woman. Subsequently, a café frequented by the Jewish community of Baghdad was targeted by bombings on April 8, 1950, injuring many of the cafés visitors. In addition, on January 14, 1951, the Shemtob Synagogue, located in southern Baghdad was targeted by grenade-throwers. This attack resulted in three deaths, including that of a 12-year-old child, and injured estimated between 19 and 40, many having to go to the hospital Subsequently, on March 19, 1951, the US Information Service building was targeted, as it was an institution frequented by many Iraqi Jews. On the 10th of May and on the 5th and 6th of June 1951, Iraqi Jewish firms were targeted.

The identity and motive of the bombers has been the subject of heavy debate both within the public and academic sphere. Some academics have argued that the culprits were affiliated with the Iraqi Independence Party, responsible for antisemitic campaigns in Iraq. They support this arguments pointing to the Israeli investigation into the case of the bombings, which strongly indicated a link to the Iraqi antisemitic far-right. Others have argued that the bombings were the result of the Iraqi Zionist underground in collaboration with the Israeli Mossad, who targeted Iraqi Jews in order to push them to flee to Israel. While the evidence of this is highly debated, many, including Iraqi Jews, hold this perspective of the events.

=== Exodus of Iraqi Jews (1950–1952) ===
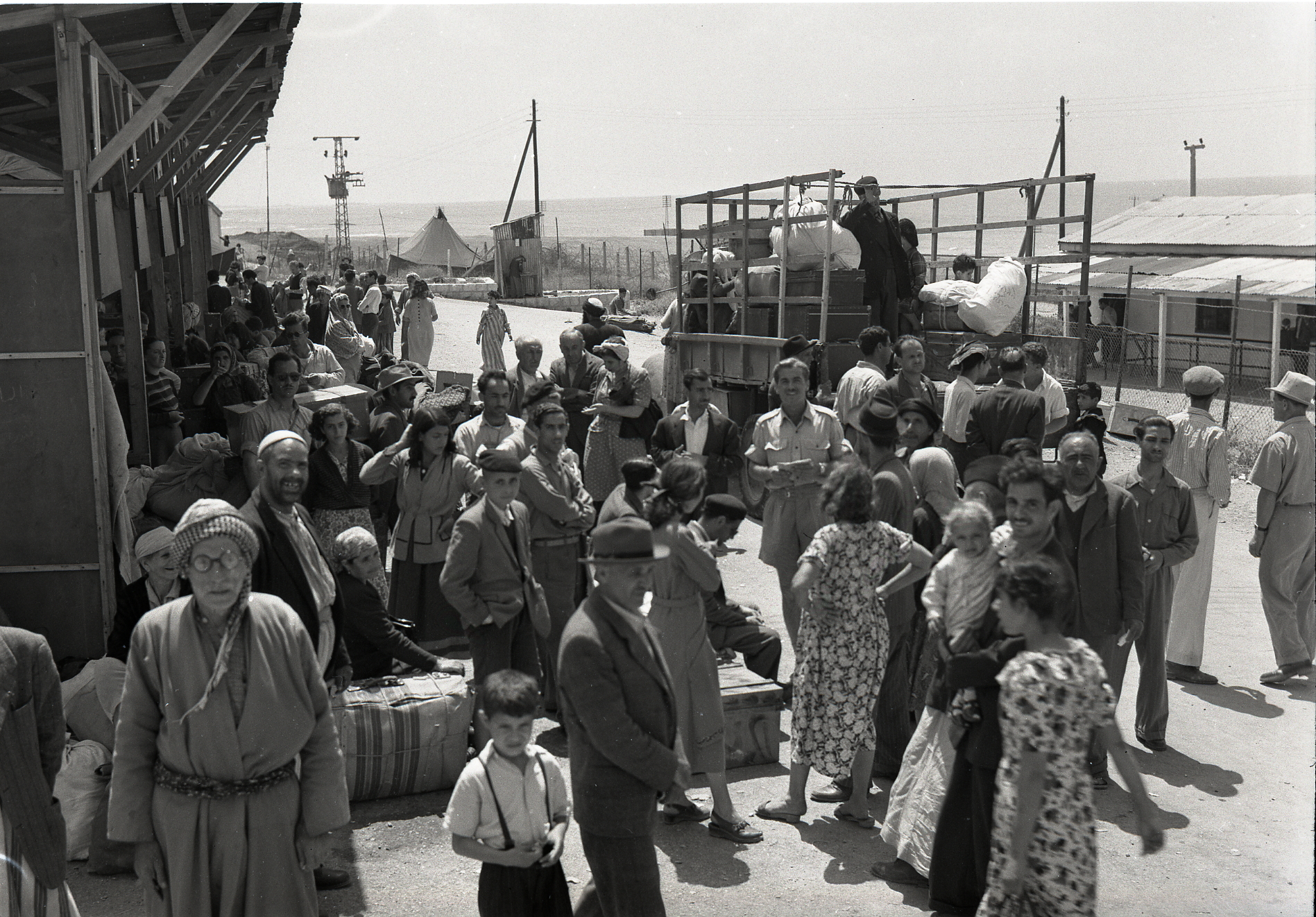
Iraqi immigrants in a ma'abara, April 1951.

Between the abolition of martial law at the end of 1949 and March 1950, thousands of Jews were clandestinely transported across the border to Iran, many individuals secured the assistance of an Arab smuggler, while a few were transported with the aid of the Zionist underground movement. In March 1950, a government law was enacted allowing Jews who wished to leave the State to do so upon renouncing their citizenship. Consequently, a significant number registered, resulting in approximately 110,000 Jews legally emigrating to Israel between June 1950 and June 1951. At first it was called "Operation Ali Baba," however it became known by Operation Ezra and Nehemiah, for the prophets who led Babylonian Jews out of exile to the Land of Israel. Within days of the first operation, over 30,000 Iraqi Jews registered to leave which meant they had to leave within 15 days. The ones who weren't able to leave within 15 days were considered stateless refugees, and many lived homeless in the streets of Baghdad. In response, the Iraqi government announced that it was prepared to move them to concentration camps if they were not removed swiftly. Additionally, around 13,000 Iraqi Jews emigrated to Israel through illegal means. In 1951, the Iraqi government enacted a freeze on the properties of individuals who had departed or were preparing to depart from the country.

Between (1950 to 1952) around 120,000 and 130,000 Jews were airlifted out of Iraq to Israel. Once the operation was over, only 6,000 Jews remained in Iraq.

== Life in Israel ==
=== Arrival in Israel ===
==== The Ma'abarot ====
Between 1950 and 1951, around 123,000 Iraqi Jews arrived in Israel. Many were placed in transit camps, also known as Ma'abarot, that were meant to temporarily host the new immigrants to Israel. Nevertheless, many immigrants remained in the camps for prolonged periods of time, some up to seven years. As they had been de-nationalised and prevented from accessing any assets or properties they owned in Iraq, many Iraqi Jews arrived in Israel in a significantly more precarious economic condition than what they experienced in their country of origin, and were not able to access basic needs.

The Ma'abarot were particularly dangerous for children and newborn, as the lack of sanitation and remoteness of healthcare facilities endangered their health and increased child and infant mortality rates as compared to their lives in Iraq. The polio epidemic, which touched Israel in the 1950s, led to rates of infection as high as 30 to 40 percent in Iraqi Jewish children and infants living in transit camps. Food scarcity and high prices for basic foodstuff led to high rates of malnutrition and hunger amongst the Iraqi Jewish children and infants of the camps, with some families resorting to finding their food in garbage bins. The risk of fire in camp tents and the lack of access to fire departments and fire safety equipment meant that many children were injured or killed as a result from fire accidents. In particular, the death of three siblings, Najah, Eliyahu, and Najd Shemesh, who were burned alive in their tent in the David transit camp, provoked widespread public outrage, including a demonstration of 6,000 Iraqi Jews in front of the Jewish Agency of Haifa.

As such, the Ma'abarot were also sites of Iraqi Jewish political activity. Many Iraqi Jews, including women, protested the poor conditions in which the Israeli government left them. They organised (hunger) strikes, demonstrations, sit-ins, and squats to protest the poor treatment and demand change. Many of the organisers had been previously involved in the Iraqi Communist Party, and used their prior experience of political activism to engender change within the transit camps. Most protests demanded access to basic life necessities in the camps, of which the Iraqi Jews lacked. They asked for better access to the Israeli labour market through the Histadrut's employment offices in nearby cities, for better living conditions, and access to basic facilities such as telephone lines. The rights of children were of particular importance to families and women who joined the protests. Many asked the Israeli government for better access to education and schooling for their children, and protested in response to the high numbers of child casualties in tent fires.

==== Emergence of Mizrahi Jewish identity ====
Alongside Iraqi Jews, Jews from Middle Eastern countries arrived in Israel in the 1950s, leading to major demographic shifts within the country. This change resulted in the emergence of a Mizrahi Jewish identity, which encompassed all Jews who had emigrated to Israel from countries of the Middle East and North Africa.

This transition is viewed positively by the mainstream pro-Israel perspective. The assimilation of the Iraqi Jews within a new identity aimed to integrate them within a new national collective. This allowed for a unified national narrative and integration of the new emigrants into Israeli society. Nevertheless, a minority of left-leaning Iraqi Jews have regarded this shift as a loss of what they perceive as an Arab-Jewish identity that Iraqi Jews had developed following Arabization. However, the overwhelming majority have historically neither identified as Arabs nor been recognized as such by their host communities.

The treatment of Mizrahi Jews and the discrimination they have faced within the predominantly Ashkenazi Jewish Israeli culture has been the subject of heavy criticism. In the first decades after the arrival of the Iraqi Jews, Israeli society was heavily stratified, with the Mizrahi being strongly differentiated from the Ashkenazim in both ethno-cultural and socio-economic terms. Key Israeli institution, which were largely operated by the Ashkenazim, viewed the Mizrahim in a negative light, and often held discriminatory stereotypes, such as thinking the Mizrahim were uneducated, which impacted their treatment of the newly arrived.

Socio-economically, Iraqi Jews were often relegated to the Moshav, agricultural development towns in the Israeli periphery aimed at furthering the country's economic development. There, they worked in low-paying agricultural jobs and were on average significantly poorer than their Ashkenazi counterparts. Ethno-culturally, Mizrahi culture was viewed as more primitive and inferior to that of Ashkenazi culture. Arabic, which was the mother tongue of most Iraqi Jews, was seen within Israel as the language of the enemy due to the Arab–Israeli conflict. While the Arabic language and culture was kept through art and literature as well as private family life, integration into the wider Israeli society demanded the Mizrahi Jews use Hebrew, the national language.

=== Politics ===
==== Party politics in early Israel (1950–1970) ====
In the years following their arrival, many Iraqi Jews took a proactive stance in Israeli politics. Many joined established parties. Mapai, the Workers' Party of Israel, held a special section for Iraqi Jews. Others joined Maki (political party), the Israeli Communist Party, the only non-Zionist party of the country, in accordance to their political actions in Iraq, where many were members of the ICP. Within Maki, Iraqi Jewish partisans heavily criticised the state of Israel for its treatment of the Iraqi Jews and accused it of creating the conditions for their expulsion from Iraq. In accordance to the non-Zionist beliefs of the party, they rejected Israeli ethno-nationalism, as well as Iraqi anti-semitism and fascism. Aiming for further representation in the core institutions of the State of Israel, Iraqi Jews established the Association of Aram Naharayim. They hoped to fight the discrimination faced by Iraqi Jews within Israel, and promote Iraqi Jews to positions of influence, including local municipalities, the Israeli Parliament (the Knesset), and agencies such as the Histadrut.

==== Right-wing rurn (1977) ====
The election of the right-wing Likud Party in Israel in 1977, for the first time winning over the Labour party, was in part attributed to the voting behaviour of the Mizrahim, including Iraqi Jews. Before the 1977, Mizrahi Jews had voted in majority for the Israeli Labour Party and other affiliated left-leaning parties. In part, the Mirzahi bloc's vote for the right-wing parties can be attributed to frustration with the state of Israel's treatment of the Mizrahim, the Labour Party being seen as an extension of the state. As such, it is sometimes referred to as a 'protest vote'. In other parts, the vote represented a wider disillusionment with the Zionist ideals of the Labour Party in the aftermath of the Yom Kippur War. This voting behaviour was a shock to the Labour movement, which had dominated Israeli politics since the creation of the state.

The 1970s showed the emergence of a Mizrahi middle class, which included second-generation Iraqi Jewish immigrants who were born and raised in Israel. This new class had achieved a higher economic and social status, and further assimilation into Israeli society.

=== Literature ===
The emigration of Iraqi Jews to Israel included several prominent literary figures, such as Shimon Ballas, Samir Naqqash, and Sami Michael. Many of these authors wrote extensively about their experiences as Iraqi Jews migrating to Israel and explored themes of dual identity, alienation, nostalgia, and loss, their writings often being semi-autobiographical. The Club of Friends of Arabic Literature in Israel became a place where several of these prominent authors formed a community. There, they debated on whether Iraqi Jewish literature should continue to be written in their Arabic mother tongue, or instead if they should attempt to reach a wider Israeli public through using Hebrew as their primary literary language. Some authors, such as Shimon Ballas, chose to switch to Hebrew, the language of their new nation, while others, such as Samir Naqqash remained committed to Arabic as their language of literary expression. Many of these Iraqi Jewish authors also shared left-leaning political beliefs, had previous ties to the Iraqi Communist Party, and joined Maki (political party), the Israeli communist party, upon emigrating.

The question of identity after emigration to Israel is at the core of Iraqi Jewish literature. For instance, the novel Tel Aviv Mizrah by Shimon Ballas, explores the life of the semi-autobiographical protagonist Yousef Shabi and his emigration from Iraq to Israel. In the novel, Yousef expresses deep nostalgia for life in Baghdad, and recounts the difficulty in reshaping one's identity after arriving in Israel. The dual identity as both an Iraqi and Israeli is thus at the core of the protagonist's journey. Similarly, Samir Naqqash's literary work, such as the collection of short stories The Day the World Became Pregnant and Miscarried, expresses a deep nostalgia for the lost life in Iraq, and explores the feeling of alienation upon entering the country of Israel. In addition, Naqqash's work explores the theme of childhood, which is connected to the nostalgic past in Iraq, as well as the theme of loss of faith, which comes with the uprooting from Iraq and exodus to Israel.

Iraqi Jewish literature also often challenges the narrative of the State of Israel as a place of safety and prosperity for Jews, highlighting the disparities and inconsistencies in the ways Iraqi Jews were treated upon arrival. In her autobiographical novel The Rooster Thief, Iraqi Jewish author Ge'ula Sehayek al-'Ani explores the disillusionment with the state of Israel of Iraqi Jews within the Ma'abarot. The novel explores the life of Amalia, an Iraqi Jewish young girl who emigrates from Iraq to Israel. Upon arrival to the transit camp of Hartuv, Amalia is faced with the reality of poverty and destitution, and questions the adults' narratives about the state of Israel. As such, the novel explores the realities of Iraqi Jewish's children's experiences in transit camps, and questions the mainstream Ashkenazi narrative.

== Notable people ==
=== First generation Iraqi Jewish immigrants ===
==== Avi Shlaim ====
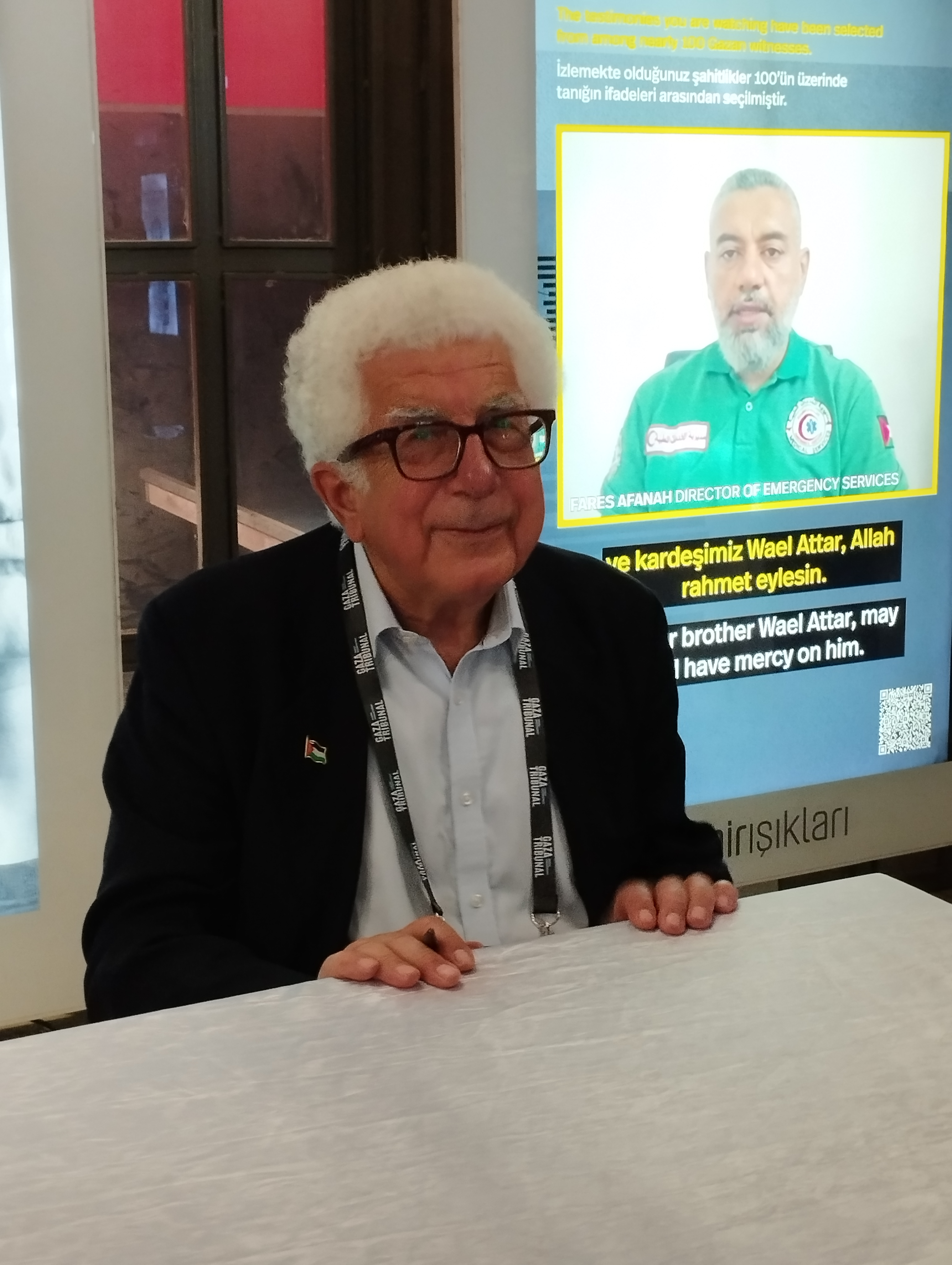
Prof. Avi Shlaim

Avi Shlaim was born in 1945 in Baghdad within a wealthy Iraqi Jewish family, and migrated to Israel alongside his family in 1951. He later became a scholar of the Arab-Israeli conflict and his seminal academic work contributed to the understanding of the Iraqi Jewish identity in Israel. He is considered to be a part of the Israeli New Historians, who used declassified sources in the 1980s to re-assess the creation of Israel. In his memoir Three Worlds: Memoir of an Arab Jew, Shlaim recounts his experience as an Arab Jew, born in Baghdad, uprooted to Israel, and later moving to the UK to study.

==== Samir Naqqash ====
Samir Naqqash was a prominent Iraqi Jewish author. He was born in 1938 in Baghdad and emigrated to Israel in 1951. He was the youngest of a prominent group of Iraqi Jewish authors who migrated from Iraq to Israel. Unlike his compatriots, he continued to write almost exclusively in Arabic while living in Israel, rather than adopting Hebrew as a literary language.

==== Shimon Ballas ====
Shimon Ballas was born in March 1930 in Baghdad, where he lived within the Christian quarters, and emigrated to Israel in 1951. He became a novelist, and wrote about his experience as an Iraqi Jew. In his youth, he studied within the Alliance Israélite Universelle and developed a passion for writing.

==== See also ====
- Arieh Elias
- Binyamin Ben-Eliezer
- Eli Amir
- Ovadia Yosef
- Sami Michael
- Shlomo Eliahu
- Shmuel Moreh
- Sasson Gabai
- Sasson Somekh
- Shlomo Hillel
- Shoshana Arbeli-Almozlino
- Yitzhak Kaduri

=== Second generation Iraqi Jewish immigrants ===
- Reuven Snir
- Itamar Ben-Gvir
- Anat Berko
- Inbal Gavrieli
- Brian George
- May Golan
- Samuel Hayek
- Dalia Itzik
- Moshe Levi
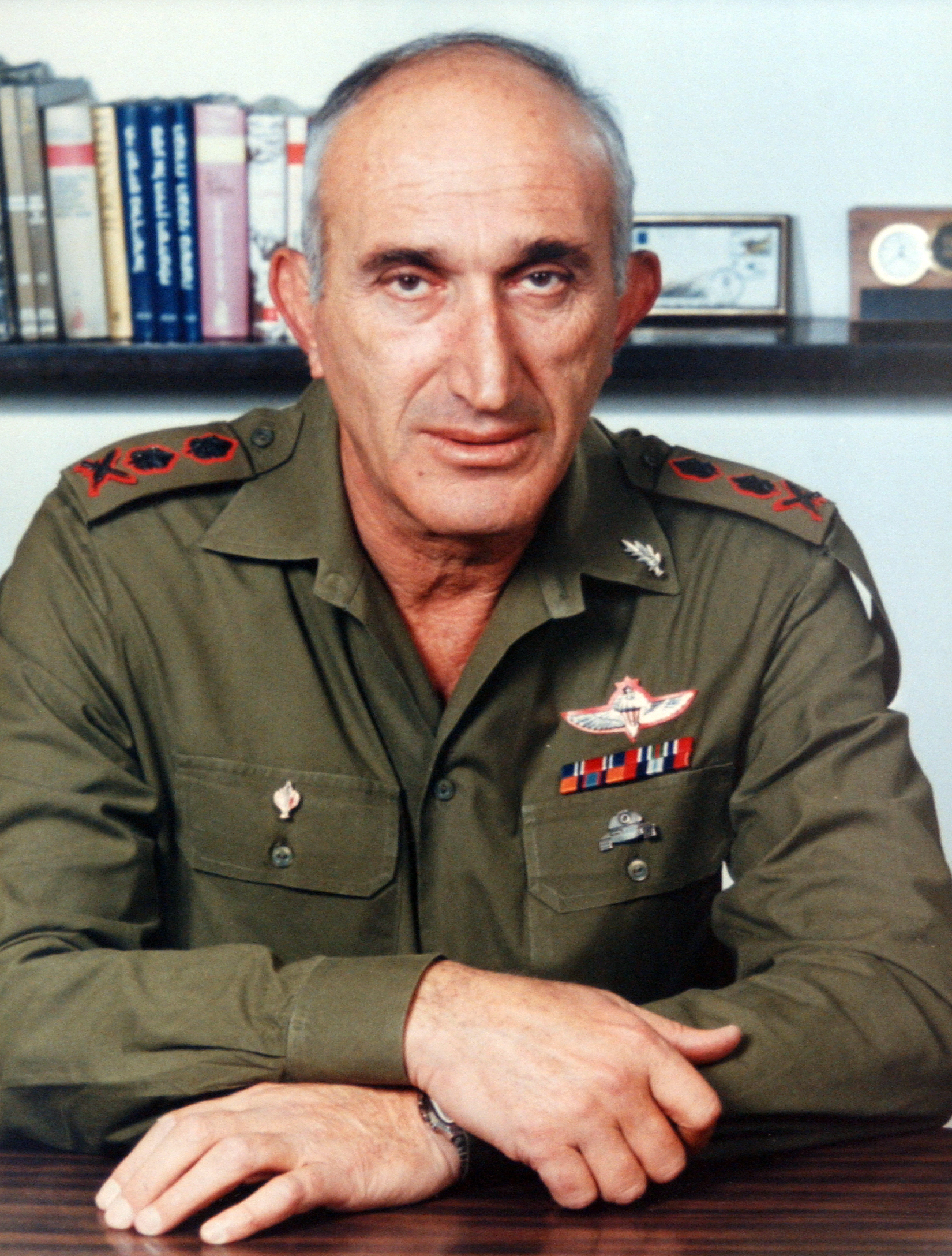
  Moshe Levi, IDF Chief of Staff
- Ayelet Shaked
- Eli Yatzpan
- Zvi Yehezkeli

== See also ==
- Jewish ethnic divisions
- Indian Jews in Israel
- History of the Jews in Iraq
- Iranian Jews in Israel
- Kurdish Jews in Israel
- Iraq–Israel relations

Languages:

- Baghdad Jewish Arabic
- Barzani Jewish Neo-Aramaic
- Judeo-Iraqi Arabic
