= Erdal Merdan =

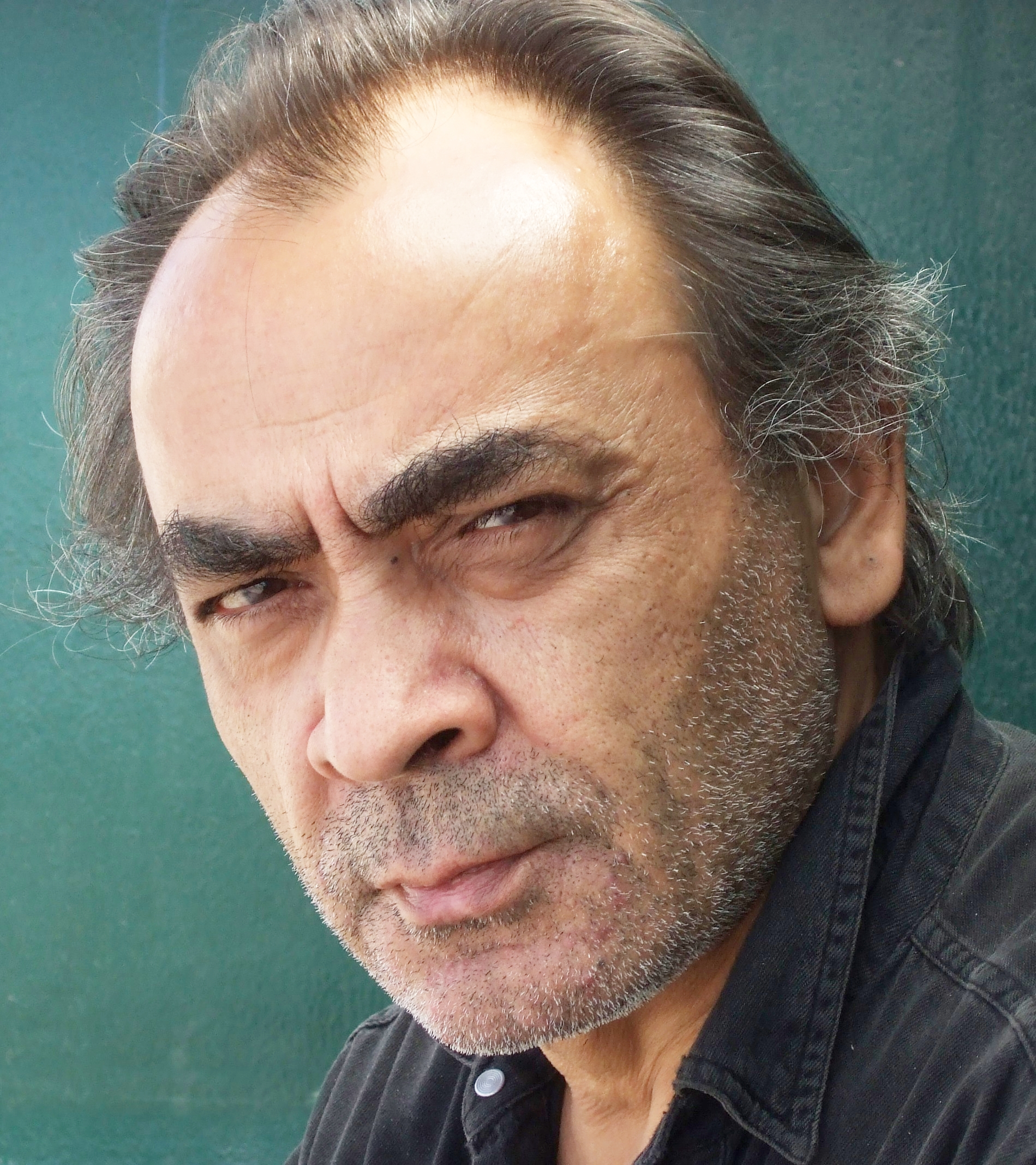
Erdal Merdan

Erdal Merdan (April 8, 1949 – March 24, 2010) was a German dramatist, actor and stage director of Turkish origin.

Born in Kayseri he lived and worked in Germany since 1969. In the Academy Award for Best Foreign Language Film-winning movie Journey of Hope (1990) he also had an international appearance as a movie actor.

== Works ==
=== Theater ===
- Aladdin and the tired lamp (1986), children's play along with Gretel Merdan
- Leyla, Leyla (1986), piece for youth and adults along with Gretel Merdan
- Ayschegül and black ass (1991), children's play

=== Radio play ===
- The Feast of Sacrifice (1982), radio play
- Friends (1983), along with radio play Gretel Scherzinger

=== Book contribution ===
- Birgit Kirchhöfer (ed.): Children's Theatre Workshop in 1991, with scenic texts and discussion contributions from Lilly Axster, Silvio Huonder, Katrin Lange, Erdal Merdan, Henning Fangauf, Wolfgang Schneider, Manuel Schöbel; Literary Colloquium Berlin 1992

== Filmography (selection) ==
- 1975: Tatort: Death in the subway tunnel (TV), directed by Wolf Gremm
- 1978: The Rose and the Nightingale (TV), directed by Frank Guthke
- 1979: Alamanya, Alamanya – Germania, Germania (documentary), directed by Hans A. Guttner
- 1983: In the middle of nowhere (documentary), directed by Hans A. Guttner
- 1984: Fire for the Big Dragon (TV), directed by Eberhard Itzenplitz
- 1990: Journey of Hope, directed by Xavier Koller
- 1991: Tatort: The Chinese Method (TV), directed by Maria Knilli
- 1994: Polizeiruf 110: Ghosts (TV), directed by Klaus Emmerich
- 1995: On foot and without money (TV miniseries), directed by Werner Masten
- 1998: The pirate, directed by Bernd Schadewald
- 1998: The key (short film), directed by Su Turhan
- 2003: A number / Karen (experimental film), directed by Stefan Mehlhorn
- 2005: Photosynthesis (Short Film), directed by Jens Leske
- 2006: Cypress, directed by Johannes Bauer, Monika Lödl among others
- 2006: Kopfsache (short film), directed by Doron Wisotzky
- 2009: Charity (short film), directed by Stephanie Olthoff

== Awards ==
- Shot in the English edition of personal encyclopaedia Who's Who 1978
- Grant from the Literary Colloquium Berlin 1991
- AZ -star 1997 as an ensemble member for transit home / Set tables – a trip with Gorky's Summer Guests (Fish & plastic)
- tz -Rose as an ensemble member for transit home / Set tables – a trip with Gorky's Summer Guests (Fish & plastic)

== Literature ==
- Otto J. Groeg: Who's who in the Arts: A Biographical Encyclopedia Containing Some 13,000 Biographies and Addresses of Prominent Personalities, Organizations, Associations and Institutions Connected with the Arts in the Federal Republic of Germany, Who's Who Book & Publ., 1978
