= Forget Baghdad: Jews and Arabs – The Iraqi Connection =

2002 Swiss-German documentary film

- Directed by: Samir
- Written by: Samir
- Screenplay by: Samir
- Produced by: Samir; Gerd Haag; Karin Koch
- Cinematography: Nurit Aviv; Philippe Bellaiche
- Edited by: Samir; Nina Schneider
- Music by: Rabih Abou-Khalil
- Production companies: Dschoint Ventschr Filmproduktion AG, TagTraum Cologne
- Distributed by: Arab Film Distribution
- Release dates: November 21, 2002 (Switzerland); March 13, 2003 (Germany)
- Running time: 111
- Countries: Germany; Switzerland
- Languages: English; Arabic; Hebrew

Forget Baghdad: Jews and Arabs – The Iraqi Connection is a 2002 documentary film about Mizrahim, members of the former Jewish community of Iraq. It was written and directed by Samir, a Swiss-Iraqi filmmaker born in Baghdad in 1955 who has been living in Switzerland since 1961.

The film focuses on five expatriate Iraqi Jews, most living in Israel: Shimon Ballas, Moshe (Moussa) Houri, Sami Michael, Samir Naqqash, and Ella Habiba Shohat.

The film's music is by Lebanese jazz musician Rabih Abou-Khalil. It was produced by Karin Koch, Gerd Haag, and Samir and edited by Nina Schneider and Samir. The directors of photography were Nurith Aviv and Philippe Bellaiche.

The film was a coproduction between TagTraum Cologne, SF DRS, Teleclub, and Dschoint Ventschr Filmproduktion. It is 112 minutes in length.

The DVD, which is distributed by Arab Film Distribution, comes with a 30-minute "Making of the film" featurette. The DVD has multiple audio tracks and subtitles in English, German, French, Arabic, Hebrew, Italian, and Spanish.

== Reception ==
- A fascinating but disorganized documentary.
  – Stephen Holden, The New York Times, December 4, 2003
- Grainy video and gimmicky editing give this documentary an amateurish feel, but Samir's charming, rueful interlocutors shine through.
  – Anya Kamenetz, Village Voice, December 2, 2003
- Samir's presentation is uninspired and too long. It's outdated, too.
  – V.A. Musetto, New York Post, December 5, 2003
- Explores identity, but words get in the way.
  – Michael O'Sullivan, The Washington Post, April 16, 2004
- Timely and thought-provoking, if a bit rambling.
  – Deborah Young, Variety, December 23, 2003

== See also ==
- History of the Jews in Iraq
