= Rotpunktverlag =

- Founded: 1976
- Successor: Rotpunkt Verlag (RPV)
- Country of origin: Switzerland
- Headquarters location: Zürich
- Nonfiction topics: political history, novels, sustainable tourism
- No. of employees: 7
- Official website: www.rotpunktverlag.ch

Rotpunktverlag is a Swiss publishing house, headquartered at Hohlstrasse 86A, 8004 Zürich, Switzerland. Founded in 1976 in Zürich, it is specialized in political history.

== History and publishing fields ==
The publishing house was founded in 1976 as the cooperative Rotpunkt Verlag (RPV) by the Swiss political party POCH (Swiss Progressive Organisations) to promote the publication and dissemination of socialist literature. Rotpunktverlag literally means Red Dot Publications. In the field of fiction, Rotpunktverlag publishes novels and short stories from Switzerland, including many first works, as well as political non-fiction. Contemporary literature by authors from Latin America and the Caribbean is also distributed. Hiking have become a further hallmark of Rotpunktverlag's distributions, usually present region-related hiking and promotion of a smooth, sustainable tourism.

== Organisation ==
For the purpose of long-term financial security, in 1997 the conversion into a corporation (Aktiengesellschaft) was decided: about 550 shareholders have been subscribed share capital for approximately 1,500,000 Swiss Francs. In May 2012, an authorized capital increase has been applied for, to which alongside the existing shareholders, other people may participate (legal and natural personalities), in all an additional a share capital in the amount of CHF 656,000, with the proviso that former shareholders may exercise pre-emptive rights of one share for two existing one. This predominantly may pre-finance the growing program and save the long-term liquidity.

Rotpunktverlag is a member of SWIPS, the platform of independent Swiss publishers.

== Works ==
Remarkable works include Grüningers Fall by Stefan Keller that was published in 1993, on which also partially bases the Swiss-Austrian film Akte Grüninger of 2013, honoring Paul Grüninger. In 1995 Peter Kamber's Schüsse auf die Befreier – Die Luftguerilla der Schweiz gegen die Alliierten 1943–45 documented among others the abuses at the Wauwilermoos penal camp between 1941 and 1945. In 1998 Rotpunktverlag was awarded by the Swiss book trade association as publisher of the year 2011.

== See also ==
- POCH
- WOZ Die Wochenzeitung
