= Lang Film =

- Founded: 1980
- Founder: Bernard Lang
- Headquarters: Freienstein, Switzerland
- Key people: Anne-Catherine Lang; Olivier Zobrist
- Products: Film, TV
- Website: www.langfilm.ch

Lang Film is a film and TV production company based in Freienstein, Switzerland. The company produces documentary films, feature films and TV films. Lang Film is one of the most well-known Swiss film production companies. The company also includes Langfilm Distribution and the cinema neues KINO in Freienstein.

== History ==
The company was founded in 1980 by Bernhard Lang, and has since produced a high number of films for cinema and TV, both fiction, documentary and animation. It is run by producers Anne-Catherine Lang and Olivier Zobrist, as well as junior producer Julia Schubiger.

Langfilm is responsible for the production of Swiss film classics such as Höhenfeuer by Fredi M. Murer and The Mountain by Markus Imhoof. In recent years, they produced sereral films that were successfully placed at festivals, like the films by Swiss theater director Milo Rau that were shown at Locarno and Venice Film Festival, the first feature Longing for the world (L'amour du monde) by actress and director Jenna Hasse that was awarded a special mention in the Generation section at Berlinale, or the short On Solid Ground (Über Wasser) which premiered at Critics' Week of the Cannes Film Festival.

Their productions have received numerous awards, several of their films were awarded with the Swiss Film Award.

== Filmography ==
A selection

- 1985: Höhenfeuer by Fredi M. Murer
- 1990: The Mountain by Markus Imhoof
- 1992: Benny's Video by Michael Haneke
- 2007: The Friend by Micha Lewinsky
- 2009: Will you marry us? by Micha Lewinsky
- 2014: Electroboy by Marcel Gisler
- 2017: The Congo Tribunal (Das Kongo-Tribunal) by Milo Rau
- 2018: Monogamisch (Seitentriebe), TV Series, by Güzin Kar
- 2019: Average Happiness by Maja Gehrig
- 2020: The New Gospel (Das neue Evangelium) by Milo Rau
- 2020: One-way to Moscow! (Moskau Einfach!) by Micha Lewinsky
- 2023: Longing for the world (L'amour du monde) by Jenna Hasse
- 2024: Brunaupark by Felix Hergert and Dominik Zietlow
