= Feride Çiçekoğlu =

Turkish writer (born 1951)

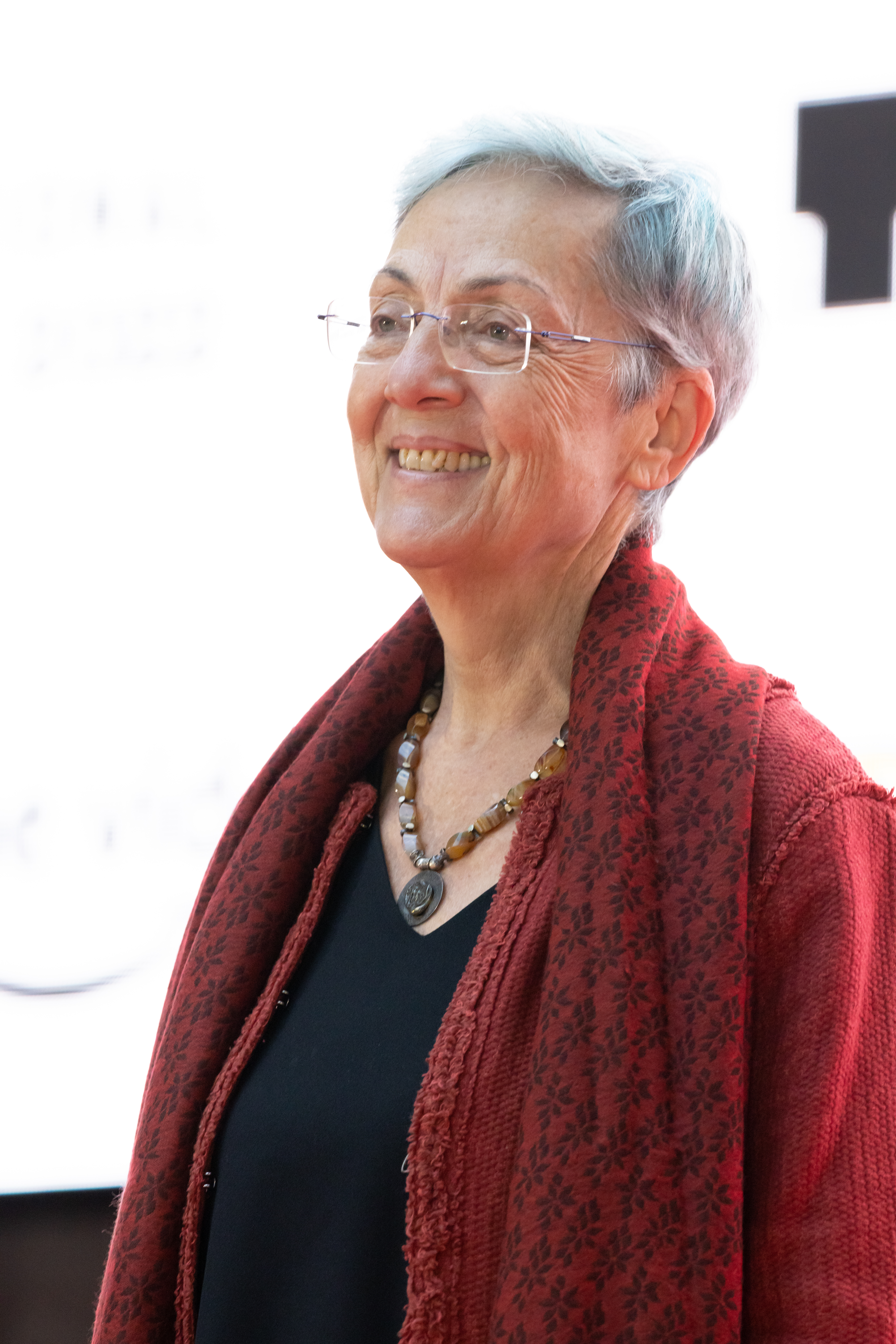
- Born: 27 January 1951 (age 75); Ankara, Turkey
- Education: Middle East Technical University; University of Pennsylvania
- Occupation: Writer
- Employer: Istanbul Bilgi University

Feride Çiçekoğlu (born 27 January 1951) is a Turkish writer and screenwriter. Following the 1980 Turkish coup d'état, she was detained for four years due to her political activism. Following her release, she published a book, Don't Let Them Shoot the Kite, based on her experiences in prison, which was subsequently adapted into the 1989 film of the same name.

Çiçekoğlu has since gone on to become a noted writer, translator and academic. With Xavier Koller, she co-wrote the screenplay of the 1990 film Journey of Hope, which went on to win the Academy Award for Best Foreign Language Film. Since 1999, Çiçekoğlu has been a professor at Istanbul Bilgi University, where her research focuses on the relationship between the city, women and cinema.

== Early life and education ==
Çiçekoğlu was born on 27 January 1951 in Ankara, Turkey, to Hasan Kemal Çiçekoğlu, a retired Supreme Court judge, and Nihal Hanım (née Şuşud). After graduating from a Maarif college in 1968, she started studying architecture at Middle East Technical University. After receiving her bachelor's degree in 1973, Çiçekoğlu went on to obtain a master's degree in environmental psychology the following year. She received a Fulbright scholarship to pursue her doctorate at the University of Pennsylvania in the United States. During her time in Philadelphia, Çiçekoğlu was introduced to leftist politics; her doctorate, received in 1976, was a critique of the city's planning process.

== Activism and imprisonment ==
By 1977, Çiçekoğlu had returned to Turkey, where she worked as an assistant at Ankara State Engineering and Architecture Academy (today, part of the engineering and architecture faculty at Gazi University), where she worked in 1979. On 12 September 1980, a military coup d'état occurred in Turkey, following which Çiçekoğlu was detained on charges of making communist propaganda. After being tortured for 55 days, she was imprisoned for four years, spending two years at Mamak Military Prison and two years at Ankara Central Prison in Ulucanlar.

== Writing career ==
After Çiçekoğlu's release from prison in 1984, she began working as an editor at Kalem Yayınları, a publishing house, where she remained until 1987. During her time there, she oversaw translations into Turkish of A History of Pornography by H. Montgomery Hyde and Jonathan Livingston Seagull by Richard Bach. Çiçekoğlu also began publishing her own work; her short story The Last Passenger received the 1987 Haldun Taner Short Story Award.

In 1985, a collection of Çiçekoğlu's short stories were released under the title Jazz, the Music of Sorrow. That same year, she published a novel, Don't Let Them Shoot the Kite, based on her relationship with a young child living at the prison she had been detained in. The novel was adapted into the 1989 film of the same name, which received positive reviews in Turkey.

During the late 1980s, Çiçekoğlu focused on writing screenplays. In 1988, she wrote The Other Side of Water, about the experience of Turkish and Greek people during and after the 1923 population exchange on Cunda Island; the screenplay won the Abdi İpekçi Peace and Friendship Award. That same year, Çiçekoğlu won the Yunus Nadi Award for her screenplay Where Spring Ends, which aired as a television series on TRT 1 in 1989.

In 1989, Çiçekoğlu co-wrote with Xavier Koller the screenplay Journey of Hope, about an Alevi family from Kahramanmaraş attempting to illegally migrate to Switzerland. The film, which was a joint production between the United Kingdom, Switzerland and Turkey, won the Academy Award for Best Foreign Language Film.

Between 1991 and 1995, Çiçekoğlu served as the secretary general of the Turkish Cinema Foundation. She was the editor of the History Foundation's Istanbul magazine from 1995 until 1999.

In 1992, Çiçekoğlu won the Lebon Cultural Centre Literature Award for her short-story collection Has Your Father Ever Died?.

== Books ==
- İsyankar Şehir: Gezi Sonrası İstanbul Filmlerinde Mahrem İsyan (2019)
- Şehrin İtirazı (2015)
- Vesikalı Şehir (2007)
- Uçurtmayı Vurmasınlar (1990)
- Suyun Öte Yanı (1992)
- Sizin Hiç Babanız Öldü mü? (1994)
- 100'lük Ülkeden Mektuplar (1996)
- Vesikalı Şehir (2007)
- Milföy ve Arkadaşları (2024)

== Films-Scenario ==
- 1989 - Baharın Bittiği Yer
- 1989 - Uçurtmayı Vurmasınlar
- 1990 - Umuda Yolculuk
- 1991 - Suyun Öte Yanı
- 1996 - Altın Kent İstanbul
- 2000 - Melekler Evi
- 2007 - Parmaklıklar Ardında
- 2009 - Altın Kızlar

== Films-Director ==
- 1989 Uçurtmayı Vurmasınlar

== Awards ==
- 1986 -Haldun Taner Öykü Armağanı Third Award
- 1988 - Abdi İpekçi Friendship and Peace Award
- 1989 - 26. Antalya Altın Portakal Movie Festival, Best Scenario, Uçurtmayı Vurmasınlar
- 1992- Lebon Cinema Clup Literature Award
- 2006 - Bilge Olgaç Success Award

== Academic career ==
In 1998, Çiçekoğlu returned to academia when she started working in the visual communication and design department of Maltepe University. The following year, she transferred to Bilgi University, where she continues to work as a cinema and television lecturer. Her research has included the relationship between women and cinema in Vesikalı Şehir (2007); and a history of films produced both before and after the 2013 Gezi Park protests, in Şehir Objection (2015) and Rebellious City (2019), respectively.

At the ninth Flying Broom International Women's Film Festival, Çiçekoğlu won the Bilge Olgaç Achievement Award in recognition of her contributions to Turkish cinema.
