= Paul Grüninger =

Swiss police commander (1891–1972)

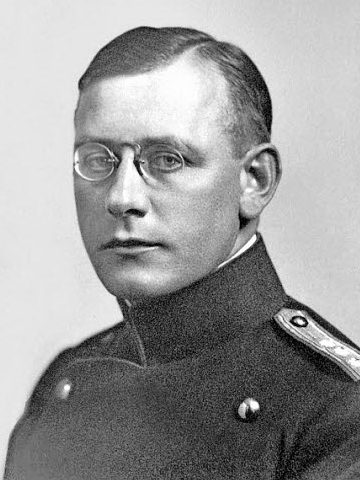
- Grüninger, c. 1939

Police Commander of St. Gallen
- In office 1 January 1925 – 12 May 1939

Personal details
- Born: Paul Grüninger; 27 October 1891 St. Gallen, St. Gallen, Switzerland
- Died: 22 February 1972 (aged 80) St. Gallen, St. Gallen, Switzerland
- Spouse: Alice Federer (m. 1920)
- Children: 1
- Occupation: Police commander, teacher and football player
- Awards: Righteous Among the Nations by Yad Vashem

Paul Grüninger (German pronunciation: [paʊ̯l ˈɡʁyːnɪŋɐ]; 27 October 1891 – 22 February 1972) was a Swiss police commander in St. Gallen. He was recognized as one of the Righteous Among the Nations by the Yad Vashem Holocaust memorial foundation in 1971. Following the Austrian Anschluss, Grüninger saved about 3,600 Jewish refugees by backdating their visas and falsifying other documents to indicate that they had entered Switzerland at a time when legal entry of refugees was still possible. He was dismissed from the police force, convicted of official misconduct, and fined 300 Swiss francs. He received no pension and died in poverty in 1972.

== Early life ==
Grüninger attended a teacher preparatory school from 1907 to 1911. He also played football semi-professionally. In 1913 he joined SC Brühl and was part of the squad that won the 1915 Swiss first division title. Following completion of military service, in 1919 he joined the police corps of the canton of St. Gallen.

== Rescue of Jews ==
Grüninger was police commander of the Canton of St. Gallen that borders Germany and Austria. Following the annexation of Austria by Nazi Germany, Switzerland had closed its border to Jewish people arriving without proper entry permits, and in October 1938 negotiations between Switzerland and Germany led to the stamping of a 'J' in passports issued to Jewish people.

As the number of refugees who tried to enter Switzerland illegally increased, Grüninger decided in the summer of 1938 not to send them back, facing the consequence of breaching explicit government instructions. To legalize the refugees' status, he falsified visas so that their passports showed that they had arrived in Switzerland before March 1938, when immigration to Switzerland had been restricted. This enabled newly arrived Jewish refugees to be taken to Diepoldsau camp to await permits for a temporary stay. Grüninger falsified reports about the number of arrivals and status of refugees in his canton. He also used his own funds to provide some of them with winter clothing.

The Swiss federal government initiated an investigation, whereupon Grüninger was dismissed by the government without notice in March 1939. Grüninger's trial at the district court of St. Gallen opened in January 1939 and dragged over two years. In March 1941 the court found him guilty of "breach of duty", "official misconduct and forgery to a fine". His retirement benefits were forfeited, and he was cashiered, fined and had to pay the trial costs. The court recognized his altruistic motivations, but found that nevertheless, as a state employee, it was his duty to follow his instructions.

== Later life ==
Ostracized and forgotten, Grüninger lived for the rest of his life in difficult circumstances. Despite the difficulties, he never regretted his action on behalf of the Jews. In 1954 he explained his motives:

Whoever had the opportunity, like me, to witness those heartbreaking scenes, the victims' collapse, the cries of mothers and children, the suicide threats as well as suicide attempts – that person could no longer comply.

I am not ashamed of the court's verdict. On the contrary, I am proud to have saved the lives of hundreds of oppressed people. My assistance to Jews was rooted in my Christian world outlook… It was basically a question of saving human lives threatened with death. How could I then seriously consider bureaucratic schemes and calculations. Sure, I intentionally exceeded the limits of my authority and often with my own hands falsified documents and certificates, but it was done solely in order to afford persecuted people access into the country. My personal well-being, measured against the cruel fate of these thousands, was so insignificant and unimportant that I never even took it into consideration.

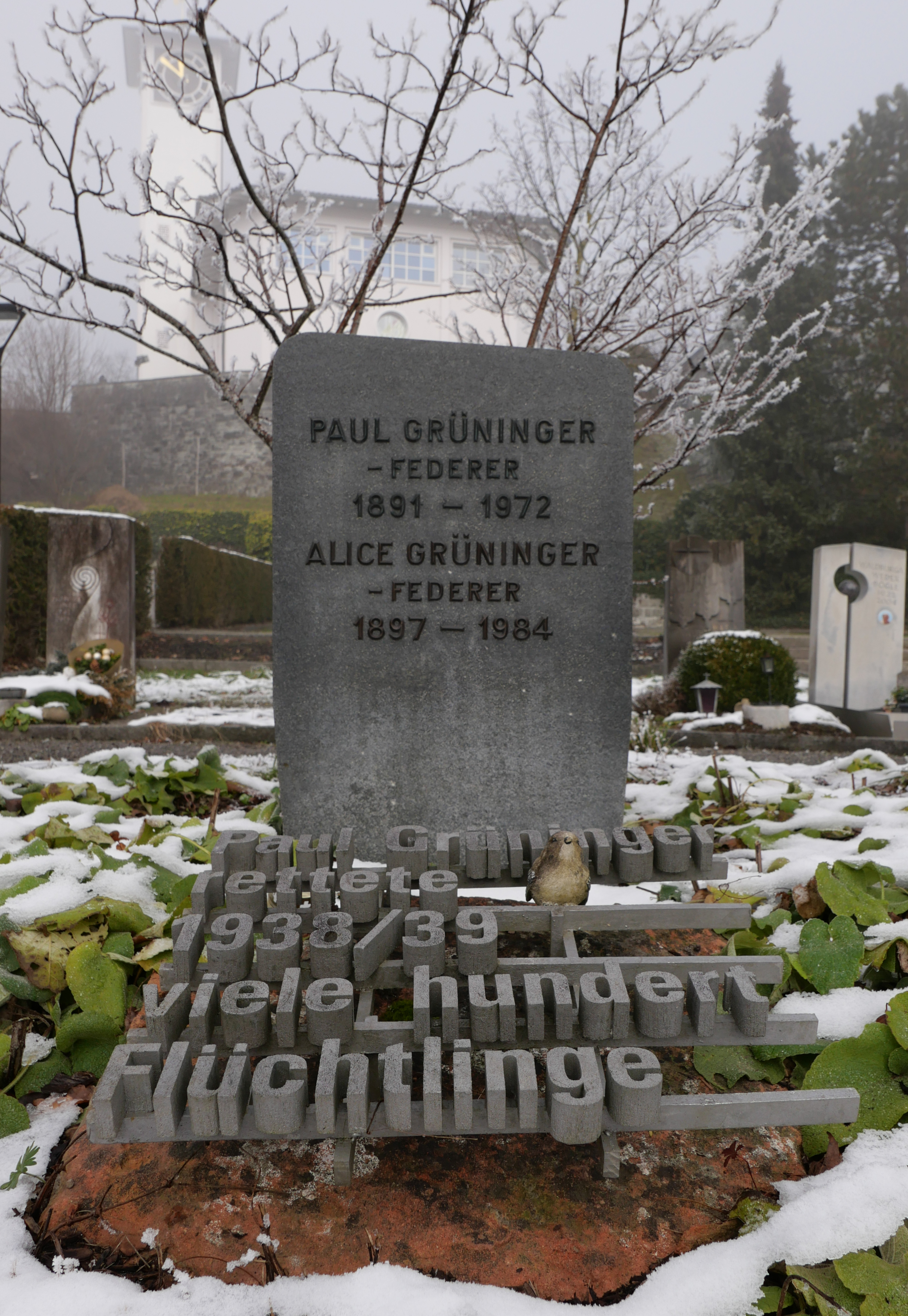
The tomb in 2025.

In December 1970 as a result of protest in the media, the Swiss government sent Grüninger "a somewhat reserved letter of apology, but refrained from reopening his case and reinstating his pension". He was shunned as a corrupt womanizer and a Nazi for the rest of his life, and never again found a permanent job. He died in 1972, nearly forgotten in Switzerland, without rehabilitation by the authorities. Two months before his death, West German President Gustav Heinemann gave him a color television.

The mortal remains of Grüninger were cremated and his urn buried at the cemetery of Au, a small town in the canton of St. Gallen where he resided. His wife Alice, née Federer in 1897, died in 1984 and her urn was buried next to his. The simple tombstone bears only their names and the year numbers of their births and deaths. In 2008, the artist Norbert Möslang, who hails from St. Gallen, created a three-dimensional text sculpture, which reads:

"Paul Grüninger / rettete / 1938/39 / viele hundert / Flüchtlinge" (Paul Grüninger rescued in 1938/39 many hundreds of refugees")

Eight years later, the couple's urns were reburied as part of the cemetery renovation. The grave had previously been located on the left side of the northern rear wall of the cemetery, but was now relocated to the middle on the initiative of the Municipal Council in order to upgrade it to a memorial in a central location. This project was co-funded by the local congregation of the Protestant Reformed Church.

== Rehabilitation and Righteous Among the Nations ==
After his death, Grüninger's fate was brought back partially into the public memory by some publications beginning in 1984, and steps to rehabilitate him were set into motion. The first attempt was rejected by the Swiss Council, and only as late as 1995, the Swiss federal Government finally annulled Grüninger's conviction: the district court of St. Gallen revoked the judgment against him and cleared him of all charges. Three years later the government of the Canton of St. Gallen paid compensation to his descendants, and in 1999 also the so-called Bergier Commission's report took part in Grüninger's rehabilitation, as well to rehabilitate the surviving people who had been convicted during the National Socialist period in Switzerland for their assistance to refugees – 137 women and men received public rehabilitation up to 2009.

In 1971, the Yad Vashem Holocaust memorial foundation in Israel honoured Grüninger as one of the Righteous Among the Nations. Several streets located in Israel (Jerusalem, Petah-Tikwa, Rishon-Le'Tzion) has been named after him.

== Legacy ==
- The stadium of the association football club Brühl St. Gallen is named in his honour.
- The Rhine bridge between Diepoldsau (Switzerland) and Hohenems in Austria, which was one of the locations in the film Akte Grüninger, was in summer 2012 named after Paul Grüninger.
- Paul-Grüninger-Weg in Zürich-Oerlikon

== In literature, film and television ==
- Irma C. Erman: A Dream Drama with Justitia, a 1976 unpublished play in English.
- Grüningers Fall, a 1997 Swiss documentary film based on Stefan Keller's book Grüningers Fall. Geschichten von Flucht und Hilfe.
- Akte Grüninger, a 2013 Swiss-Austrian film
- Stefan Keller: Grüningers Fall. Geschichten von Flucht und Hilfe. Rotpunktverlag, Zürich 1998, ISBN 978-3858691576.
- Wulff Bickenbach: Gerechtigkeit für Paul Grüninger. Verurteilung und Rehabilitierung eines Schweizer Fluchthelfers (1938–1998). Böhlau, Köln 2009, ISBN 978-3-412-20334-4.

== See also ==
- Rescue of Jews during the Holocaust
