= Journey of Hope =

1990 film

- Film poster
- Directed by: Xavier Koller
- Written by: Feride Çiçekoğlu; Xavier Koller
- Produced by: Peter-Christian Fueter; Alfi Sinniger
- Starring: Necmettin Cobanoglu; Nur Sürer; Emin Sivas; Yaman Okay; Mathias Gnädinger; Dietmar Schönherr
- Cinematography: Elemér Ragályi; Galip Iyitanir
- Edited by: Daniel Gibel
- Production company: Beyond Films Premium Films
- Distributed by: Columbus Films
- Release date: August 1990 (Locarno International Film Festival)
- Running time: 110 minutes
- Countries: Switzerland; Turkey
- Languages: Turkish; Swiss German; Italian

Journey of Hope (German: Reise der Hoffnung; Turkish: Umuda yolculuk) is a 1990 film directed by Xavier Koller. It tells the story of an Alevi rural family from Turkey trying to illegally emigrate to Switzerland, a country they know only from a postcard. The film is a co-production between companies in Switzerland, Turkey and the United Kingdom.

The film won the 1990 Academy Award for Best Foreign Language Film.

== Plot ==
In a village in eastern Turkey, tales of the economic success of Turks in Switzerland inspire Haydar to convince his wife Meryem that they must go. He sells their livestock and small plot of land in exchange for passage for two. He wants to leave their seven children in the care of the eldest and his parents; his father advises him to take one son to be educated in Europe, as economic insurance. The three set off for Istanbul, Milan, and Switzerland, stowing away on a ship. At Lake Como, they pay the rest of their money to unprincipled men who abandon them at an Alpine pass before a blizzard. Father and son are separated from Meryem.

== Cast ==
- Necmettin Çobanoglu: Haydar Sener
- Nur Sürer: Meryem
- Emin Sivas: Mehmet Ali
- Yaman Okay: Turkmen
- Erdinc Akbas: Adama
- Mathias Gnädinger: Ramser
- Dietmar Schönherr: Massimo
- Andrea Zogg: Christen
- Erdal Merdan: Aldemir

== See also ==
- List of submissions to the 63rd Academy Awards for Best Foreign Language Film
- List of Swiss submissions for the Academy Award for Best Foreign Language Film
