= Don't Let Them Shoot the Kite =

- Theatrical film poster
- Directed by: Tunç Başaran
- Written by: Tunç Başaran; Feride Çiçekoğlu
- Produced by: Tunç Başaran; Jale Onanç
- Starring: Nur Sürer; Ozan Bilen; Füsun Demirel; Rozet Hubeş; Güzin Özipek; Güzin Özyağcılar; Yasemin Alkaya; Meral Çetinkaya; Hale Akınlı
- Cinematography: Erdal Kahraman
- Music by: Özkan Turgay
- Production company: Magnum Film
- Release date: 1989
- Running time: 100 minutes
- Country: Turkey
- Language: Turkish

Don't Let Them Shoot the Kite (Turkish: Uçurtmayı Vurmasınlar) is a 1989 Turkish drama film, co-written, co-produced and directed by Tunç Başaran based on a 1986 novella by Feride Çiçekoğlu, featuring Nur Sürer as a female political prisoner who befriends the child of a fellow inmate. The film was screened in competition at the 26th Antalya Golden Orange Film Festival, where it won Golden Oranges for Best Film, Best Actress, Best Screenplay and Best Cinematography, the 10th Mediterranean International Film Festival, where it won 2nd Best Film, and the 8th Istanbul International Film Festival, where it won Best Turkish Film. The film was selected as the Turkish entry for the Best Foreign Language Film at the 62nd Academy Awards, but was not accepted as a nominee.

The film is set in 1984 Ankara, during the aftermath of the 1980 Turkish coup. It is currently available to legally stream with English subtitles through the German media website Pantaflix.

== Plot ==
When a woman is sent to prison for drug smuggling, Barış, her young son, is sent with her, as is the custom in Turkey. Inside the all-women’s penitentiary, Barış (Ozan Bilen) forms a relationship with Inci (Nur Sürer), a political prisoner who offers him guidance and companionship.

== Cast ==
- Nur Sürer as İnci
- Ozan Bilen as Barış
- Füsun Demirel as Fatma
- Rozet Hubeş as Zeynep
- Güzin Özipek as Sultanteyze
- Güzin Özyağcılar as Selma
- Yasemin Alkaya as Filiz
- Meral Çetinkaya as Safinaz
- Hale Akınlı as Sümbül

== Production ==
The film is based on a 1986 novella by Feride Çiçekoğlu, who was inspired by the four years she spent as a political prisoner following the 1980 Turkish coup. Director Tunç Başaran's wife, Jale, served as the film's art director. The film was produced on a very limited budget, as was common in Turkey at the time. Başaran remarked, "If I were given $1 million to make a picture, I would use the money to make four films."

Although the film is set in Ankara, many of the prison scenes were filmed in Istanbul's Sultanahmet Jail. Ankara's Ulucanlar Prison has also been identified as one of the filming locations.

== Critical reception ==
In The Routledge Dictionary of Turkish Cinema, Gönül Dönmez-Colin calls Don't Let Them Shoot the Kite "one of the classics of Turkish cinema", and in World Film Locations: Istanbul, Özlem Köksal writes that "[Baris] leaning against the imposing prison wall with hands in his pockets is definitely an iconic image in Turkish cinema."

Kevin Thomas of the Los Angeles Times named Don't Let Them Shoot the Kite as a highlight of the 1990 L.A. Film Festival.

== See also ==
- List of submissions to the 62nd Academy Awards for Best Foreign Language Film
- List of Turkish submissions for the Academy Award for Best Foreign Language Film
