= Iraqi Odyssey =

2014 film

- Film poster
- Directed by: Samir
- Written by: Samir
- Produced by: Werner Swiss Schweizer; Joël Louis Jent; Samir; Herbert Schwering
- Cinematography: Lukas Strebel; Pierre Mennel; Yuri Burak; John Kelleran; Kirill Gerra; Samir
- Edited by: Samir; Sophie Brunner; Ali Al-Fatlawi; Wathiq Al Ameri
- Music by: Maciej Sledziecki
- Release date: September 2014
- Running time: 162 minutes
- Countries: Switzerland, Germany, United Arab Emirates, Iraq
- Languages: Arabic, French, English, German

Iraqi Odyssey (Arabic: الأوديسة العراقية, romanized: al-ʿAwdassi al-ʿIrāqiyya) is a 2014 Swiss documentary film written and directed by Samir. It was selected as the Swiss entry for the Best Foreign Language Film at the 88th Academy Awards, but was not nominated. The film won awards including the Best Asian Film Award at the 2014 Abu Dhabi Film Festival and the 2015 Zurich Film Prize.

== Synopsis ==
The film contrasts contemporary Western media images of Iraq with footage from the 1950s and 1970s, and follows director Samir as he tells the story of his globally dispersed Iraqi middle-class family, whose members are scattered across Auckland, Moscow, Paris, London, and Buffalo.

== Reception ==
=== Awards and nominations ===
The film won awards including the Best Asian Film Award at the 2014 Abu Dhabi Film Festival, the 2015 Zurich Film Prize, and third place in the documentary category at the 2016 Zurich Film Prize. It was also nominated for Best Documentary Film at the 2015 Swiss Film Award.

In August 2015, Iraqi Odyssey was one of seven films shortlisted for consideration as Switzerland’s entry for the Best Foreign Language Film at the 88th Academy Awards. Later that month, it was selected as Switzerland’s official submission. It failed to make the Academy’s nine-film shortlist for the category.

=== Critical response ===
The Hollywood Reporter described Iraqi Odyssey as an ambitious and timely account of a liberal Iraqi family in diaspora, but said that “feelings get swept under the carpet in favor of repetitive globe-trotting”.

Filmdienst described Iraqi Odyssey as a documentary in which Samir traces his Iraqi roots through the stories of his family and the decline of Iraq, and said that despite visible breaks caused by family conflicts and the film’s long production, the project felt cohesive.

SRF described it as a monumental documentary that weaves the fate of Samir’s family together with the history of Iraq, and called it a celebration of storytelling marked by black humour despite its tragedy.

On Metacritic, the film has a weighted average score of 60 out of 100, based on five critic reviews, indicating “mixed or average reviews”.

== Festival screenings ==
The film had its world premiere at the Toronto International Film Festival in 2015 and its European premiere at the Berlin International Film Festival in 2015. It was later screened at festivals including the 2015 Tallinn Black Nights Film Festival, the 2015 Gijón International Film Festival, the 2015 Iran International Documentary Film Festival (Cinema Verité), the 2016 Palm Springs International Film Festival, and the 2016 Minneapolis–Saint Paul International Film Festival.

== See also ==
- List of submissions to the 88th Academy Awards for Best Foreign Language Film
- List of Swiss submissions for the Academy Award for Best Foreign Language Film
