= Eldorado (2018 film) =

2018 film

- Film poster
- Directed by: Markus Imhoof
- Written by: Markus Imhoof
- Produced by: Markus Imhoof; Thomas Kufus; Pierre-Alain Meier
- Cinematography: Peter Indergand
- Edited by: Beatrice Babin; Thomas Bachmann
- Music by: Peter Scherer
- Release date: 22 February 2018 (Berlin)
- Running time: 92 minutes
- Countries: Switzerland; Germany
- Language: German

Eldorado is a 2018 Swiss documentary film directed by Markus Imhoof. It premiered at the 68th Berlin International Film Festival in February 2018 and was selected as the Swiss entry for the Best Foreign Language Film at the 91st Academy Awards, but was not nominated. It won the Swiss Film Award for Best Cinematography in 2019.

== Synopsis ==
The film connects Imhoof's childhood experience with an Italian refugee girl during the Second World War to the present-day treatment of refugees and migrants in the Mediterranean, Italy, and Switzerland.

== Production ==
For Eldorado, Imhoof filmed on Italian rescue ships, in a migrant reception centre in Italy, and using a hidden camera in a ghetto in Italy where rejected asylum seekers survived through undeclared work and prostitution. He also filmed in Swiss asylum accommodation, at the border with Italy, and at railway stations.

== Reception ==
=== Awards and nominations ===
Eldorado won awards including a Special Mention at the 2018 Docs Against Gravity Film Festival, Best Documentary Film at the 2019 Bavarian Film Awards, the 2018 Zurich Film Prize, and the 2019 WACC-SIGNIS Human Rights Award. At the 2019 Swiss Film Awards, it won Best Cinematography and was nominated for Best Documentary Film and Best Film Score.

In August 2018, Eldorado was announced as Switzerland’s official submission for the Best Foreign Language Film category at the 91st Academy Awards, but it did not receive a nomination.

=== Critical response ===
Filmdienst described Eldorado as an essayistic documentary that combines personal reflections, letters and other documents with contemporary images and investigative research into the exploitation of irregular migrants, and called it an appeal to human responsibility.

The Guardian described it as a powerful look at the lives of Europe’s refugees and called it a "sober, sombre film".

SRF described the film as more than just another film about boat refugees, highlighting its link between present-day refugee movements and Imhoof’s memories of Giovanna, as well as its hidden-camera footage from a ghetto in Italy.

On Rotten Tomatoes, it has an approval rating of 83% based on six reviews.

== Festival screenings ==
Eldorado had its premiere at the 68th Berlin International Film Festival in February 2018. It was later screened at festivals including the 2018 Locarno Film Festival, 2018 Telluride Film Festival, 2018 Vancouver International Film Festival, 2018 BFI London Film Festival, the 2019 Palm Springs International Film Festival, and the 2019 Solothurn Film Festival.

== See also ==
- List of submissions to the 91st Academy Awards for Best Foreign Language Film
- List of Swiss submissions for the Academy Award for Best Foreign Language Film
