= Nur Sürer =

Turkish actress (born 1954)

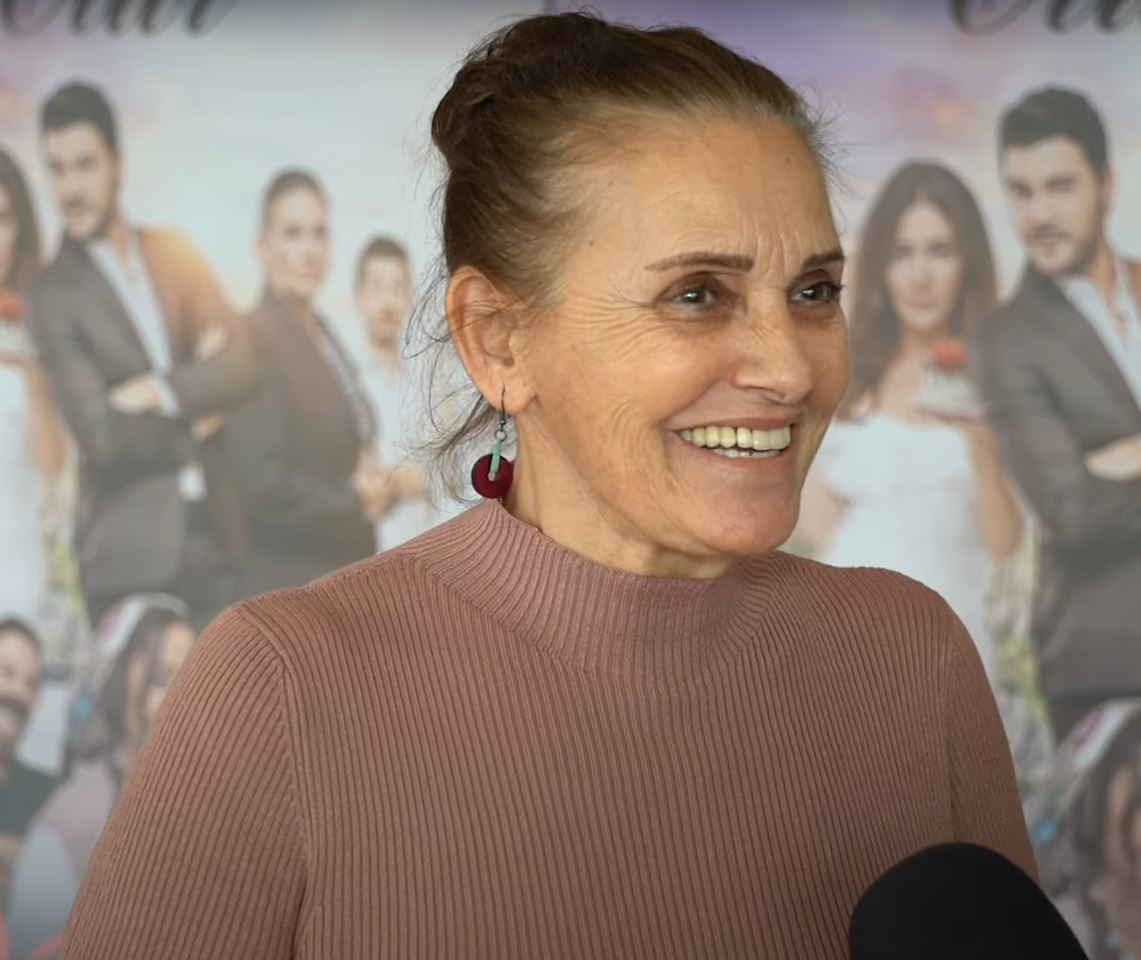
- Sürer in 2020
- Born: 21 June 1954 (age 72); Bursa, Turkey
- Occupation: Actress
- Years active: 1979–present
- Spouse(s): Bülent Kayabaş (m. 1981; div. 1994) Sarp Kuray
- Children: 1

Nur Sürer (born 21 June 1954) is a Turkish actress.

Her debut role was in Bereketli Topraklar Üzerinde, directed by Erden Kiral. She is known for her more politically themed roles, notably with regard to prison conditions and women's rights. So far, she has appeared in more than 40 films.

== Filmography ==
Film
Year	Title	Role	Notes
1971	Sinderella Kül Kedisi		
1979	Bereketli Topraklar Üzerinde	Fatma	
1980	Bir Günün Hikayesi	Zeynep	
1981	Aşka Dönüş		
1983	Derman	Bahar	
1984	Ayna	Zelihan	
1984	Fidan	Fidan	
1985	Dul Bir Kadın	Ayla	
1985	Yılanların Öcü	Haçça	
1986	Ses	Serpil	
1986	Son Urfalı	Gülay	
1987	Karınca Katarı	Gülsüm	
1987	Ateşböceği	Duygu	
1988	Dönüş	Zerbo	
1988	Sadık Dost		
1989	Uçurtmayı Vurmasınlar	İnci	
1990	Kiraz Çiçek Açıyor	Kiraz	
1990	Umuda Yolculuk	Meryem	
1991	Suyun Öte Yanı		
1991	Uzlaşma		
1992	Denize Hançer Düştü		
1993	Korkunun Karanlık Gölgesi		
1994	İz		
1998	Yara		
2000	Karanlığın Gölgesinde Korkular		
2001	Sarı Günler		
2002	Sır Çocukları	Münevver	
2002	Abdülhamit Düşerken	İzzet Hanım	
2003	Kurşun Yarası	Marika	
2010	Kaledeki Yalnızlık	Makbule	
2020	Nasipse Olur	Neriman Hancıoğlu	
2021	Sen Ben Lenin	Gül Ana	
2021	Zuhal	Nebahat	
2024	Cadı	Emine	
2024	Mukadderat	Sultan	
2025	O da Bir Şey mi	Gülistan	
2025	Nasipse Olur 2	Neriman Hancıoğlu	

Television
Year	Title	Role	Notes
1981	Bay Alkolü Takdimimdir	Gül	
1990	Yalancı Şafak		
1993	Son Söz Sevginin	Sevgi	
1997	İlişkiler	Aysu	
2000	Köçek	Naciye	Television film
2002	Havada Bulut	Marika	
2004	Bir Aşk Hikayesi		Television film
2004	Gülizar		Television film
2005	Ihlamurlar Altında	Müjgan	
2006	Kabuslar Evi: Seni Beklerken	Sevgi	
2007–2008	Asi	Neriman Kozcuoğlu	
2009	Kasaba	Seher	
2011	Herşeye Rağmen	Nigar	
2012–2013	Lale Devri		
2012	Sultan		
2013	Tatar Ramazan	Sabiha	
2014	Bana Artık Hicran De		
2017	Kayıt Dışı	Yurt müdürü Melek	
2018–2019	Bir Litre Gözyaşı	Güzin	
2017–2021	Çukur	Fadik Kurtuluş	
2021–2023	Camdaki Kız	Feride İpekoğlu	
2023–2024	Aile	Hülya Soykan	
2025	Başka Bir Gün	Güngör Alsoy	
2026–	Çirkin	Cennet Tunalı	

Streaming series and films
Year	Title	Role	Platform
2017	Masum	Nermin	BluTV
2020	Bir Başkadır	Feray	Netflix original series
2021	Saklı	Sevim	BluTV
2022	Cici	Havva	Netflix original film
2023	Kötü Adamın 10 Günü	İsmet Sultan	Netflix original film
2024	Kül		Netflix original film
2024	Kuvvetli Bir Alkış		Netflix original series

== Awards ==
- 1982 Antalya Golden Orange Film Festival, "Best actress", Bir Günün Hikayesi
- 1989 Antalya Golden Orange Film Festival, "Best actress", Uçurtmayı Vurmasınlar
- 2002 Ankara Film Festival, "Best actress, Sır Çocukları
