= Grüningers Fall =

- Grüningers Fall; The Grüninger Case; L'Affaire Grüninger
- Based on: Grüningers Fall. Geschichten von Flucht und Hilfe. by Stefan Keller
- Written by: Richard Dindo
- Directed by: Richard Dindo
- Music by: Arvo Pärt
- Country of origin: Switzerland
- Original language: German

Production
- Cinematography: Pio Corradi; Rainer Trinkler
- Editors: Richard Dindo; Georg Janett; Rainer Trinkler
- Running time: 100 minutes

Original release
- Network: Schweizer Radio und Fernsehen
- Release: 1997

Grüningers Fall is a Swiss documentary film that was produced in 1997 for the Swiss television SRF. The film focuses on the events of late summer, 1938, when Paul Grüninger saved the lives of up to 3,600 Jewish refugees from Germany and Austria by enabling them to migrate 'illegally' to Switzerland by pre-dating their visas.

== Background ==
The documentary focuses on the fates of Jewish refugees who 'illegally' migrated to Switzerland before World War II. In August 1938, Switzerland closed its borders to Jewish refugees who were trying to flee the Nazi regime. The crossing of the green border into Switzerland by Jews was declared illegal by the Swiss government so refugees had to be sent back to Germany or Austria. Furthermore, hundreds of people without a valid visa tried to cross the green border into Switzerland to be safe from the Holocaust, most of them by crossing the border to the Canton of St. Gallen. This "illegal migration" and the background of these border crossings, its support by officials and citizens in Switzerland, came to the attention of the Swiss immigration police.

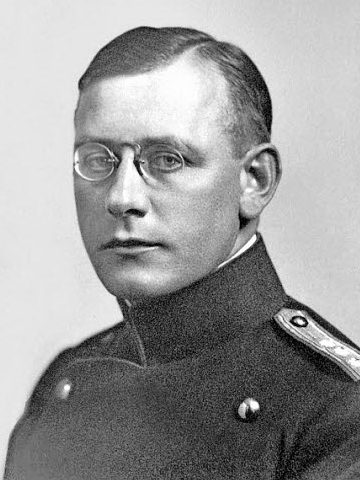
Paul Grüninger assumably in 1939

The events of August 1938 and thereafter and the characters base on facts respectively on historical personalities. Paul Grüninger was berated, dismissed from the police service and sentenced to a fine and loss of pension. Paul Grüninger died in 1972, nearly forgotten in Switzerland and without rehabilitation by the Swiss authorities – in 1971, the Yad Vashem Holocaust memorial foundation in Israel honored Grüninger as one of the Righteous Among the Nations. In 1995 the district court of St. Gallen revoked the judgment against Paul Grünginger, and in 1998 the government of the Canton of St. Gallen paid compensation to his descendants. The Rhine bridge between Diepoldsau (Switzerland) and Hohenems in Austria, which was one of the locations in the film, was named after Paul Grüninger in the summer of 2012.

== Production ==
The shooting took place at the district court of St. Gallen where Paul Grüninger was sentenced by the Swiss authorities in 1940. The contemporary witnesses came from Argentina, Austria, Germany, Belgium, France, and the USA to relate their experiences in Switzerland from 1938 to 1940. The documentary was produced by Lea Produktion GmbH, and based on Stefan Keller's book Grüningers Fall. Geschichten von Flucht und Hilfe.

== Cinema and television ==
Grüningers Fall was produced by the Swiss television SRF. It was premiered in Switzerland on 28 November 1997, at the Berlin International Film Festival on 16 February 1998, in Austria on 20 November 1998, in France on 31 March 1999 and in Argentina on 28 September 2000.

== Awards ==
- 1998: Swiss Film Award for Best Documentary (Bester Dokumentarfilm) for Richard Dindo

== See also ==
- Akte Grüninger, a Swiss-Austrian film (2013)
- Das Boot ist voll, a Swiss film (1981)
- History of the Jews in Switzerland

== Literature ==
- Stefan Keller: Grüningers Fall. Geschichten von Flucht und Hilfe . Rotpunktverlag – WOZ Die Wochenzeitung, Zürich 1998, ISBN 978-3858691576.
