= The Mountain (1991 film) =

1991 film

- Directed by: Markus Imhoof
- Written by: Thomas Hürlimann; Markus Imhoof
- Produced by: Lang Film
- Starring: Susanne Lothar
- Cinematography: Lukas Strebel
- Edited by: Daniela Roderer
- Release date: February 1991
- Running time: 98 minutes
- Country: Switzerland
- Language: Swiss German

The Mountain (German: Der Berg) is a 1991 Swiss drama film directed by Markus Imhoof. It was entered into the 41st Berlin International Film Festival. The film was selected as the Swiss entry for the Best Foreign Language Film at the 64th Academy Awards, but was not accepted as a nominee.

== Cast ==
- Susanne Lothar as Lena
- Mathias Gnädinger as Manser
- Peter Simonischek as Kreuzpointner
- Agnes Fink as Mutter Manser
- Jürgen Cziesla as Direktor
- Adolf Laimböck as Oberst
- Heinrich Beens as Pfarrer
- Ingold Wildenauer as Eisenbahner
- Branko Samarovski as Jetzeler (as Branko Samarowsky)
- Hans-Rudolf Twerenbold as Mann am Stammtisch
- Barbara Schneider as Freundin
- Herbert Müller as Fotograf

== See also ==
- List of submissions to the 64th Academy Awards for Best Foreign Language Film
- List of Swiss submissions for the Academy Award for Best Foreign Language Film
