= The Boat Is Full =

- Directed by: Markus Imhoof
- Written by: Markus Imhoof
- Starring: Tina Engel
- Cinematography: Hans Liechti
- Production company: Limbo Film AG
- Release date: 1981
- Running time: 104 minutes
- Country: Switzerland
- Languages: Swiss-German, German

The Boat Is Full (German: Das Boot ist voll) is a 1981 Swiss drama film written and directed by Markus Imhoof. It was nominated for the Academy Award for Best Foreign Language Film at the 54th Academy Awards as Switzerland’s submission and was entered into the 31st Berlin International Film Festival, where it won the Silver Bear for an outstanding single achievement.

== Background and development ==
The film takes its title and theme from Alfred A. Häsler’s 1967 non-fiction book Das Boot ist voll, which examined Switzerland’s refugee policy during the Second World War. In 1980, Markus Imhoof used the book as the basis for a feature film. The title also echoes the phrase “Das Boot ist voll”, first used in the refugee context by Swiss justice minister Eduard von Steiger in a speech on 30 August 1942.

== Synopsis ==
In the summer of 1942, a small group escapes from a German transport train passing through Switzerland. Led by Judith Krüger and the deserter Karl Schneider, the refugees seek shelter with the Flückiger family. They are hidden and made to appear as a family with children in the hope that they will not be expelled. However, the village policeman, Landjäger Bigler, follows the rules strictly and leaves little room for compassion.

== Cast ==
The cast includes:

- Tina Engel as Judith Krüger
- Hans Diehl as Hannes Krüger
- Martin Walz as Olaf Landau
- Curt Bois as Lazar Ostrowskij
- Gerd David as Karl Schneider

== Release and reception ==
The film premiered in 1981. It was entered into the 31st Berlin International Film Festival in 1981, where it won the Silver Bear for an outstanding single achievement. After its Berlinale award in 1981, it began an international run that led to an Academy Award nomination at the 54th Academy Awards in 1982. It was the first international success of Imhoof’s career.

== Festival screenings ==
The film was later screened at festivals including the Festival international du film d'Histoire in 1995, Festival du film de Genève in 1997, the Ankara International Film Festival in 1998, the Locarno Festival in 2002, the Tribeca Film Festival, the San Francisco Jewish Film Festival, and the Semana Internacional de Cine in 2004, and Filmkunstfest Schwerin in 2005.

== See also ==
- List of submissions to the 54th Academy Awards for Best Foreign Language Film
- List of Swiss submissions for the Academy Award for Best Foreign Language Film
- Grüningers Fall, a 1997 Swiss documentary film
- Akte Grüninger, a 2013 Swiss-Austrian film
