= Tanner (film) =

1985 film

- Der schwarze Tanner
- Directed by: Xavier Koller
- Written by: Xavier Koller; Walter Deuber
- Based on: Der schwarze Tanner by Meinrad Inglin
- Starring: Otto Mächtlinger; Dietmar Schönherr; Renate Steiger; Liliana Heimberg; Susanne Betschart
- Cinematography: Elemér Ragályi
- Edited by: Fee Liechti
- Music by: Hardy Hepp
- Production companies: Catpics AG; SRG; ZDF; ORF; Egli Film + Video AG; Glass Family Trust
- Release date: 1985
- Countries: Switzerland; West Germany; Austria
- Language: Swiss German

Tanner (German: Der schwarze Tanner) is a 1985 Swiss drama film directed by Xavier Koller and based on Meinrad Inglin’s story of the same name. Set in Switzerland during the Second World War, it follows the mountain farmer Kaspar Tanner as he resists official orders to convert pastureland into cropland. In 1986, the film received several awards and was the Swiss entry for the Academy Awards.

== Synopsis ==
In 1941, during the Second World War, Kaspar Tanner runs the Gschwend mountain farm with his family in Switzerland. When the authorities order him to convert part of his mountain meadows into arable land, Tanner resists what he sees as interference in his way of life. As his position hardens, he becomes isolated, returns to self-sufficient farming in the manner of his ancestors, and is eventually imprisoned after becoming involved in black-market trading.

== Cast ==
The cast includes:

- Otto Mächtlinger as Tanner
- Dietmar Schönherr as Steiner
- Renate Steiger as Agnes Tanner
- Heinz Bühlmann as Büelmann
- Giovanni Früh as Res
- Ingold Wildenauer as Strübi
- Susanne Betschart as Lehni Tanner
- Liliana Heimberg as Anna Tanner
- Elisabeth Seiler as Annelies

== Production ==
The film was based on Meinrad Inglin’s story Der schwarze Tanner, about the Schwyz mountain farmer Kaspar Tanner, who refuses during the Second World War to turn pastureland into cropland as ordered by the authorities. It was shot in 1985 in Muotathal, Bisisthal, Ibach, and Schwyz, and was produced in Switzerland, West Germany, and Austria.

== Reception ==
=== Awards ===
In 1986, the film received the National Award of the Swiss Federal Office of Culture, won at the Karlovy Vary Film Festival, received the FIPRESCI Award at the Montreal Film Festival, and was the Swiss entry for the Academy Awards.

=== Critical response ===
A review quoted by Filmpodium described the film’s visual language as vital and sensuous, and argued that Xavier Koller partly detached Inglin’s story from its historical setting in order to update the figure of Tanner. In a 2020 commentary, Tages-Anzeiger compared Kaspar Tanner’s resistance to official wartime directives with public reactions to coronavirus lockdown measures in Switzerland. Filmdienst described the film as a restrained political drama about individual resistance and human dignity, and praised its performances and its calm, controlled direction and cinematography. Cinema.de described the film as an impressive study of civil disobedience and praised its performances and atmosphere.

== Festival screenings ==
The film premiered in January 1986, and later festival screenings included the 29th Haifa International Film Festival in 2013.

== See also ==
- List of submissions to the 59th Academy Awards for Best Foreign Language Film
- List of Swiss submissions for the Academy Award for Best Foreign Language Film
