= Akte Grüninger =

2014 television film directed by Alain Gsponer

- Poster
- Screenplay by: Bernhard Lehner; Mike Schaerer
- Story by: Anne Walser; Golli Marboe
- Directed by: Alain Gsponer
- Theme music composer: Richard Dorfmeister; Michael Pogo Kreiner
- Countries of origin: Switzerland; Austria
- Original language: German

Production
- Producer: Bernd Lange
- Cinematography: Matthias Fleischer
- Running time: 96 minutes

Original release
- Network: SRF
- Release: 2013

Akte Grüninger is a Swiss-Austrian feature film produced in 2013 for the Swiss television SRF. The television film focuses on events in late summer 1938, when Paul Grüninger saved the lives of up to 3,600 Jewish refugees from Germany and Austria by pre-dating their visas, enabling them to migrate 'illegally' to Switzerland.

== Plot ==
In August 1938, Switzerland closed its borders to Jewish refugees who tried to evade the Nazi regime. Germany had annexed Austria in March 1938 and the Nazi persecution of Jews was implemented in Austria. Migration of Jewish people across the green border to Switzerland was declared by the Swiss government to be illegal, and refugees were sent back to Germany and Austria. Hundreds of people without a valid visa tried to cross the border to be secure in Switzerland from the Holocaust, most of them by crossing the border to the Canton of St. Gallen. These "illegal migrations" and the background of the border crossings, and its support by officials and citizens in Switzerland, got the attention of the Swiss immigration police.

Swiss immigration police senior official Heinrich Rothmund (Robert Hunger-Bühler) ordered the police inspector Robert Frei (Max Simonischek), a ruthless, loyal, and authoritarian official, to investigate in the canton of St. Gallen. The Jewish refugees appeared to be supported by parts of the local population, with approval of the police commandant of the Canton St. Gallen, Paul Grüninger (Stefan Kurt). Frei's investigation confirmed the suspicion that police captain Grüninger allowed Jewish refugees to enter without a valid visa. Grüninger also falsified documents and personally helped refugees to illegally cross the border into Switzerland. Grüninger confesses to Frei, but he says he is not acting against the law or against the state security of Switzerland. His motives are based on pure humanity. Frei is overawed by Grüninger's integrity, intransigence and his personal views, and Frei comes to doubt the legality of the investigations.

== Cast ==
In alphabetical order

- Helmut Förnbacher as Valentin Keel
- Aaron Hitz as Ernst Kamm
- Robert Hunger-Bühler as Heinrich Rothmund
- Peter Jecklin as Walter Härtsch
- Julia Jelinek as Jewish woman
- Martin Klaus as Anton Schneider
- Stefan Kurt as Paul Grüninger
- Ursina Lardi as Alice Grünigner
- Beat Marti as Alfons Eigenmann
- Patrick Rapold as Ernest Prodollier
- Monicy Reyes as Ida Kreutner
- Maximilian Simonischek as Robert Frei
- Anatole Taubman as Sidney Dreifuss

== Background ==
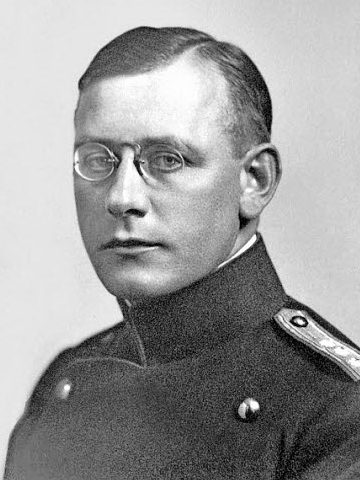
Paul Grüninger assumably in 1939

While the events in August 1938 and thereafter and most of the characters are based on facts and on historical personalities, the role of inspector Frei is fictitious. Paul Grüninger was dismissed by the government without notice in March 1939. Two years later, Grüninger was sentenced by the district court of St. Gallen because of official misconduct and forgery to a fine: he was demoted, dismissed from the police service, sentenced to a fine, and received no pension. In 1995 the district court of St. Gallen revoked the judgment against Paul Grüninger, and in 1998 the government of the Canton of St. Gallen paid compensation to his descendants. Ostracized and accused and slandered as a womanizer and corrupt fraudsters, even as a Nazi by some people in the 2000s, the former chief of police for the rest of his life was no longer fixed point: Paul Grüninger died in 1972, nearly forgotten in Switzerland, without rehabilitation by the Swiss authorities, though in 1971, the Yad Vashem Holocaust memorial foundation in Israel had honoured Grüninger as one of the Righteous Among the Nations.

Already brought back partially into the public memory by some publications beginning in 1984, in 1999 also the so-called Bergier Commission's report took part in Grüninger's rehabilitation, as well in rehabilitating the surviving people who had been convicted during the Nazi period in Switzerland for their assistance to refugees – 137 women and men got public rehabilitation in 2009. The Rhine bridge between Diepoldsau (Switzerland) and Hohenems in Austria, which was one of the locations in the film, was in the summer of 2012 named after Paul Grüninger.

== Production ==
Akte Grüninger was produced by the Swiss television broadcaster SRF, and supported by the arte network and by the Fernsehfonds Austria foundation. The film's plot is complemented by historic cuts. Shooting took place in the canton of St. Gallen and in Austria in late 2012 and early 2013 over 11 weeks, in locations including Mels, Diepoldsau and Hohenems, at the original locations by C-Films, Mecom Fiction GmbH and makido film; post production ended in mid-2013. Production of the film was also supported by the Swiss and Austrian authorities and some organizations, among them the Bundeamt für Kultur (EDI), Zürcher Filmstiftung, city of St. Gallen, Canton of St. Gallen, Swisslos, Vorarlberg Kultur, Landys & Gyr foundation, and Schweizerischer Israelitischer Gemeindebund (SIG).

== Cinema and television ==
The film was broadcast on Arte in December 2013. On Swiss television, Akte Grüninger was shown for the last time on 19 October 2014 at 08:05 pm on SRF 1. It premiered on 23 January 2014 at the Solothurn Film Festival in Switzerland and on 29 January 2014 in Austria; the film was also shown in selected Swiss and Austrian cinemas beginning on 30 January 2014.

== Critical response ==
Neue Zürcher Zeitung claims "the film is daring in its production of Swiss history, with the neuralgic issues that it raises in quite delicate and relevant points - more than most recent movies produced in Switzerland". The film was reviewed by the teacher's association in December 2013 for educational use in Swiss schools, and recommended for general educational purposes in Austria.

== Awards ==
- 2014: Opening film of the Solothurn Film Festival
- 2014: Swiss Film Award, nomination for Stefan Kurt as best actor

== Home media ==
The film was released in 2014 on Blu-ray and DVD in German language.

== See also ==
- Grüningers Fall, a Swiss documentary film (1997)
- Das Boot ist voll, a Swiss film (1981)
- History of the Jews in Switzerland
