= Samir (filmmaker) =

Samir Jamal al Din (born 29 July 1955), known professionally as Samir, is a Swiss filmmaker, film producer and director.

== Life and work ==
Samir was born the son of a Swiss mother and an Iraqi father in Baghdad. Samir's full name is Samir Jamal al Din / Samir Jamal Aldin. His family moved to Switzerland in 1961, where he went to school. He attended the School of Design in Zurich (today's ZHdK), completed an apprenticeship as a typographer (1971–73) and subsequently trained as a cameraman with Condor Films. From 1983, he worked as a freelance director and cinematographer. From 1984 to 1991 he was a writer and member of Videoladen Zurich (Video Store Zurich). In 1994, he and documentary filmmaker Werner Schweizer overtook the Dschoint Ventschr film production company.

From the mid-1980s, Samir began to produce his own films. In the 1990s he worked on behalf of Condor Films as a director of series like Eurocops and television films for German TV stations. His list of works – as a writer, director and/or producer – now includes over 40 short and feature films for cinema and TV.

In 2006 Samir received the Aargau Culture Award (Aargauer Kulturpreis).

Samir has chosen to only use his first name, as explained in this quote:

...why? "Jamal al Din means 'beauty of religion'. I do not know how you would feel if you were not very religious, and would always have to say, 'Hello, my name is Beauty of Religion'," says [he] ...For me Samir is perfect, as that means 'Storyteller'.

== Filmography ==
as director (selection)

- 1984 Stummfilm / Silent Film (short film)
- 1985 Schiefkörper-Video / Division Ring Video
- 1986 Morlove – Eine Ode für Heisenberg / Morlove – An Ode for Heisenberg (feature film, also writer)
- 1988 Filou (feature film, also writer)
- 1991 Immer & Ewig / Always & Forever (feature film, also production, screenplay, cinematography))
- 1992 (It was) Just a job (also writer, camera)
- 1993 Babylon 2 (documentary)
- 1994 Eurocops
- 1994 La productrice
- 1995 Die Drei – Hass; Jetzt oder nie; Todesoperation / The Three – Hatred; Now or Never; Death Surgery
- 1996 Tödliche Schwesternliebe / Deadly Sister Love
- 1997 Angélique (Blind Date)
- 1997 La eta Knabino (short film, also screenplay, production supervisor)
- 1998 Projecziuns Tibetanas (documentary, screenwriting, cinematography, editing)
- 2001 Norman Plays Golf (also screenplay)
- 2002 Forget Baghdad: Jews and Arabs – The Iraqi Connection (documentary, screenwriter, editor, cast)
- 2003 ZwischenSprach / InterimLanguage (documentary, also screenplay)
- 2005 Snow White (feature film, also screenplay)
- 2010 Escher, der Engel und die Fibonacci-Zahlen / Escher, the angels and the Fibonacci numbers (documentary, also screenplay)
- 2014 Iraqi Odyssey (documentary, also production, screenplay, cinematography, editing, cast)

As co-/producer a.o.: documentary film White Terror by Daniel Schweizer (2005), mockumentary Birdseye by Stephen Beckner and Michael C. Huber (2002), feature films Nachbeben / Aftershock by Stina Werenfels (2006), Das Fräulein by Andrea Staka (2006), Opération Libertad by Nicolas Wadimoff (2012), Dawn by Romed Wyder.
