= Samir Naqqash =

Israeli writer

- سمير نقاش
- Born: 1938; Baghdad, Kingdom of Iraq
- Died: 6 July 2004 (aged 65–66); Petah Tikva, Israel
- Education: Hebrew University of Jerusalem
- Writing career
- Language: Arabic

Samir Naqqash (Hebrew: סמיר נקאש, Arabic: سمير نقاش; 1938 in Baghdad – 6 July 2004, in Petah Tikva) was an Israeli novelist, short-story writer, and playwright who immigrated from Iraq at the age of 13.

== Biography ==
Samir Naqqash was born in Baghdad, Iraq, the first of six children born to a wealthy Jewish family. He began school at the age of 4, and started writing at 6. When he was 13, he and his family moved to Israel, and had to live under comparatively harsh conditions in an absorption center. Several years later, his father died, and this had a strong effect on him. Determined to leave Israel to find himself, Naqqash lived in Turkey, Iran, Lebanon, Egypt, India, and the United Kingdom from 1958 to 1962, but faced difficulties and was forced to return to Israel, where he took various jobs.

In the 1970s, he studied Arabic literature and Persian literature at the Hebrew University of Jerusalem, completing his MA in Arabic language and literature in 1978. He was well known in the Arab world and among the Iraqi community in Israel, but only one of his works was translated into Hebrew. Naqqash won the Israeli Prime Ministerial Award for Arabic literature.

Naqqash often called himself an Arab who believed in Judaism. In the documentary "Forget Baghdad" (2002), he said that he had not wanted to go to Israel but was taken there in handcuffs by the Jewish Agency for Israel. He never felt at home in Israel, and considered himself an Iraqi in exile. He continued to publish and write in Arabic. He saw himself as part of the great tradition of Arabic folklore and literature. He was often criticized for his Arabic sounding first name but he refused to change it. After his death, Iraqi expatriates declared their wish to have him buried in Iraq, reasoning that he has shown more dedication to Iraq than any other expatriate.

Naqqash was married, and had one daughter and two sons.

== Writing ==
Naqqash wrote novels, short stories and drama, using both literary Arabic and the Baghdad Jewish Arabic dialect. He published his first literary work in 1958 in the Mapam journal al-Mirsad, and his first collection of short stories "The Mistake" (Al-Khata') in 1971.
