= Markus Imhoof =

Swiss film and theatre director (born 1941)

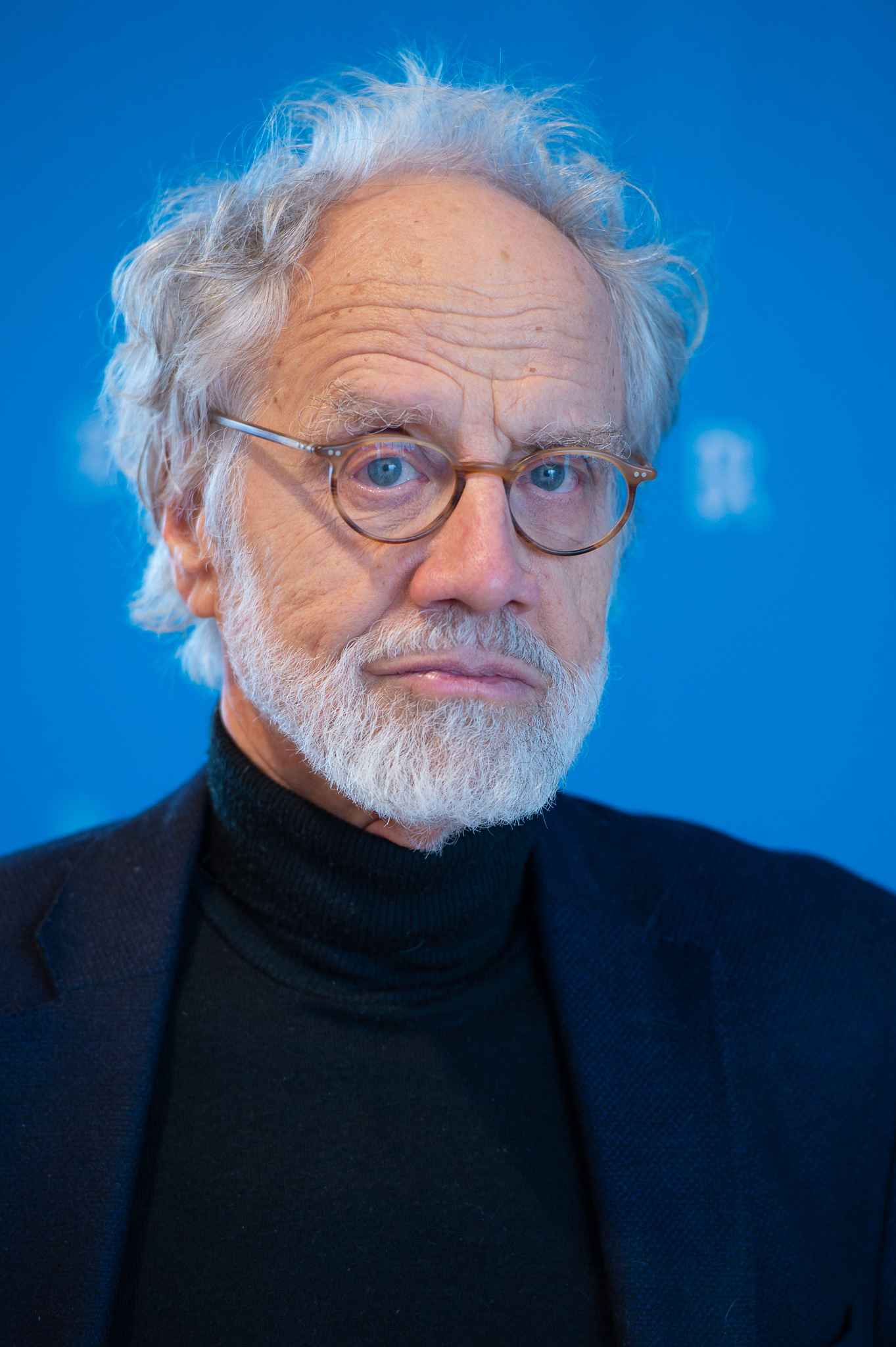
- Born: 19 September 1941 (age 85); Winterthur, Switzerland
- Occupations: Film director Screenwriter
- Years active: 1974–present

Markus Imhoof (born 19 September 1941) is a Swiss film director, screenwriter, and theatre and opera director.

== Biography ==
He began his career as a documentary maker, focusing on controversial issues. His 1968 film Rondo was a critical look at the prison system in Switzerland. The film was banned until 1975. His next picture, Ormenis 199+69 (1969) also met with censorship, as it examined the role and treatment of horses in the cavalry and suggested that the unit ought to be disbanded. Imhoof was forced to make some edits before the film could be screened in public, removing scenes that military veterans found objectionable. Only in 2002 did the film become available in uncensored form. Volksmund - oder man ist was man isst (Vernacular - One Is What One Eats, 1972) was a documentary critical of consumption in society.

Later in his career, Imhoof began directing regular narrative films as well. His film Das Boot ist voll (The Boat Is Full, 1980) received international acclaim for showing the downside of Switzerland's neutral politics during World War II. The film depicted a group of Jewish refugees in 1942 being forced to return to Nazi Germany on order of the Swiss government and thus meeting their deaths in the concentration camps. At the time it was the first Swiss film to deal with this controversial topic. Imhoof's next film, Die Reise (The Journey, 1986) examined Baader-Meinhof's terrorism. Der Berg (The Mountain, 1990) was a psychological study of three people stranded on top of a mountain with only enough food for two of them to survive. Les Raisons du coeur (Flames in Paradise, 1997) is also a psychological study, this time depicting a young woman promised in marriage who switches places with a woman bound for India.

== Theatre ==
- Rise and Fall of the City of Mahagonny (Aufstieg und Fall der Stadt Mahagonny, 1987)
- The Servant (Il Servo 1987)
- The Longing of the Masks (Sehnsucht der Masken, 1988)
- Tales from the Vienna Woods (Geschichten aus dem Wiener Wald, 1989)
- Lulu (1992)
- Hamlet (1993)
- Falstaff (1993)
- The Mastersingers of Nuremberg (Die Meistersinger von Nürnberg, 1996)
- The Seagull (Die Möwe, 1998)
- Così fan tutte (1998)
- Lucia di Lammermoor (1999)
- Nathan the Wise (Lessings Traum von Nathan dem Weisen, 2000)
- The Abduction from the Seraglio (Die Entführung aus dem Serail, 2002)
- Richard II (2002)

== Film ==
As writer/director

- Woe if We Let Go (Wehe, wenn wir losgelassen, 1961) (short film)
- Princess Tuamasi (Prinzessin Tuamasi, 1962) (short puppet film)
- Happy Birthday (1968) (short film)
- Rondo (1968 film) (1968) (short documentary)
- Ormenis 199+69 (1969) (short documentary)
- Swiss Painters and Sculptors (Schweizer Maler und Bildern, CH TV and Pro Helvetia 1970)
- You Are What You Eat (Volksmund – oder man ist, was man isst, 1972) (documentary)
- Escape Risk (Fluchtgefahr, 1974)
- Thaw (Tauwetter, 1977)
- Pipe Polishers (Isewixer, TV 1979)
- The Boat Is Full (Das Boot is voll, 1981)
- Via Scarlatti 20 (1982)
- The Journey (Die Reise, 1986) (adapted from Bernward Vesper's autobiography)
- Little Illusions (Les petites Illusions, 1991)
- Flames in Paradise (Les Raisons du coeur / Flammen im Paradies, 1996)
- More than Honey (2012)
- Eldorado (2018)

As co-author

- The Mountain (Der Berg, 1990) (co-author Thomas Hürlimann)
- Angry Kisses (Zornige Küsse, 1999) (co-author and director Judith Kennel)

== Awards and nominations ==
- Zurich Film Award for Ormenis 199 † 69 (1971)
- International Venice Film Festival Silver Medal for Ormenis 199 † 69 (1971)
- Zurich Film Award for You Are What You Eat (1972)
- Zurich Film Award for Absconding (1975)
- Prix Italia for Pipe Polishers (1979)
- Berlin International Film Festival Silver Bear for The Boat is Full (1981)
- Berlin International Film Festival Otto-Dibelius-Prize for The Boat is Full (1981)
- Berlin International Film Festival OCIC-Prize for The Boat is Full (1981)
- Berlin International Film Festival CIDALC-Prize for The Boat is Full (1981)
- Oscar Nomination, Best Foreign Language Film, for The Boat is Full (1981)
- Prix-Aliza, Paris, for The Boat is Full (1981)
- David di Donatello (René Clair Award) Rome, for The Boat is Full (1982)

== Awards and nominations for More than Honey 2012/13 ==
=== Switzerland ===
- Swiss Film Award for Best Documentary
- Swiss Film Award for Best Film Score
- Zurich Film Award for Best Documentary Film (2012)
- Prix Walo for Best Film Production
- Solothurner Film Festival, Audience Award
- Delémont-Hollywood, Audience Award

=== Germany ===
- German Film Award LOLA for Best Documentary
- German Film Award LOLA for Best Editing (nominated)
- Bavarian Film Award for Best Documentary
- Leipzig Movie Fair, Guild Film Award for Best Documentary
- Darsser Nature Film Festival, Best Film: Man and Nature
- Darsser Nature Film Festival, Audience Award
- Green Screen film festival, Special Jury Award

=== Austria ===
- ROMY Film Award, Best Director, Documentary
- ROMY Film Award for Best Theatrical Documentary
- Austrian Film Award for Best Sound Design

=== United States ===
- Santa Barbara International Film Festival, Best Documentary
- Green Film Festival San Francisco, Best Feature Film Award

=== France ===
- Festival Pariscience – International Festival of Scientific Film, Buffon Prize
- Bourges International Ecological Film Festival, Best Documentary

=== Italy ===
- Gran Paradiso Film Festival, Premio Parco Nazionale Gran Paradiso

=== Great Britain ===
- UK Green Film Festival, Audience Award

=== Romania ===
- Pelicam International Film Festival, Audience Award

=== Ukraine ===
- Apimondia – International Apicultural Congress, Golden Medal World Beekeeping Awards

=== Brazil ===
- Filmambiente International Environmental Film Festival, Special Mention

== Bibliography ==
- Markus Imhoof: Das Boot ist voll. Ein Filmbuch. Photography by George Reinhart and foreword by Friedrich Dürrenmatt. Ammann, Zurich 1983.
- Markus Imhoof and Claus-Peter Lieckfeld:
  - Vom Leben und Überleben der Bienen. orange-press, Freiburg 2012, ISBN 978-3-936086-67-6.
  - More Than Honey: The Survival of Bees and the Future of Our World, Greystone Books, 2015, ISBN 978-1-77164-099-2.
- Ute Kröger (2005). "Markus Imhoof". In Andreas Kotte (ed.). Theaterlexikon der Schweiz / Dictionnaire du théâtre en Suisse / Dizionario Teatrale Svizzero / Lexicon da teater svizzer [Theater Dictionary of Switzerland] (in German). Vol. 2. Zürich: Chronos. pp. 900–901. ISBN 978-3-0340-0715-3. LCCN 2007423414. OCLC 62309181.
