= Shimon Ballas =

Iraqi-Israeli writer (1930–2019)

Shimon Ballas (March 1930 – September 29, 2019) was an Iraqi-Israeli writer.

== Early life ==
Ballas was born in Baghdad in March 1930. He lived within the Christian quarters of Baghdad, and emigrated to Israel in 1951. He became a novelist, and wrote about his experience as an Iraqi Jew. In his youth, he studied within the Alliance Israélite Universelle and developed a passion for writing. His first novella, Al-Jarima al-Ghamida, was written in Arabic while Ballas was still living in Baghdad. He was an active member of the Iraqi Communist Party and joined Maki after emigrating to Israel, having been contacted by party intellectual Emile Habibi who had encountered the writings of Ballas in the party's literary outlets.

== Literary career ==
His work was often reflective of the complicated identity of Iraqi Jews in Israel. After emigrating to Israel, Ballas continued to write in Arabic, his native language, in order to maintain a connection to his land of origin. He first wrote in Hebrew in 1955, when he published an article in the Hebrew journal Kol ha'am under the pen name Adib al-Qas. Alongside other Mizrahi Jewish authors in Israel, he participated in the 'Club of Friends of Arabic Literature in Israel'. The debate on whether to use the Arabic language, the native language of most Mizrahi Jews who had emigrated to Israel and the language they had started their literary career with, or Hebrew, the language of the new state they resided in and the language that would reach a wider Israeli readership, was a constant question within the circles of Mizrahi Jewish writers Ballas partook in.

His 2003 novel Tel Aviv Mizrah, written by reflects the dual identity of the Iraqi Jews. On the one hand, Iraqi Jews hold a connection with their Iraqi origins and nostalgia for life in Iraq, which conflicts with their new Israeli identity, on the other hand. The novel's protagonist, Yousef Shabi, expresses a strong emotional connection to Baghdad, his city of origin, while he is compelled to emigrate to Israel. The relationship between these conflicting identities, as well as the alienation they provoke, are key themes Ballas explores within his novel.

According to historian Ilan Pappé, Ballas "was quite well known in Iraq, where he had grown up as a communist, but was either neglected by mainstream critics in Israel or denigrated as having produced a primitive form of literature."

== Death ==
Ballas died on September 29, 2019, at the age of 89.
