= Xavier Koller =

Swiss film director and screenwriter (born 1944)

- Xavier Koller (holding the Oscar statuette)
- Born: 17 June 1944 (age 82); Schwyz, Switzerland
- Education: Academy of Drama, Zurich, Switzerland
- Occupation: Filmmaker
- Years active: 1972–present

Xavier Koller (born 17 June 1944, Schwyz, Switzerland) is a Swiss film director and screenwriter. He is most known for his work on the Disney live action film Squanto: A Warrior's Tale, an adventure historical fiction film based on the life of Squanto, and his film Journey of Hope, which won the Academy Award for Best Foreign Language Film in 1990.

== Early life ==
After graduating from high school, Koller first went through a four-year apprenticeship as a precision toolmaker and then, after three years of training at the Academy of Drama in Zurich, Switzerland, graduated as an actor/director. The next several years he spent acting and directing at German and Swiss theatres. He did a number of TV-plays as an actor, directed commercials, acted in movies, and then started to write and direct feature films.

== Filmography ==
- Hannibal (1972) (director, screenplay)
- Mädchen, die am Wege liegen (1976) (director: additional scenes)
- Trilogie 1848: Der Galgensteiger (1979) (director, writer) (TV film)
- The Frozen Heart (Das gefrorene Herz) (1979) (director, screenplay)
- Tanner (Der schwarze Tanner) (1985) (director, writer)
- Journey of Hope (Reise der Hoffnung) (1990) (director, writer)
- Squanto: A Warrior's Tale (1994) (director)
- Gripsholm (2000) (director)
- Cowboy Up (2001) (director)
- Highway (2002) (director, writer) (short film)
- Havarie (2006) (director) (TV film)
- Someone Like Me (2012) (director, writer)
- Die schwarzen Brüder (2013) (director)
- Little Mountain Boy (2015) (director, writer)
