= Elie Wiesel bibliography =

This is a bibliography of the works of Elie Wiesel.

== Non-fiction ==
Original Title	Original Publisher, Date, and ISBN	English Title (if not original title)	English Translator, Publisher, Date, and ISBN	Genre
Un di Velt Hot Geshvign	Buenos Aires: 9	And the World Remained Silent		Memoir
La Nuit (Adaptation of Un di Velt Hot Geshvign)	Paris: Les Éditions de Minuit, 1958 ISBN 2-7073-0407-7	Night	Stella Rodway, Hill and Wang, 1960	Memoir
Entre deux soleils (Between Two Suns)	Paris: Éditions du Seuil, 1970 ISBN 2-02-001140-9	One Generation After	Lily Edelman with Elie Wiesel, New York: Random House, 1970 ISBN 0-394-43915-5	Essays, Religion, Interviews
A Jew Today	Random House, 1978 ISBN 0-394-42054-3			Essays, Religion
Images from the Bible: the paintings of Shalom of Safed, the words of Elie Wiesel (with Shalom of Safed)	Overlook Press, 1980 ISBN 0-87951-108-7			Art, Religion
Against Silence: The Voice and Vision of Elie Wiesel (with Irving Abrahamson)	New York: Holocaust Library, 1985 ISBN 0-89604-157-3			
The Six Days of Destruction: Meditations Towards Hope (with Albert H. Friedlander)	Paulist Press, 1988 ISBN 0-8091-2999-X			Religion
Le mal et l'exil: 10 ans après (with Michaël de Saint-Cheron)	Éditions Nouvelle Cité, 1988 0785934219	Evil and Exile (with Michaël de Saint-Cheron)	Jon Rothschild, University of Notre Dame Press, 1990 ISBN 0-268-00922-8	Interviews
A Journey of Faith (with John Joseph O'Connor)	Donald I. Fine, 1990 ISBN 1-55611-217-3			Religion
From the Kingdom of Memory: Reminiscences	Summit, 1990 ISBN 0-671-52332-5			Essays
A Passover Haggadah (illustrated by Mark Podwal)	Simon & Schuster, 1993 ISBN 0-671-79996-7			Religion
Tous les fleuves vont à la mer	Paris: Éditions du Seuil, 1994 ISBN 2-02-021598-5	All Rivers Run to the Sea: Memoirs, Vol. I, 1928–1969	Marion Wiesel, Knopf, 1995 ISBN 0-8052-1028-8	Memoir
Mémoire à deux voix	Paris: Éditions Odile Jacob, 1995 ISBN 2-7381-0283-2	Memoir in Two Voices with François Mitterrand	Richard Seaver and Timothy Bent, Arcade Publishing, 1996 ISBN 1-55970-338-5	Memoir
Et la mer n'est pas remplie	Paris: Éditions du Seuil, 1996 ISBN 2-02-029642-X	And the Sea is Never Full: Memoirs Vol. II, 1969-	Marion Wiesel, Knopf, 1999 ISBN 0-679-43917-X	Memoir
Unpublished		Rashi	Catherine Temerson, Shocken, 2009 ISBN 0-8052-4254-6	Biography

Portraits and Legends theological biography series

Original Title	Original Publisher, Date, and ISBN	English Title (if not original title)	English Translator, Publisher, Date, and ISBN
Célébration hassidique (Hassidic Celebration)	Paris: Éditions du Seuil, 1972 ISBN 2-02-001169-7	Souls on Fire: Portraits and Legends of Hasidic Masters	Marion Wiesel, Random House, 1972 ISBN 0-671-44171-X
Célébration biblique (Biblical Celebration)	Paris: Éditions du Seuil, 1975 ISBN 2-02-004277-0	Messengers of God: Biblical Portraits and Legends	Marion Wiesel, Random House, 1976 ISBN 978-0-394-49740-2
Four Hasidic Masters and Their Struggle Against Melancholy	University of Notre Dame Press, 1978 ISBN 0-268-00947-3		
Five Biblical Portraits	University of Notre Dame Press, 1981 ISBN 0-268-00962-7		
Somewhere a Master: Hasidic Portraits and Legends	New York: Summit, 1982 ISBN 0-671-44170-1		
Sages and Dreamers: Biblical, Talmudic, and Hasidic Portraits and Legends	New York: Summit, 1991 ISBN 0-671-74679-0		
Célébration talmudique. Portraits et légendes	Paris: Éditions du Seuil, 1991 ISBN 2-02-013418-7	Talmudic Celebration: Portraits and Legends	
Célébration prophétique. Portraits et légendes	Paris: Éditions du Seuil, 1998 ISBN 2-02-033284-1	Prophetic Celebration: Portraits and Legends	
Wise Men and Their Tales: Portraits of Biblical, Talmudic, and Hasidic Masters	Shocken, 2003 ISBN 0-8052-4173-6		

== Novels ==
Original Title	Original Publication Location, Publisher, Date, and ISBN	English Title	English Translator, Publisher, Date, and ISBN	Awards
L'Aube	Paris: éditions du Seuil, 1960 ISBN 2-02-000941-2	Dawn	Frances Frenaye, Hill and Wang, 1961 ISBN 0-553-22536-7	
Le Jour	Paris: éditions du Seuil, 1961 ISBN 2-02-000958-7	Day, previously titled "The Accident"	Hill and Wang, 1962 ISBN 0-553-58170-8	
La Ville de la chance	Paris: éditions du Seuil, 1962 ISBN 2-02-000989-7	The Town Beyond the Wall	Atheneum, 1964 ISBN 0-8052-1045-8	Prix de l'Université de la Langue Française (Prix Rivarol); National Jewish Book Council Award
Les Portes de la forêt	Paris: éditions du Seuil, 1964 ISBN 2-02-008988-2	The Gates of the Forest	Frances Frenaye, Holt, Rinehart and Winston, 1966 ISBN 978-0-8052-1044-6	
Le Mendiant de Jérusalem	Paris: éditions du Seuil, 1968 ISBN 2-02-001112-3	A Beggar in Jerusalem	Random House, 1970 ISBN 0-8052-1052-0	Prix Médicis
Le Serment de Kolvillàg	Paris: éditions du Seuil, 1973 ISBN 2-02-001207-3	The Oath	Random House, 1973 ISBN 0-935613-11-0	
Le Testament d'un poète juif assassiné	Paris: éditions du Seuil, 1980 ISBN 2-02-005457-4	The Testament	Summit, 1981 ISBN 0-8052-1115-2	Prix Livre Inter, France; Prix des Bibliothécaires
Le cinquième fils	France: éditions Bernard Grasset, 1983 ISBN 2-246-28921-1	The Fifth Son	Summit, 1985 ISBN 0-8052-1083-0	Grand Prize in Literature from the City of Paris
Le crépuscule, au loin	France: éditions Bernard Grasset, 1987 ISBN 2-246-39061-3	Twilight	Marion Wiesel, Summit, 1988 ISBN 978-0-8052-1058-3	
L'oublié	Paris: éditions du Seuil, 1989 ISBN 2-02-010667-1	The Forgotten	Stephen Becker, Summit, 1992 ISBN 0-8052-1019-9	
Les juges	Paris: éditions du Seuil, 1999 ISBN 2-02-036150-7	The Judges	Knopf, 2002 ISBN 0-8052-1121-7	
Le temps des déracinés	Paris: éditions du Seuil, 2003 ISBN 2-02-054186-6	The Time of the Uprooted	David Hapgood, Knopf, 2005 ISBN 0-8052-1177-2	
Un désir fou de danser	Paris: éditions du Seuil, 2006 ISBN 2-02-085916-5	A Mad Desire to Dance	Catherine Temerson, Knopf, 2009 ISBN 0-8052-1212-4	
Le cas Sonderberg	Paris: éditions Grasset & Fasquelle, 2008 ISBN 2-246-73601-3	The Sonderberg Case	Catherine Temerson, Knopf, 2010 ISBN 0-307-27220-6	
Otage	France: éditions Bernard Grasset, 2010 ISBN 2-246-77581-7	Hostage	Catherine Temerson, Knopf, 2012 ISBN 0-307-59958-2	

== Collection of works ==
- Legends of our Time (Holt, Rinehart and Winston 1968) (Artistically depicted memories)
- Night/Dawn/Day (1985) (First memoir & first two novels)

== Cantatas ==
- Ani Maamin (Random House 1973; subtitled "un chant perdu et retrouvé", music by Darius Milhaud, Op. 441, soprano, 4 reciters. chorus and orchestra)
- A Song for Hope (1987; music by David Diamond, premiered New York June 10, 1987)

== Plays ==
- Zalmen, or the Madness of God (Random House 1974)
- The Trial of God (Random House 1979) (Play)

== Children's literature ==
- The Golem (illustrated by Mark Podwal) (Summit 1983) ISBN 0-671-49624-7
- King Solomon and his Magic Ring (illustrated by Mark Podwal) (Greenwillow 1999)

== Film adaptations ==
Elie Wiesel's novel L'Aube (Dawn) was adapted twice to the screen:

- 1985 by Miklós Jancsó. The French-Hungarian coproduction Dawn is starring Michael York, Philippe Léotard and Christine Boisson.
- 2014 by Romed Wyder. The Swiss-UK-German-Israeli coproduction Dawn is starring Jason Isaacs, Joel Basman and Sarah Adler.

== Additional contributions ==
- "Foreword." In: Vishniac, Roman. A Vanished World. New York: Farrar, Straus and Giroux, 1983. ISBN 0374520232. ISBN 978-0374520236.

A documentary record of the lives of the Jews of Eastern Europe 1934-1939, with commentary by the photographer.

- "Foreword." (pp. XXVII-XXVIII) In: Megargee, Geoffrey P. (ed). The United States Holocaust Memorial Museum Encyclopedia of Camps and Ghettos, 1933-1945, Volume I: Early Camps, Youth Camps, and Concentration Camps and Subcamps under the SS-Business Administration Main Office (WVHA). Bloomington and Indianapolis: Indiana University Press in association with the United States Holocaust Memorial Museum, 2009. doi:10.2307/j.ctt16gzb17.4.
