= The Testament (Wiesel novel) =

1980 novel by Elie Wiesel

- First US edition
- Author: Elie Wiesel
- Translator: Marion Wiesel
- Language: French
- Publisher: Éditions du Seuil; Summit Books (US)
- Publication date: 1980
- Publication place: France
- English publication date: 1981
- Media type: Print (hardback & paperback)
- Awards: Prix du Livre Inter (1980)
- ISBN: 978-2-02-005457-7 (Seuil)
- Preceded by: The Oath
- Followed by: The Fifth Son

Le Testament d'un poète juif assassiné (1980), translated into English as The Testament (1981) is a novel by Elie Wiesel. The Testament, to be followed by The Fifth Son, and The Forgotten mark a thematic change in Elie Wiesel's telling of the Holocaust and its aftermath as Wiesel moves into telling the story of three children of the survivors. The novel takes the form of the memoirs of a Russian Jewish poet, Paltiel Kossova, whose idealism leads him to turn from his Jewish religious heritage towards communism. The novel won the Prix du Livre Inter, and Prix des Bibliothécaires, Prix Interallie 1980 and was nominated for the Prix Concourt.
