= Crépuscule =

Crepuscule may refer to:

- Twilight
- Twilight (Wiesel novel), a novel by Elie Wiesel
- Le Crépuscule des temps anciens (The Twilight of the Bygone Days), a novel by Nazi Boni
- Crepuscule with Nellie, a jazz ballad Thelonious Monk dedicated to his wife
- Les Disques du Crépuscule, a Belgian record label
