= R. Martin Chavez =

American investment banker and entrepreneur

- Born: c. 1964; Albuquerque, New Mexico, U.S.
- Education: Harvard University (BS, MS); Stanford University (PhD)
- Occupations: Investment banker, entrepreneur

Ramon Martin Chavez (born c. 1964) is an American investment banker and entrepreneur. He is vice chairman and partner of Sixth Street Partners. Previously, he served in a variety of senior roles at Goldman Sachs, including chief information officer (2014–2017), chief financial officer, and global co-head of the firm's Securities Division. Marty was also a partner and member of Goldman's management committee. He was the chief technology officer and co-founder of Quorum Software Systems and CEO and co-founder of Kiodex. He is chairman of the board of computational pharmaceutical company Recursion, Board Observer of biotech company Earli and longevity biopharma company Cambrian Biopharma, and board member of Alphabet Inc.

Chavez was appointed president of Harvard University's board of overseers for the 2020–21 academic year.

== Early life and education ==
R. Martin Chavez was born c. 1964. He is a 10th generation New Mexican on his paternal side. His maternal grandparents were immigrants from Mexico and Spain. His mother is a court stenographer. He grew up in Albuquerque, New Mexico, with his four siblings.

Chavez was educated at the Albuquerque Academy, graduating in 1981. He entered Harvard University as a sophomore, and graduated with a bachelor's degree in biochemistry and a master's degree in computer science in 1985. He went on to earn a PhD in medical information sciences from Stanford University.

== Career ==
Chavez started his career in the Silicon Valley. He co-founded Quorum Software Systems in 1989 and served as its chief technology officer from 1989 to 1993.

Chavez joined the J. Aron Currency and Commodities Division of Goldman Sachs in 1993, where he was senior energy strat (strategist, or “strat” in Goldman lingo) until 1997. He then joined Credit Suisse Financial Products, where he was the Global Head of Energy Derivatives from 1997 to 2000. He co-founded Kiodex in 2000, and he served as its chief executive officer and chairman until 2004.

Chavez re-joined Goldman Sachs in 2005 as managing director in IBD Strats. He was later promoted to Global Co-Head of Securities Division Strats, followed by Global Co-Chief Operating Officer of the Equities Franchise.

He served as its chief information officer from 2014 to 2017, when he was succeeded by Elisha Wiesel. He served as its deputy chief financial officer until May 2017, when he succeeded Harvey Schwartz as its chief financial officer. He was a member of Goldman Sachs' Hispanic/Latino Network and Lesbian, Gay, Bisexual and Transgender Network. Chavez was among the most senior Latinos on Wall Street, as well as the most senior openly gay executive at Goldman Sachs.

In September 2019, Chavez announced his retirement from Goldman Sachs.

In May 2021, Chavez announced joining Sixth Street Partners, a global investment firm, as vice chairman and partner.

In July 2022, Alphabet Inc. appointed Chavez to its board of directors.

== Boards ==
Chavez serves on the board of overseers of Harvard University, the board of trustees of the Institute for Advanced Study, and the board of directors of the Los Angeles Philharmonic. Previously, he served on the board of directors of PNM Resources, Inc., and the International Swaps and Derivatives Association (ISDA). A passionate patron of the Arts, his board membership includes the Friends of the High Line, the Foundation for AIDS Research, and the Santa Fe Opera.

Since retiring from Goldman Sachs, Chavez has taken a board observer seat in the early cancer detection and Synthetic Biopsy company Earli, and a Board seat and active role in the AI-driven biomedical technology startup Paige. He also joined the board of directors Recursion, a digital biology company industrializing drug discovery.

Chavez was elected president of Harvard University's board of overseers for the 2020–21 academic year. He was elected to the Board of Directors of The Broad Institute of MIT and Harvard in 2021.

== Personal life ==
Marty resides in New York City and is the father of two.
