= Elie Wiesel Foundation for Humanity =

International organization

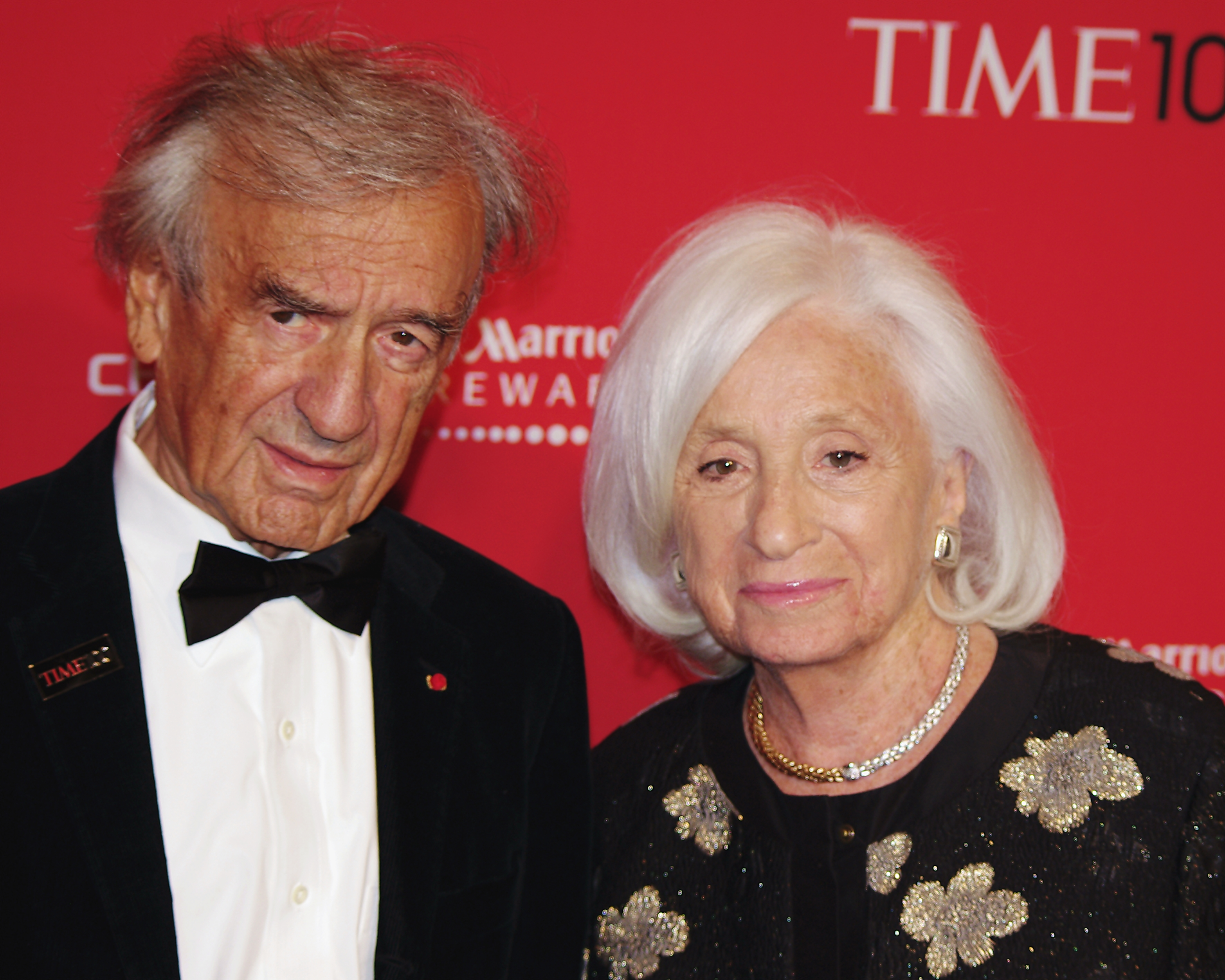
Founders Elie Wiesel and Marion Wiesel (2012).

Elie Wiesel and his wife Marion Wiesel founded the Elie Wiesel Foundation in 1986, the same year he received the Nobel Peace Prize, using the Nobel Prize award money to fund the organization. Wiesel had experienced inequality first hand through the Holocaust, and worked in several different areas involving the Holocaust.

The Foundation's mission statement, created in remembrance of the Holocaust, is "to combat indifference, intolerance and injustice through international dialogue and youth-focused programs that promote acceptance, understanding and equality." Wiesel dedicated the foundation to bringing together people from all over the world to share ideas on political, cultural, religious, and academic boundaries. The foundation organizes contests, awards, and conferences for youths in both the United States and other countries experiencing cultural conflicts. Their son Elisha Wiesel is the Chairman of the Board of the Elie Wiesel Foundation for Humanity, which as of 2024 he was seeking to "reboot."

== History ==
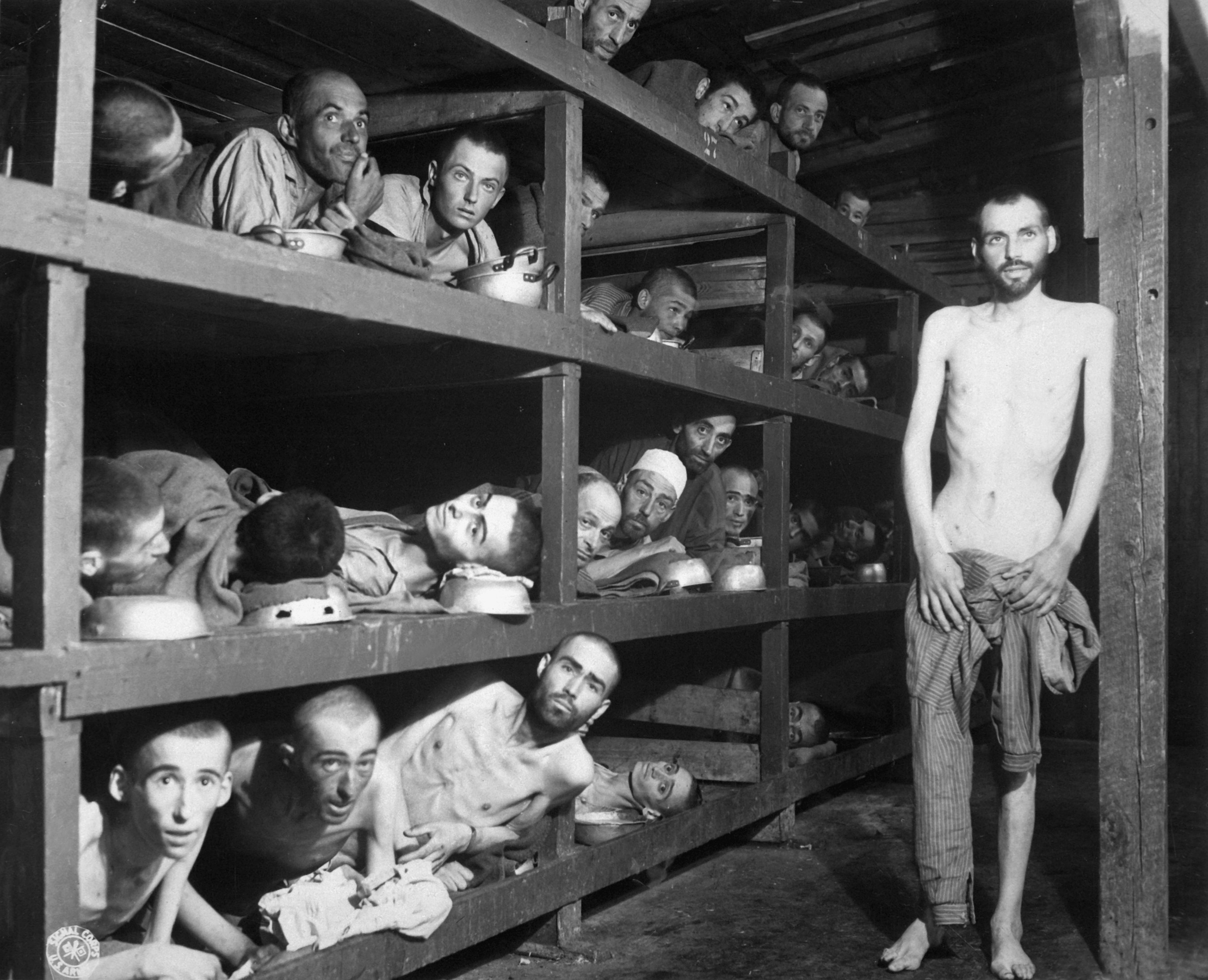
Buchenwald concentration camp, April 16, 1945. Wiesel is in the 2nd row from the bottom, 7th from the left, next to the bunk post.

He shared his experiences in the Holocaust in his memoir, Night, and his name can be seen in the U.S. Holocaust Memorial Museum in Washington, D.C.

The foundation had approximately $15 million in investments managed by Bernard Madoff Investment Securities, which was lost when Madoff's company defrauded its investors of $50 billion in 2008. However, Wiesel would not let this setback prevent the foundation from holding to its mission.

== The Beit Tzipora Centers ==
The foundation opened up two "Beit Tzipora Centers" in Israel for Ethiopian Jews fleeing violence in Africa. The centers are named after Elie Wiesel's younger sister, who was killed at the Auschwitz concentration camp during WWII. The centers were founded in the mid-1990s following the rescue of thousands of Ethiopian Jews from Africa, where they were facing persecution and violence. The refugees were transported by plane from Ethiopia to Israel beginning on May 25, 1991. The evacuation consisted of 18,000 Jews and took place over thirty-six hours. Israeli and American governments had been negotiating for over a year with the Ethiopian government to allow the Jews to leave Ethiopia. The previous policy was that no more than 1,300 Jews could leave every thirty days and was put in place by dictator Mengistu Haile Mariam. However, Mengistu Haile Mariam fled the country earlier in May after receiving pressure from armed rebels. Tesfaye Gebre-Kidan became the new leader and accepted a letter from President George Bush requesting that he allow the exodus of Jews from the country to Israel or the United States would not help him negotiate a truce with the advancing rebels. The idea for these centers came to the Elie Wiesel Foundation for Humanity from seeing the growing need for safe and educational centers for the Ethiopian-Jewish refugees in Israel. Two Beit Tzipora Centers were founded in Israel, in Asheklon and Kiryat Malachi. The centers' missions are to educate the community of Ethiopian-Jews in Israel and give the Ethiopian-Israeli young people the chance to be knowledgeable enough to participate fully in society. Together the two locations of the Beit Tzipora Centers provide more than 1,000 children with after-school programs.

Formally inaugurated on July 25, 2007, the former Ashkelon center was made-over with new classrooms, technology and an auditorium. The Ashkelon center serves students in 1st through 6th grade, runs a summer program for the students, and also provides an adult education program for the surrounding community. Implemented in 2004, Ethiopian students who attend the Ashkelon center and choose to enroll at a higher institute of education are offered the opportunity to volunteer at the Beit Tzipora Ashkelon Center during the school year in exchange for a scholarship from the Elie Wiesel Foundation For Humanity that significantly helps with financing his or her college education. The Beitz Tzipora Center for Study and Enrichment at Kiryat Malachi has continued to grow over the past fifteen years. A new and expanded library was opened in 2002 to support the growing number of students. A new matriculation exam program became available to students through grade twelve in 2004. The Beitz Tzipora Center at Kiryat Malachi also provides programs for students 1st through 12th grade, offers a summer program for the students, and provides an adult education program for the surrounding community.

Israeli school and government officials have seen and commented on the positive, dramatic impact the Beit Tzipora study and enrichment programs have had on the Ethiopian-Jewish children.

== Darfurian refugee program ==
In the fall of 2007 the foundation recognized a need in Israel for a similar center to the Beit Tzipora centers for refugees fleeing the genocide in Darfur. It instituted an after-school program at the Bialik-Rogozin School in Tel-Aviv for the Darfurian refugees, which provides them with English and Hebrew training, computer technology education, tutoring, arts and crafts, and most importantly counseling. Parents of the children are also given access to the language and counseling services. The center strives to not only provide the counseling and education the refugees desperately need but also to help the children of the genocide feel more comfortable with their new lives in Israel.

== Prize in Ethics essay contest ==
The foundation established the award in 1989, as an essay contest for juniors and seniors in 4-year accredited colleges in the United States. The contest "challenges college students in the U.S. to submit essays on the urgent and complex ethical issues that confront us in the modern earth." Each year a suggested topic is provided, but not a requirement. The judges are mainly interested in seeing a modern, ethical dilemma clearly articulated and a real personal voice in the essay, so it is evident how the dilemma affected the student. The essay should also be 3,000–4,000 words, well written, concise, and in English. The first-place winner receives $5,000, the second-place winner $2,500, the third-place winner $1,500, and two honorable mentions receive $500 each.

== Political positions ==
The Elie Wiesel Foundation stated Israel's actions in the Gaza war were "legitimate acts of self-defense against an organization that seeks Israel's destruction" and did not constitute genocide.

== Foundation awards ==
The Humanitarian Award was created by to recognize people that fight injustice, intolerance and share the beliefs and goals of the foundation in their work. The award has been given out every year since the 1989 when France's then first lady Danielle Mitterrand won the award. Some past recipients have been:

Danielle Mitterrand, former First Lady of France, in 1989 for her work with children in Third World countries.

President George H. W. Bush in 1991 for his role in bringing peace and democracy to the Middle East during and after the Gulf War.

King Juan Carlos I of Spain, 1991, for peacefully bringing democracy to his country.

Laura Bush, 2002, for her career in bettering children's education.

Oprah Winfrey, 2007, for her global humanitarian efforts, and education of children.

Nicolas Sarkozy, former French President, won the award in 2008 for renewing ties with WW2 allies and his commitment to peace for Israel and the Middle East.

The awards are modeled after Jewish tzedakah, or collection boxes. These boxes are used to collect donations for the poor anonymously. The Humanitarian Award boxes are modeled to look like those found in eastern European synagogues pre-World War II.

=== Arts for Humanity Award ===
The inaugural Arts for Humanity Award was given to Academy Award winning actor Tom Hanks in October 2012. The award is given to not only recognize artists for their talent, but more importantly for their humanitarian works. A ceremony held at the New York Library's Celeste Bartos Forum recognized Mr. Hank's vast amount of charity work. Most notably he has worked with the Pearl Harbor Memorial Fund, ONE Campaign, Hole in the Wall Gang—set up by fellow actor and friend Paul Newman— and the Got Your 6 Campaign, among many, many others worldwide.
