= Elisha Wiesel =

American businessman (born 1972)

- Born: Shlomo Elisha Wiesel; June 6, 1972 (age 54)
- Education: Yale University (BS)
- Occupation: Businessman
- Years active: 1994–present
- Spouse: Lynn Bartner
- Children: 2
- Parents: Elie Wiesel (father); Marion Erster (mother)

Shlomo Elisha Wiesel (born June 6, 1972) is an American businessman and philianthropist. He is the only child of Holocaust survivor and Nobel Peace Prize recipient, Elie Wiesel. Wiesel worked for Goldman Sachs for 25 years, until 2019. Afterwards, he worked as a hedge fund manager and is currently the chairman of the board of the Elie Wiesel Foundation for Humanity.

== Early life and education ==
Shlomo Elisha Wiesel was born in 1972.

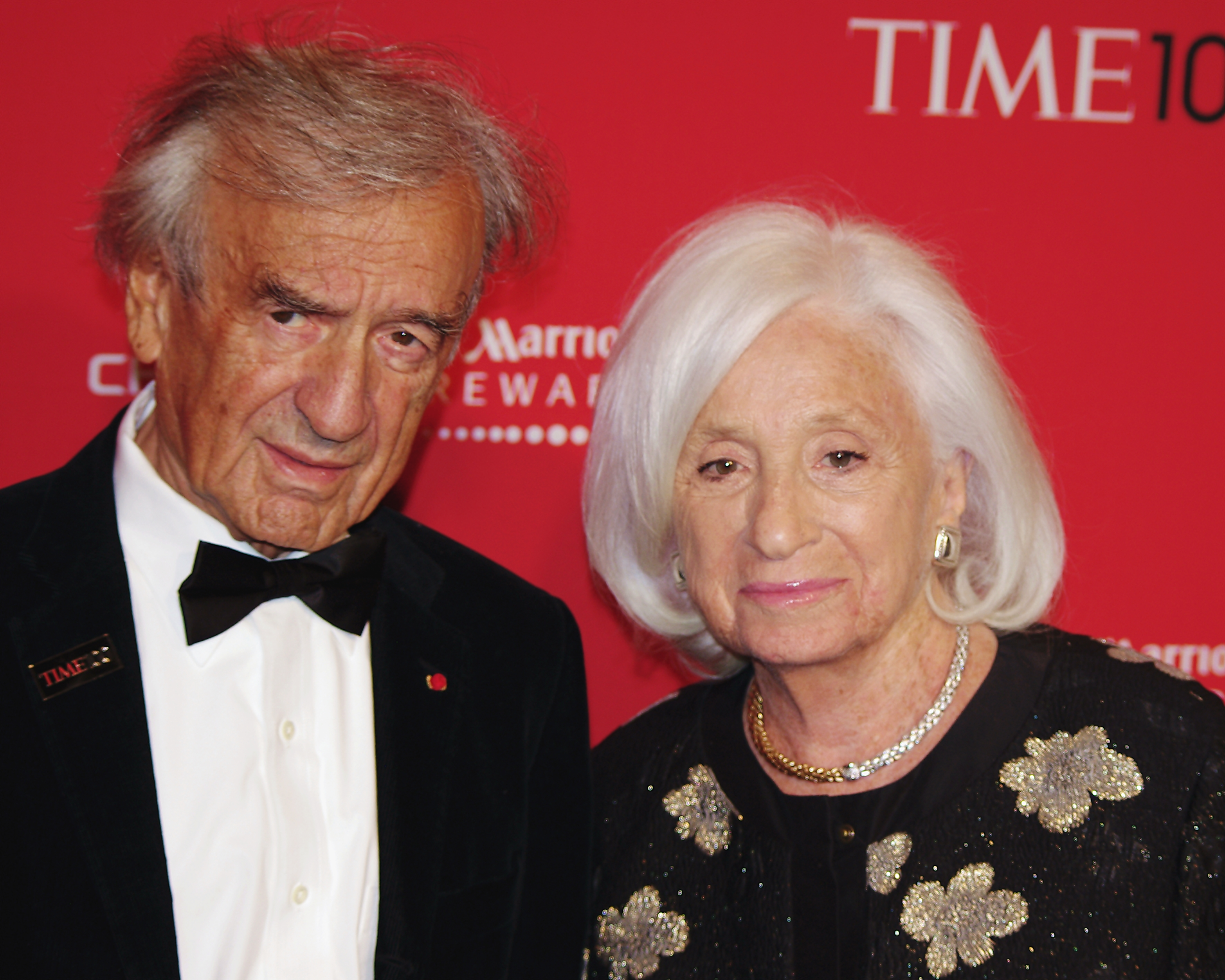
Elie Wiesel and Marion Wiesel, parents of Elisha Wiesel (2012)

His father, Elie Wiesel, was a Holocaust survivor, author, professor, activist, and Nobel Peace Prize recipient of Hungarian Jewish and Romanian Jewish descent, whose hometown was Sighet, Romania. Elisha's paternal grandmother and his father's younger sister were killed in the gas chambers in the Auschwitz concentration camp.

Elisha's mother, Marion Wiesel, was a Holocaust survivor born in Vienna, Austria, of Austrian Jewish descent, who came to the United States shortly after World War II with her family, with the help of HIAS, then known as the Hebrew Immigrant Aid Society.

He was raised on the Upper West Side and Upper East Side of Manhattan in New York City, attending Modern Orthodox yeshiva Ramaz on the Upper East Side, and suburban New Jersey.

Wiesel then attended Yale University, graduating with a B.S. in computer science in 1994. After graduating from Yale, he spent a few months doing basic military training in Israel.

== Career ==
=== Goldman Sachs ===
Wiesel joined the J. Aron commodities division of Goldman Sachs in 1994, after the head of J. Aron strats (the code-writers whose computer models and algorithms power the firm's trading desks) convinced him to give up his initial preference of working in the video game industry. At the time, technology was in its earliest days in banking. At Goldman he worked for Lloyd Blankfein and Gary Cohn, who ended up leading the firm.

In 2002, at the age of 30, he became a managing director, and a partner in 2004. Wiesel later served as the chief risk officer of its securities division (which houses Goldman's technology-intensive trading business), and global head of its securities division desk strategists.

In January 2017, when Wiesel was 44 years old, he succeeded R. Martin Chavez as Goldman's chief information officer, overseeing Engineering (the firm's Technology Division and global strategists groups). Wiesel became the highest-ranked of 9,000 Goldman engineers, who accounted for 25% of the firm's total employees.

=== Later career ===
In December 2019, Wiesel left Goldman Sachs after a 25-year career at the firm. He volunteered on Michael Bloomberg's presidential campaign and also began an archive of his father's writings. In November 2020 Wiesel joined Israeli Tel Aviv-based fintech start-up vendor management firm entrio (formerly, The Floor), as chairman of its board of directors. In March 2023, financial digital platform and enterprise solutions provider FactSet appointed Wiesel to its board of directors.

In May 2023, Wiesel and quantitative investment firm AQR Capital Management alumnus Brian Hurst launched and began co-running the Niche Plus multimanager hedge fund, the first fund of ClearAlpha Technologies, where he is a founding partner and CRO. The firm launched with commitments of several hundred million dollars from AQR founder Cliff Asness, Stable Asset Management, and other institutional investors.

== Philanthropy ==
Wiesel organized fundraisers and has served as a board member for Good Shepherd Services, a Brooklyn-based after-school program charity that provides support for at-risk youths and their families, at Goldman beginning in 2013.

Wiesel is the chairman of the Board of the Elie Wiesel Foundation for Humanity, which he is seeking to "reboot." In February 2024, he announced that the University of South Florida St. Petersburg and the Florida Holocaust Museum would house his father's papers and artifacts.

== Activism ==
In January 2017, he suggested that protesting against Executive Order 13769 ("Protecting the Nation from Foreign Terrorist Entry into the United States") was part of his father's legacy.

In December 2022, Wiesel attended the 15 Days of Light event hosted by New York City Mayor Eric Adams, Rev. Al Sharpton, Vista Equity Partners CEO and Carnegie Hall Chairman Robert F. Smith, Baptist Minister Conrad Tillard, and World Values Network founder and CEO Rabbi Shmuley Boteach. They celebrated Hanukkah and Kwanzaa in a unifying holiday ceremony at Carnegie Hall.

In March 2023, Wiesel testified at a hearing on the treatment of Uyghurs before the United States House Select Committee on Strategic Competition between the United States and the Chinese Communist Party. In April 2024, together with Uyghur leaders he launched a two-day conference in New York City, which included multifaith panels and Xinjiang re-education camp survivors discussing how teachings from the Holocaust can be applied to address the Uyghurs, China's media censorship and propaganda, companies benefiting from forced Uyghur labor, and forced assimilation.

=== Israel ===
As of 2020, Wiesel was a board member of the organization Zioness, founded by Amanda Berman. Since November 2023, Wiesel has been a vocal defender of Israel; in a speech at the 92nd Street Y in Manhattan, he said that the IDF seeks to avoid civilian casualties. He has stated that the accusation of Israel being genocidal in Gaza was blood libel, and that campus protests were "obviously antisemitic". Wiesel along with a group of other prominent Jews sent a letter to Stephen Colbert demanding that he intensely question the NYC Democratic mayoral nominee Zohran Mamdani on his views of Israel when he would appear on his show in 2025.

== Personal life ==
Wiesel and his wife Lynn Bartner-Wiesel have two children.
