= The Trial of God =

Play by Elie Wiesel

The Trial of God (as it was held on February 25, 1649, in Shamgorod)
- Original title: Le procès de Shamgorod tel qu'il se déroula le 25 février 1649
- Original language: French (translated into English by Marion Wiesel)
- Written by: Elie Wiesel
- Characters: Mendel; Avrémel; Yankel; Berish; Hanna; Maria; Priest; Sam, the Stranger
- Genre: Drama; Purimshpiel
- Setting: The fictional village of Shamgorod in 1649, after a pogrom

The Trial of God (as it was held on February 25, 1649, in Shamgorod) (Le procès de Shamgorod tel qu'il se déroula le 25 février 1649, first published in English in 1979 by Random House) is a play by Elie Wiesel about a fictional trial ("Din-Toïre", or דין תּורה) calling God as the defendant. Though the setting itself is fictional, and the play's notes indicate that it "should be performed as a tragic farce", he based the story on events he witnessed first-hand as a teenager in Auschwitz. The play was reimagined for television in God on Trial by Frank Cottrell Boyce.

== Background ==
=== Historical background ===
In introducing the setting for the play, Wiesel gives us an idea of the provenance of the din torah / trial concept: "Its genesis: inside the kingdom of night, I witnessed a strange trial. Three rabbis—all erudite and pious men—decided one winter evening to indict God for allowing his children to be massacred. I remember: I was there, and I felt like crying. But nobody cried." Robert McAfee Brown elaborates on this strikingly bleak description:

The trial lasted several nights. Witnesses were heard, evidence was gathered, conclusions were drawn, all of which issued finally in a unanimous verdict: the Lord God Almighty, Creator of Heaven and Earth, was found guilty of crimes against creation and humankind. And then, after what Wiesel describes as an "infinity of silence", the Talmudic scholar looked at the sky and said "It's time for evening prayers", and the members of the tribunal recited Maariv, the evening service.

To "The Jewish Chronicle", Wiesel gave a somewhat different description of the event, mentioning in the end that the term used in the sentence was chayav, "he owes us something", rather than ‘guilty'.

=== Genre ===
In his introduction to the play, Robert McAfee Brown notes that Wiesel initially had difficulty in recounting the story in an appropriate form—"It did not work as a novel, it did not work as a play, it did not even work as a cantata." After several attempts, the story was written as a play to be performed around the Jewish festival of Purim. This type of play is commonly known by its Yiddish name Purimschpiel. As Wiesel sets the scene on page one of the play, he notes that it "should be performed as a tragic farce: a Purimschpiel within a Purimschpiel". The Purim play provides the drama with a backdrop of revelry and intense celebration for the Jewish victory of Queen Esther over the genocidal plot of Haman in the book of Esther. Purim calls for masks, feasting, drinking, noisemakers, and the creative re-telling of the Esther victory with enthusiastic jeers at every mention of the character Haman. There is a popularly cited line at Megilah 7b of the Talmud that it is Jewish duty to drink on Purim until one cannot distinguish between the phrases "cursed by Haman" and "blessed by Mordecai", which the character Mendel references in the second act of the play.

=== Setting ===
The celebratory atmosphere of Purim is contrasted with the historical setting in Eastern Europe in 1649, shortly after a series of pogroms across the area that is now in modern-day Ukraine and Poland. These pogroms were associated with the Khmelnytsky Uprising, which devastated Jewish villages like the fictional Shamgorod of the play.

=== Other lawsuits against God ===
The idea of suing God is not unique. In 2008, Nebraska State Senator Ernie Chambers filed suit against God, seeking a "permanent injunction ordering Defendant to cease certain harmful activities and the making of terroristic threats". In fiction, writers such as Fyodor Dostoyevsky have taken up the motif.

== Plot ==
As described by author Rosemary Horowitz in her novel, Elie Wiesel and the art of storytelling:

Three wandering minstrels arrive at an inn in the city of Shamgorod on the eve of Purim, a holiday which is replete with disguises and secrets, and which commemorates the defeat of a genocidal plan against the Jewish people. Unbeknownst to the three wanderers, a devastating pogrom has killed all of the city's Jews dead except for Berish the innkeeper, whose wife and sons have been murdered, and his daughter Hanna who has suffered a breakdown as a result of being raped and tortured by the murderous crowd. In the space of three acts, a decision is made to hold a trial of God, a defender of the deity needs to be found, and the trial itself reveals an awful truth about the classical Jewish concept "we are punished because of our sins".

== Connections with the biblical book of Job ==
=== Theodicy question ===
A core concern in both The Trial of God and the book of Job is the theodicy question: how (if at all) can people understand God to be just and good in light of the innocent suffering pervasive in the world? As Robert McAfee Brown expresses the issue, "Surely any God worthy of the name would not only refuse to condone such brutality but would expend all of the divine effort necessary to bring the brutality to a halt, and initiate the work of passionate rebuilding." The issue emerges forcibly in the book of Job, since God is incited "to destroy [Job] for no reason" (Job 2:3).

=== Forensic themes ===
In connection with the theodicean question, both The Trial of God and the book of Job place God on trial. Wiesel's character Berish declares "I—Berish ... accuse Him of hostility, cruelty, and indifference. ... He is... He is... guilty! (Pause. Loud and clear) Yes, guilty!" In a similar thematic vein of accusation, Job cries out, "I would lay my case before [God], and fill my mouth with arguments" (Job 23:4). The reason, of course, is that Job is a righteous person who fears God, yet God "multiplies [Job’s] wounds without cause" in a way Job can only describe as murderous (Job 9:17; 16:11–18).

=== Sam and Job's friends ===
In a provocative twist, Wiesel conflates Sam (i.e., the Devil) with Job's friends (Eliphaz, Bildad, Zophar) from the Hebrew Bible. In the book of Job, the friends provide the voices of theodicy—namely, the ones insistent upon God's justice despite the problem of suffering. In The Trial of God, Sam presents the very arguments the reader would expect from Eliphaz, Bildad, and Zophar. Compare, for example, Sam's claim that suffering is "all because of our sins" and Eliphaz's musings in Job 4:7: "Think now, who that was innocent ever perished? Or where were the upright cut off? As I have seen, those who plow iniquity and sow trouble reap the same."

== Productions ==
The Trial of God was premiered by Bucket Productions at the Bath House Cultural Center in Dallas, Texas on February 2, 2000. It premiered in New York City for the first time as part of The UnConvention: An American Theater Festival, which was held during the 2004 Republican National Convention. It was produced by Stone Soup Theatre Arts and ran from August 27, 2004, through September 11, 2004 at the Abingdon Theater Arts Complex. It also appeared in New York City on March 31, 2007, at the Makor Theatre and featured "traditional dancers from the Kalaniot Dance Troupe and Klezmer musicians from KlezMITron." Was actually premiered in the presence of Elie Weisel at Yuba Community College in 1981 under the direction of David Wheeler.

The Boston Latin School high school drama club performed the second known production of this play over Memorial Day weekend in 1998.

Christopher Newport University, in Newport News Virginia, commissioned an opera based on The Trial of God. Andrew Scott Bell was commissioned to compose the opera with librettist Jason Carney. The opera premiered alongside a performance of the historic children's opera, Brundibár, on November 4, 2021, at the Ferguson Center for the Arts.

== See also ==
- God on Trial, 2008 British television play based on Wiesel's play
