= Elie Wiesel =

American writer and activist (1928–2016)

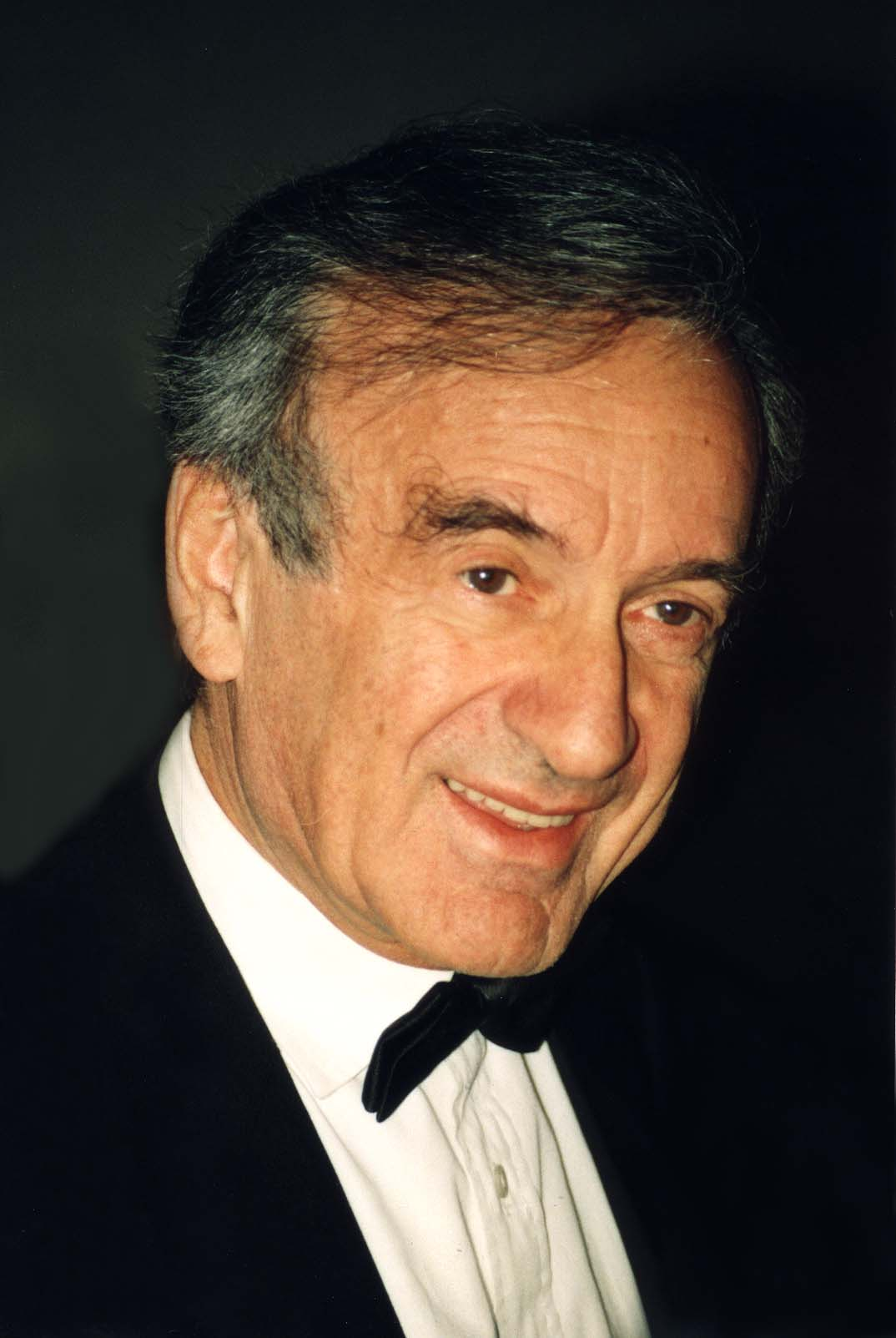
- Wiesel in 1996
- Born: Eliezer Wiesel; September 30, 1928; Sighet, Romania
- Died: July 2, 2016 (aged 87); New York City, New York, U.S.
- Resting place: Sharon Gardens Cemetery
- Citizenship: Romania (until 1940); Hungary (1940–1944); Stateless (1944–1963); United States (1963–2016)
- Education: University of Paris
- Occupations: Writer; Professor
- Spouse: Marion Erster Rose (m. 1969)
- Children: Elisha
- Writing career
- Language: French; English; Yiddish; Hebrew
- Subjects: The Holocaust; religion; philosophy
- Notable work: Night (1960)
- Notable awards: Congressional Gold Medal (1984); French Legion of Honour (Commander, 1984; Grand Officer, 1990; Grand Cross; 2000); Nobel Peace Prize (1986); Presidential Medal of Freedom (1992); Order of the Star of Romania (Grand Officer, 2002); Honorary knighthood (2006)
- Wiesel's voice Wiesel's "The Perils of Indifference" speech. Recorded April 12, 1999

Eliezer "Elie" Wiesel (Note: /ˈɛli viːˈzɛl/ EL-ee vee-ZEL or /ˈiːlaɪ ˈviːsəl/ EE-ly VEE-səl; Yiddish: אליעזר "אלי" װיזל, romanized: Eliezer "Eli" Vizl) (September 30, 1928 – July 2, 2016) was a Romanian-born American writer, professor, political activist, Nobel laureate, and Holocaust survivor. He authored 57 books, written mostly in French and English, including Night, which is based on his experiences as a Jewish prisoner at Auschwitz and Buchenwald during the Holocaust.

As a political activist, Wiesel became a regular speaker on the subject of the Holocaust and advocated for justice in numerous causes around the globe, including that of Soviet Jews and Ethiopian Jews, South African apartheid, the Rwandan genocide, the Bosnian genocide, the War in Darfur, the Kurdish independence movement, the Armenian genocide, Argentina's Desaparecidos, Nicaragua's Miskito people, the Sri Lankan Tamils, and the Cambodian genocide. He was also an outspoken advocate for Israel and frequently weighed in to support the country during escalations of the Arab–Israeli conflict and throughout the Iran–Israel proxy conflict. He backed Netanyahu publicly, including his controversial 2015 Congress speech on Iran, and signed ads praising Jewish settlers. He said Jerusalem "belongs to the Jewish people" and opposed territorial compromise there. He also hosted direct talks to facilitate the Israeli–Palestinian peace process.

Wiesel was a professor of the humanities at Boston University, which created the Elie Wiesel Center for Jewish Studies in his honor. He received a number of awards, including the Nobel Peace Prize in 1986. He was a founding board member of the Human Rights Foundation and remained active in it throughout his life. Wiesel was one of the main figures who spearheaded the establishment of the United States Holocaust Memorial Museum in 1993.

== Early life and education ==
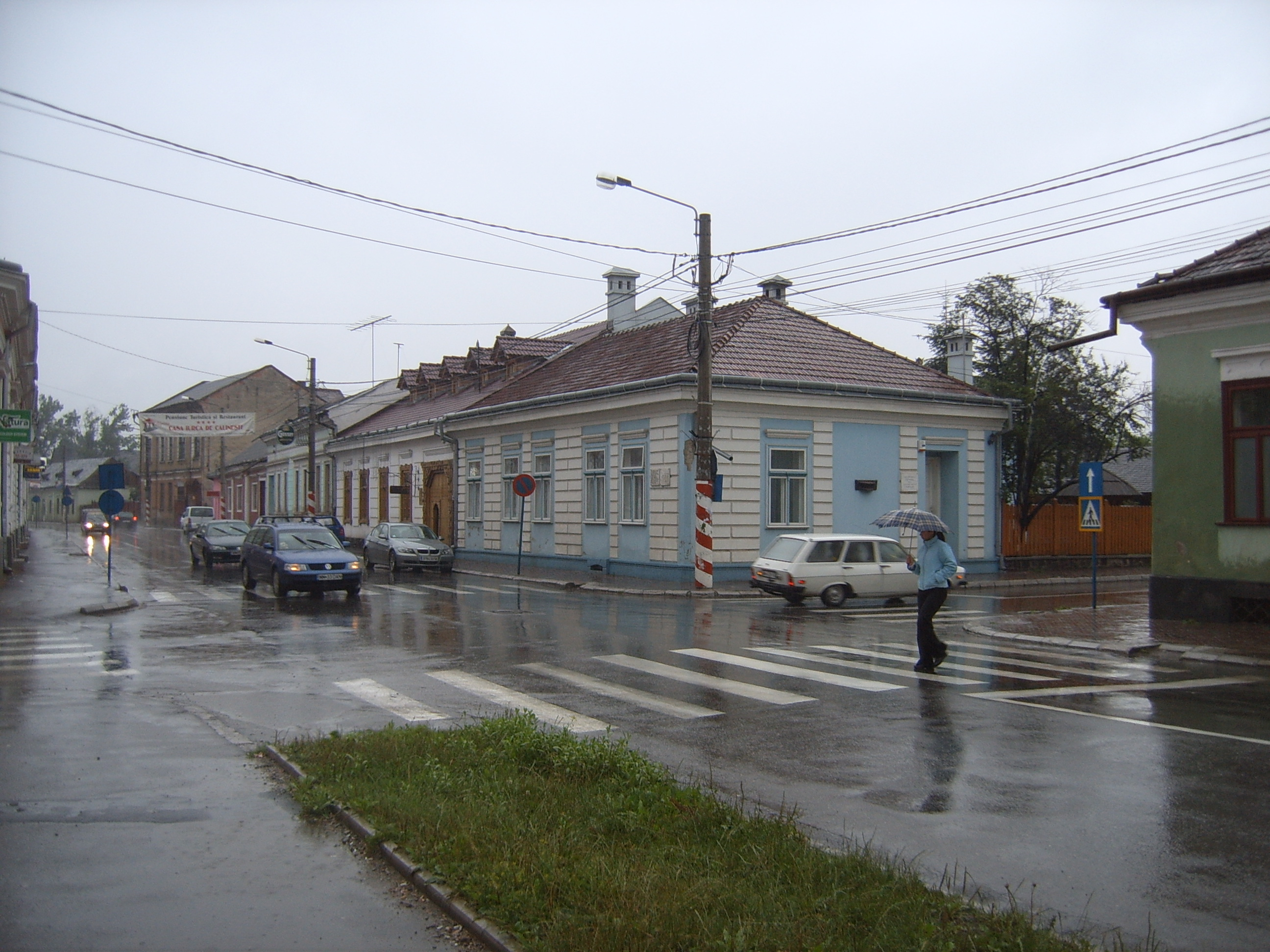
The house in which Wiesel was born in Sighet

Eliezer Wiesel was born in Sighet (now Sighetu Marmației), Maramureș, in the Carpathian Mountains of Romania. His parents were Sarah Feig and Shlomo Wiesel. At home, the family spoke mainly Yiddish in addition to German, Hungarian, and Romanian. Wiesel's mother, Sarah, was the daughter of Dodye Feig, a Vizhnitz Hasid and farmer from the nearby village of Bocskó. Dodye was active and trusted within the community.

Wiesel's father, Shlomo, instilled a strong sense of humanism in his son, encouraging him to learn Hebrew and to read literature, whereas his mother encouraged him to study the Torah. Wiesel said his father represented reason, while his mother Sarah promoted faith. Wiesel was instructed that his genealogy traced back to Rabbi Schlomo Yitzhaki (Rashi), and was a descendant of Rabbi Yeshayahu ben Abraham Horovitz ha-Levi.

Wiesel had three siblings. His older sisters were Beatrice and Hilda, and a younger sister Tzipora. Beatrice and Hilda survived the war, and were reunited with Wiesel at a French orphanage. They eventually emigrated to North America, with Beatrice moving to Montreal, Quebec, Canada. Tzipora, Shlomo, and Sarah were murdered in the Holocaust.

As Wiesel himself stated, his family was Hungarian-speaking and felt little connection to the Kingdom of Romania. As such, they supported the Second Vienna Award, which awarded Northern Transylvania - including Sighet - to the Kingdom of Hungary, despite the fact that Hungary implemented its own antisemitic legislation. Elie Wiesel declared that his mother, Sarah, welcomed the Hungarian occupying troops in Sighet, with her stating that that being under Hungarian rule reminds her of her happy childhood.

== Imprisonment during the Holocaust ==
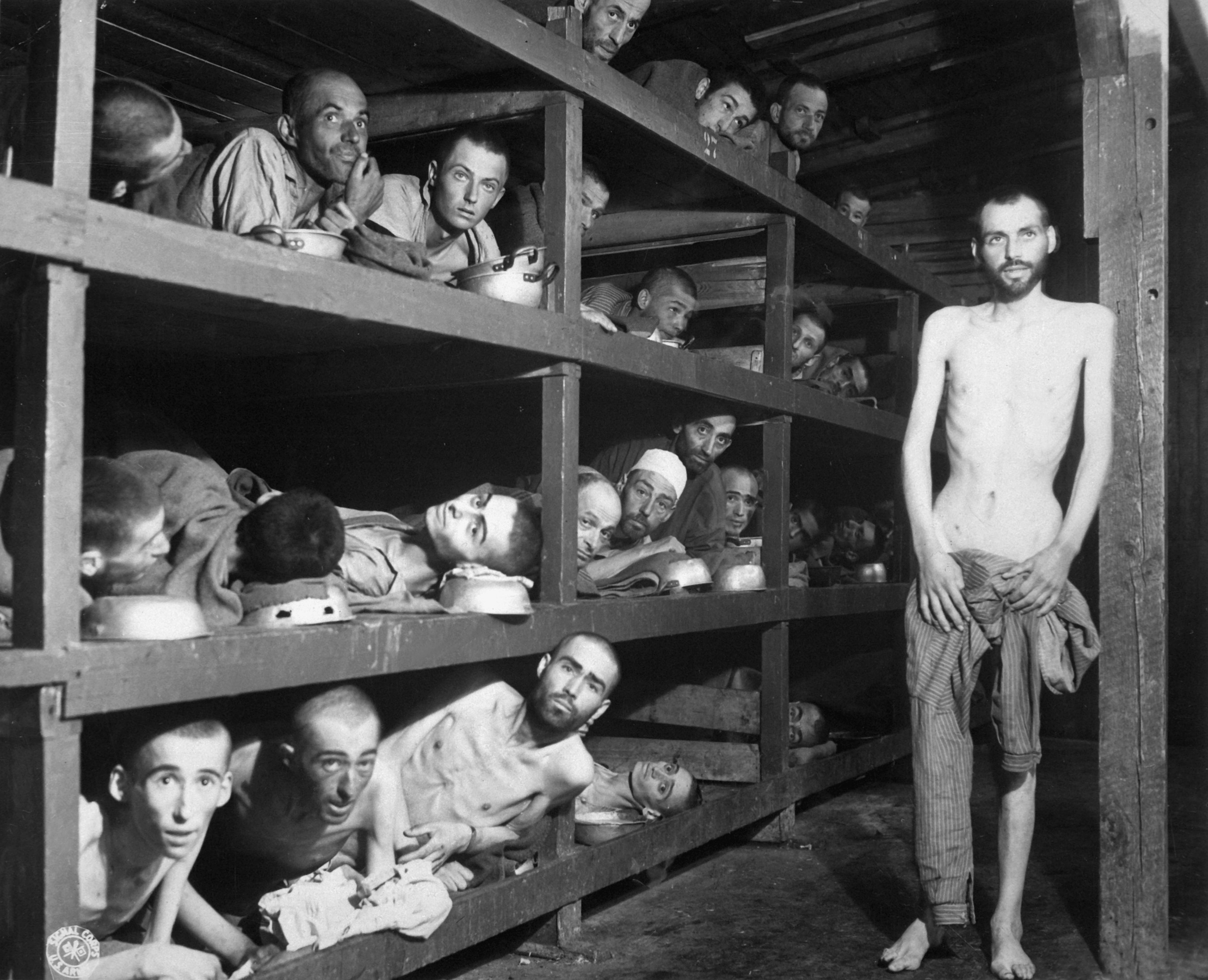
Buchenwald concentration camp, photo taken April 16, 1945, five days after liberation of the camp. Wiesel is in the second row from the bottom, seventh from the left, next to the bunk post.

In March 1944, Germany occupied Hungary, thus extending the Holocaust into Northern Transylvania as well. (Note: In 1940, after the Second Vienna Award, Northern Transylvania, including the town of Sighet (Máramarossziget) was returned to Hungary.) Wiesel was 15, and he, with his family, along with the rest of the town's Jewish population, was placed in one of the two confinement ghettos set up in Máramarossziget (Sighet), the town where he had been born and raised. In May 1944, the Hungarian authorities, under German pressure, began to deport the Jewish community to the Auschwitz concentration camp, where up to 90 percent of the people were murdered on arrival.

Immediately after they were sent to Auschwitz, his mother and his younger sister were murdered in the gas chambers. Wiesel and his father were selected to perform labor so long as they remained able-bodied, after which they were to be murdered in the gas chambers. Wiesel and his father were later deported to the concentration camp at Buchenwald. Until that transfer, he admitted to Oprah Winfrey, his primary motivation for trying to survive Auschwitz was knowing that his father was still alive: "I knew that if I died, he would die." After they were taken to Buchenwald, his father died before the camp was liberated. In Night, Wiesel recalled the shame he felt when he heard his father being beaten and was unable to help.

Wiesel was tattooed with inmate number "A-7713" on his left arm. The camp was liberated by the U.S. Third Army on April 11, 1945, when they were just prepared to be evacuated from Buchenwald.

== Writing career ==
=== France ===
After World War II ended and Wiesel was freed, he joined a transport of 1,000 child survivors of Buchenwald to Ecouis, France, where the Œuvre de secours aux enfants (OSE) had established a rehabilitation center. Wiesel joined a smaller group of 90 to 100 boys from Orthodox homes who wanted kosher facilities and a higher level of religious observance; they were cared for in a home in Ambloy under the directorship of Judith Hemmendinger. This home was later moved to Taverny and operated until 1947.

Afterwards, Wiesel traveled to Paris where he learned French and studied literature, philosophy and psychology at the Sorbonne. He heard lectures by philosopher Martin Buber and existentialist Jean-Paul Sartre and he spent his evenings reading works by Fyodor Dostoyevsky, Franz Kafka, and Thomas Mann.

By the time he was 19, he had begun working as a journalist, writing in French, while also teaching Hebrew and working as a choirmaster. He wrote for Israeli and French newspapers, including Tsien in Kamf (in Yiddish).

In 1946, after learning of the Irgun's bombing of the King David Hotel in Jerusalem, Wiesel made an unsuccessful attempt to join the underground Zionist movement. In 1948, he translated articles from Hebrew into Yiddish for Irgun periodicals, but never became a member of the organization. In 1949, he traveled to Israel as a correspondent for the French newspaper L'arche. He then was hired as Paris correspondent for the Israeli newspaper Yedioth Ahronoth, subsequently becoming its roaming international correspondent.

Excerpt from Night

Never shall I forget that night, the first night in camp, which has turned my life into one long night, seven times cursed and seven times sealed. Never shall I forget that smoke. Never shall I forget the little faces of the children, whose bodies I saw turned into wreaths of smoke beneath a silent blue sky. Never shall I forget those flames which consumed my faith forever. Never shall I forget that nocturnal silence which deprived me, for all eternity, of the desire to live. Never shall I forget those moments which murdered my God and my soul and turned my dreams to dust. Never shall I forget these things, even if I am condemned to live as long as God Himself. Never.

— Elie Wiesel, from Night.

For ten years after the war, Wiesel refused to write about or discuss his experiences during the Holocaust. He began to reconsider his decision after a meeting with the French author François Mauriac, the 1952 Nobel Laureate in Literature who eventually became Wiesel's close friend. Mauriac was a devout Christian who had fought in the French Resistance during the war. He compared Wiesel to "Lazarus rising from the dead", and saw from Wiesel's tormented eyes, "the death of God in the soul of a child". Mauriac persuaded him to begin writing about his harrowing experiences.

Wiesel first wrote the 900-page memoir Un di velt hot geshvign (And the World Remained Silent) in Yiddish, which was published in abridged form in Buenos Aires. Wiesel rewrote a shortened version of the manuscript in French, La Nuit, in 1955. It was translated into English as Night in 1960. The book sold few copies after its initial publication, but still attracted interest from reviewers, leading to television interviews with Wiesel and meetings with writers such as Saul Bellow.

As its profile rose, Night was eventually translated into 30 languages with ten million copies sold in the United States. At one point film director Orson Welles wanted to make it into a feature film, but Wiesel refused, feeling that his memoir would lose its meaning if it were told without the silences in between his words. Oprah Winfrey made it a spotlight selection for her book club in 2006.

In 2025, a documentary by filmmaker Oren Rudavsky, Elie Wiesel: Soul on Fire, examined the history behind the writing and publication of Night. According to The Times of Israel, the film traced Wiesel's postwar years in France, his work as a journalist in Paris, and his decision, about a decade after the Holocaust, to write about his experiences. The article noted that the earliest version of the memoir was an approximately 862-page Yiddish manuscript, Un di velt hot geshvign (And the World Remained Silent), which was published in Argentina before Wiesel later shortened and reshaped the work into the French-language La Nuit (1958) and, eventually, the English-language Night (1960). The documentary also discussed the book's initially limited sales and its later growth in prominence, particularly after increased public interest in Holocaust memory following the 1967 Six-Day War and Oprah Winfrey's 2006 selection of Night for her book club. The Documentary film premiered across in North America on PBS under their American Masters series on January 22, 2026.

=== United States ===
In 1955, Wiesel moved to New York as foreign correspondent for the Israel daily, Yediot Ahronot. In 1969, he married Austrian Marion Erster Rose, who also translated many of his books. They had one son, Shlomo Elisha Wiesel, named after Wiesel's father.

Wiesel developed a close relationship with Menachem Mendel Schneerson, the Lubavitcher Rebbe, with whom he held extended private conversations and corresponded about faith after the Holocaust. Wiesel later said that Schneerson convinced him to marry and build a family, after Wiesel had struggled with the idea of rebuilding his personal life following the Holocaust.

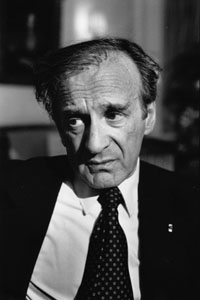
Wiesel in 1987

In the U.S., he eventually wrote over 40 books, most of them non-fiction Holocaust literature, and novels. As an author, he was awarded a number of literary prizes and is considered among the most important in describing the Holocaust from a highly personal perspective. As a result, some historians credited Wiesel with giving the term Holocaust its present meaning, although he did not feel that the word adequately described that historical event. In 1975, he co-founded the magazine Moment with writer Leonard Fein.

The 1979 book and play The Trial of God are said to have been based on his real-life Auschwitz experience of witnessing three Jews who, close to death, conduct a trial against God, under the accusation that He has been oppressive towards the Jewish people.

Wiesel also played a role in the initial success of The Painted Bird by Jerzy Kosinski by endorsing it before it became known the book was fiction and, in the sense that it was presented as all Kosinski's true experience, a hoax.

Wiesel published two volumes of memoirs. The first, All Rivers Run to the Sea, was published in 1994 and covered his life up to the year 1969. The second, titled And the Sea is Never Full and published in 1999, covered the years from 1969 to 1999.

== Academic career ==
Wiesel held the position of Andrew Mellon Professor of the Humanities at Boston University from 1976, teaching in both its religion and philosophy departments. He became a close friend of the president and chancellor John Silber. The university created the Elie Wiesel Center for Jewish Studies in his honor. From 1972 to 1976 Wiesel was a Distinguished Professor at the City University of New York and member of the American Federation of Teachers.

In 1982 he served as the first Henry Luce Visiting Scholar in Humanities and Social Thought at Yale University. He also co-instructed Winter Term (January) courses at Eckerd College, St. Petersburg, Florida. From 1997 to 1999 he was Ingeborg Rennert Visiting professor of Judaic Studies at Barnard College of Columbia University.

== Activism ==
Wiesel and his wife, Marion, started the Elie Wiesel Foundation for Humanity in 1986. He served as chairman of the President's Commission on the Holocaust (later renamed the US Holocaust Memorial Council) from 1978 to 1986, spearheading the building of the United States Holocaust Memorial Museum in Washington, D.C. Sigmund Strochlitz was his close friend and confidant during these years.

The Holocaust Memorial Museum gives the Elie Wiesel Award to "internationally prominent individuals whose actions have advanced the Museum's vision of a world where people confront hatred, prevent genocide, and promote human dignity". The Foundation had invested its endowment in money manager Bernard L. Madoff's investment Ponzi scheme, costing the Foundation $15 million and Wiesel and his wife much of their own personal savings.

=== Support for the Israeli government ===
In 1982, at the request of the Israeli Foreign Ministry, Wiesel agreed to resign from his position as chairman of a planned international conference on the Holocaust and the Armenian genocide. Wiesel then worked with the Foreign Ministry in its attempts to get the conference either canceled or to remove all discussion of the Armenian genocide from it, and to those ends he provided the Foreign Ministry with internal documents on the conference's planning and lobbied fellow academics to not attend the conference.

Wiesel was a co-founder of the Writers and Artists for Peace in the Middle East, a pro-Israel group. In 1984, he signed a letter protesting German arms sales to Saudi Arabia.

==== On the Arab–Israeli conflict ====
Wiesel was critical of Hamas; he condemned them for the "use of children as human shields" during the 2014 Gaza War, and ran an ad in several large newspapers to express this message. The Times refused to run the advertisement, saying, "The opinion being expressed is too strong, and too forcefully made, and will cause concern amongst a significant number of Times readers."

During his lifetime, Wiesel had deflected questions on the topic of the Israeli settlements, claiming to abstain from commenting on Israel's internal debates. According to Lebanese-American columnist Hussein Ibish, despite this position, Wiesel had gone on record as supporting the idea of expanding Jewish settlements into the Palestinian territories conquered by Israel during the Six-Day War; such settlements are considered illegal by the international community. Wiesel often emphasized the Jewish connection to Jerusalem, and criticized the Obama administration for pressuring Israeli prime minister Benjamin Netanyahu to halt the construction of settlements in East Jerusalem, stating that "Jerusalem is above politics. It is mentioned more than six hundred times in Scripture—and not a single time in the Koran ... It belongs to the Jewish people and is much more than a city".

=== March of the Living ===
The March of the Living is an annual educational program that has brought over 300,000 participants from around the world to Poland, where they visit historical sites of the Holocaust, make a two-mile trek from Auschwitz to the former extermination site of Birkenau. Students learn about the experience through live testimony from survivors. Wiesel served on the Presidium for the first March of the Living in 1988, during its founding year. Wiesel attended the March of the Living in 1990, and again in 2005, during the 60th anniversary of the end of WWII. Wiesel addressed over 18,000 in attendance. It was the biggest event in the program's history .

On the 1990 March of the Living, Elie Wiesel addressed the participants at Auschwitz about his concerns about antisemitism. He stated, "We were convinced that antisemitism perished here. Antisemitism did not perish here; its victims perished here." He started to share a story of a young girl, paused, and left the stage. The footage stated Wiesel was simply unable to continue the story. The corroborating article from Eli Rubenstein, who was in attendance that day described that even "the world's most eloquent witness to the Holocaust," was not able to convey the story that led to the fate of this young girl.

In 2017, Wiesel's son, Elisha participated in the March of the Living in memory of his father, honoring his legacy. Since his father's death, he has spoken at the US Holocaust Memorial Museum and Auschwitz, and has begun working on his late father's foundation, the Elie Wiesel Foundation.

Wiesel is included in the publication Witness: Passing the Torch of Holocaust Memory to New Generations. Along with his picture from when he was imprisoned at Buchenwald, he was quoted from the 1990 March of the Living:

"Forever will I see the children who no longer have the strength to cry. Forever will I see the elderly who no longer have the strength to help them. Forever will I see the mothers and the fathers, the grandfathers and grandmothers, the little schoolchildren…their teachers…the righteous and the pious…. From where do we take the tears to cry over them? Who has the strength to cry for them?"

— Elie Wiesel, Witness: Passing the Torch of Holocaust Memory to New Generations, Page 5

=== Honors and awards ===
Wiesel was awarded the Nobel Peace Prize in 1986 for speaking out against violence, repression, and racism. The Norwegian Nobel Committee described Wiesel as "one of the most important spiritual leaders and guides in an age when violence, repression, and racism continue to characterize the world" and called him a "messenger to mankind". It also stressed that Wiesel's commitment originated in the sufferings of the Jewish people but that he expanded it to embrace all repressed peoples and races.

In his acceptance speech he delivered a message "of peace, atonement, and human dignity". He explained his feelings: "Silence encourages the tormentor, never the tormented. Sometimes we must interfere. When human lives are endangered, when human dignity is in jeopardy, national borders and sensitivities become irrelevant."

He received many other prizes and honors for his work, including the Congressional Gold Medal in 1985, the Presidential Medal of Freedom, and The International Center in New York's Award of Excellence. He was also elected to the American Academy of Arts and Letters in 1996.

Wiesel co-founded Moment magazine with Leonard Fein in 1975. They founded the magazine to provide a voice for American Jews. He was also a member of the International Advisory Board of NGO Monitor.

A staunch opponent of the death penalty, Wiesel stated that he thought that even Adolf Eichmann should not have been executed. Wiesel advocated clemency in the Cheshire murder case, instead supporting a life sentence of hard labor for the perpetrators.

Wiesel, a supporter of immigrant's rights, popularized the slogan "No human being is illegal". stating "you who are so-called illegal aliens should know that no human being is illegal. That is a contradiction in terms Human beings can be beautiful or more beautiful, they can be fat or skinny, they can be right or wrong, but illegal? How can a human being be illegal?"

In April 1999, Wiesel delivered the speech "The Perils of Indifference" in Washington, D.C., criticizing the people and countries who chose to be indifferent while the Holocaust was happening. He defined indifference as being neutral between two sides, which, in this case, amounts to overlooking the victims of the Holocaust. Throughout the speech, he expressed the view that a little bit of attention, either positive or negative, is better than no attention at all.

The Romanian Academy granted honorary membership to Elie Wiesel on October 6, 2001.

In 2003, he discovered and publicized the fact that at least 280,000 Romanian and Ukrainian Jews, along with other groups, were massacred in Romanian-run death camps.

In 2005, he gave a speech at the opening ceremony of the new building of Yad Vashem, the Israeli Holocaust History Museum:

I know what people say – it is so easy. Those that were there won't agree with that statement. The statement is: it was man's inhumanity to man. NO! It was man's inhumanity to Jews! Jews were not killed because they were human beings. In the eyes of the killers they were not human beings! They were Jews!

In early 2006, Wiesel accompanied Oprah Winfrey as she visited Auschwitz, a visit which was broadcast as part of The Oprah Winfrey Show. The trip was organized by International March of the Living's Vice Chair, David Machlis. On November 30, 2006, Wiesel received a knighthood in London in recognition of his work toward raising Holocaust education in the United Kingdom.

In September 2006, he appeared before the UN Security Council with actor George Clooney to call attention to the humanitarian crisis in Darfur. When Wiesel died, Clooney wrote, "We had a champion who carried our pain, our guilt, and our responsibility on his shoulders for generations."

In 2007, Wiesel was awarded the Dayton Literary Peace Prize's Lifetime Achievement Award. That same year, the Elie Wiesel Foundation for Humanity issued a letter condemning Armenian genocide denial, a letter that was signed by 53 Nobel laureates including Wiesel. Wiesel repeatedly called Turkey's 90-year-old campaign to downplay its actions during the Armenian genocide a double killing.

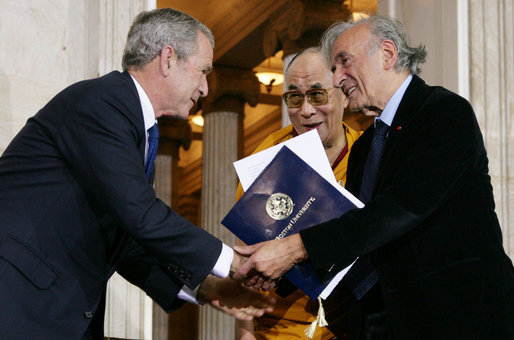
President George W. Bush, joined by the Dalai Lama and Wiesel, October 17, 2007, to the ceremony at the U.S. Capitol in Washington, D.C., for the presentation of the Congressional Gold Medal to the Dalai Lama

In 2009, Wiesel criticized the Vatican for lifting the excommunication of controversial bishop Richard Williamson, a member of the Society of Saint Pius X. The excommunication was later reimposed.

In June 2009, Wiesel accompanied US President Barack Obama and German Chancellor Angela Merkel as they toured the Buchenwald concentration camp. Wiesel was an adviser at the Gatestone Institute. In 2010, Wiesel accepted a five-year appointment as a Distinguished Presidential Fellow at Chapman University in Orange County, California. In that role, he made a one-week visit to Chapman annually to meet with students and offer his perspective on subjects ranging from Holocaust history to religion, languages, literature, law and music.

In July 2009, Wiesel announced his support to the minority Tamils in Sri Lanka. He said that, "Wherever minorities are being persecuted, we must raise our voices to protest ... The Tamil people are being disenfranchised and victimized by the Sri Lanka authorities. This injustice must stop. The Tamil people must be allowed to live in peace and flourish in their homeland."

In 2009, Wiesel returned to Hungary for his first visit since the Holocaust. During this visit, Wiesel participated in a conference at the Upper House Chamber of the Hungarian Parliament, met Prime Minister Gordon Bajnai and President László Sólyom, and made a speech to the approximately 10,000 participants of an anti-racist gathering held in Faith Hall. However, in 2012, he protested against "the whitewashing" of Hungary's involvement in the Holocaust, and he gave up the Great Cross award he had received from the Hungarian government.

Wiesel was active in trying to prevent Iran from making nuclear weapons, stating that, "The words and actions of the leadership of Iran leave no doubt as to their intentions".

== Death ==
Wiesel died on the morning of July 2, 2016, at his home in Manhattan, aged 87. A private funeral service was conducted in his honor at the Fifth Avenue Synagogue, and then he was buried at the Sharon Gardens Cemetery in Valhalla, New York, on July 3.

=== Aftermath ===
Utah senator Orrin Hatch paid tribute to Wiesel in a speech on the Senate floor the following week, in which he said that "With Elie's passing, we have lost a beacon of humanity and hope. We have lost a hero of human rights and a luminary of Holocaust literature."

In 2018, antisemitic graffiti were found on the house where Wiesel was born.

== Legacy ==
In 2026, the tenth anniversary of Wiesel's death was marked by renewed attention to his legacy and his connection with the March of the Living. The Jerusalem Post and the International March of the Living noted that Wiesel served on the Presidium of the first March of the Living in 1988, attended the program in 1990, and returned in 2005, when he addressed more than 18,000 participants during the 60th anniversary year of the end of the Second World War. In a separate reflection, Canadian-American actress and 1990 March of the Living alumna Tara Strong recalled being present at Auschwitz-Birkenau when Wiesel became unable to continue a story about a young girl he remembered from Auschwitz; according to Strong, members of the Toronto student choir then began singing “Eli, Eli,” after which thousands of participants joined in.

== Personal life ==
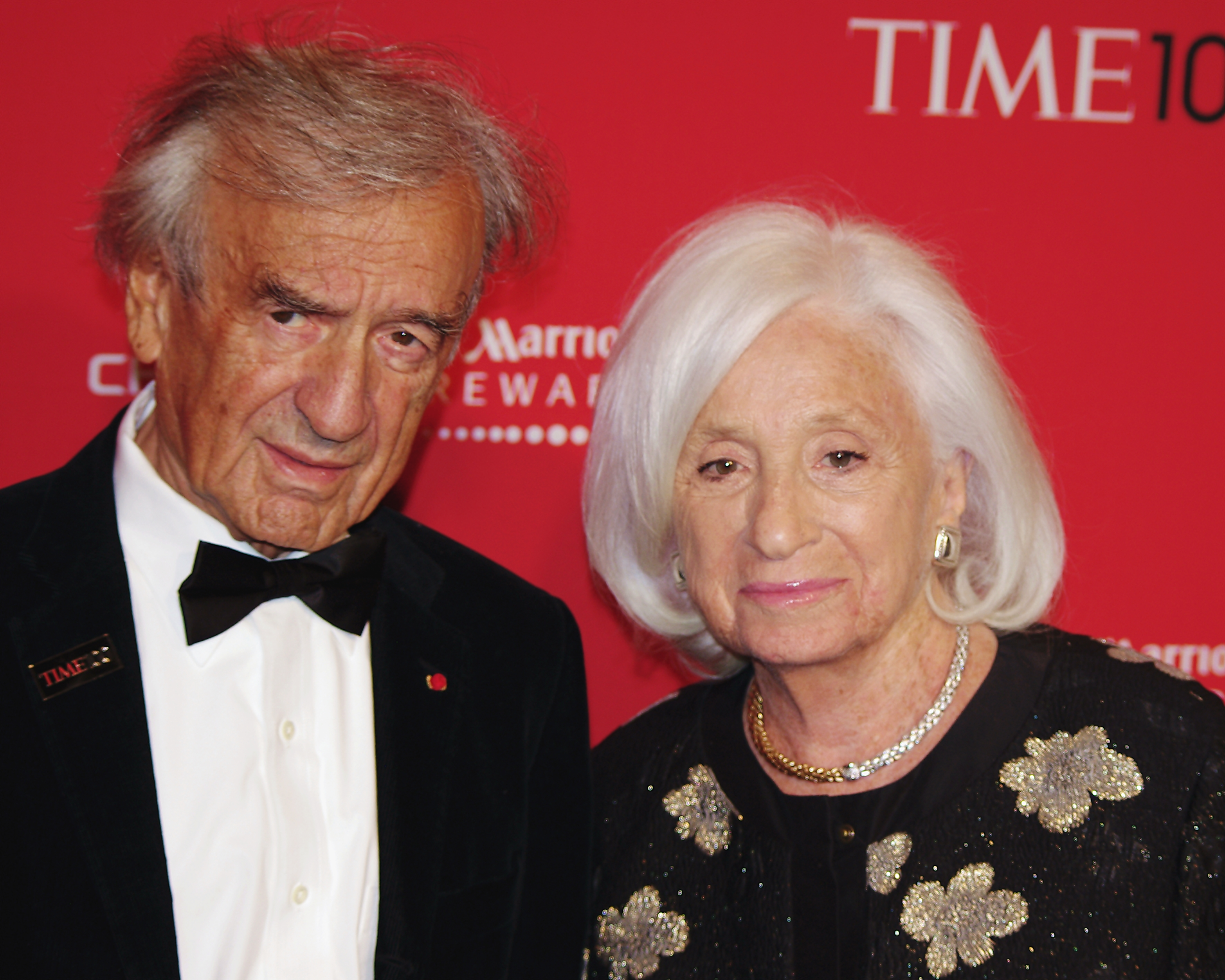
Wiesel and wife Marion at the 2012 Time 100

In 1969 he married Marion Erster Rose, who originally was from Austria and also translated many of his books from French to English. They had one son, Shlomo Elisha Wiesel, named after Wiesel's father. The family lived in Greenwich, Connecticut.

Wiesel was attacked in a San Francisco hotel by 22-year-old Holocaust denier Eric Hunt in February 2007, but was not injured. Hunt was arrested the following month and charged with multiple offenses.

In May 2011, Wiesel served as the Washington University in St. Louis commencement speaker.

In February 2012, a member of the Church of Jesus Christ of Latter-day Saints performed a posthumous baptism for Simon Wiesenthal's parents without proper authorization. After his own name was submitted for proxy baptism, Wiesel spoke out against the unauthorized practice of posthumously baptizing Jews and asked presidential candidate and Latter-day Saint Mitt Romney to denounce it. Romney's campaign declined to comment, directing such questions to church officials.

Marion Wiesel died on February 2, 2025, at the age of 94.

== Awards and honors ==
- Prix de l'Université de la Langue Française (Prix Rivarol) for The Town Beyond the Wall, 1963.
- National Jewish Book Award for The Town Beyond the Wall, 1965.
- Ingram Merrill award, 1964.
- Prix Médicis for A Beggar in Jerusalem, 1968.
- National Jewish Book Award for Souls on Fire: Portraits and Legends of Hasidic Masters, 1973.
- Jewish Heritage Award, Haifa University, 1975.
- Holocaust Memorial Award, New York Society of Clinical Psychologists, 1975.
- S.Y. Agnon Medal, 1980.
- Jabotinsky Medal, State of Israel, 1980.
- Prix Livre Inter, France, for The Testament, 1980.
- Grand Prize in Literature from the City of Paris for The Fifth Son, 1983.
- Commander in the French Legion of Honor, 1984.
- U.S. Congressional Gold Medal, 1984.
- Four Freedoms Award for the Freedom of Worship, 1985.
- Medal of Liberty, 1986.
- Nobel Peace Prize, 1986.
- Grand Officer in the French Legion of Honor, 1990.
- Presidential Medal of Freedom, 1992
- Niebuhr Medal, Elmhurst College, Illinois, 1995.
- Golden Plate Award of the American Academy of Achievement, 1996, presented by Awards Council member Rosa Parks at the academy's 35th annual Summit in Sun Valley, Idaho.
- Grand Cross in the French Legion of Honor, 2000.
- Order of the Star of Romania, 2002.
- Man of the Year award, Tel Aviv Museum of Art, 2005.
- Light of Truth award, International Campaign for Tibet, 2005.
- Honorary Knighthood, United Kingdom, 2006.
- Honorary Visiting professor of humanities, Rochester College, 2008.
- National Humanities Medal, 2009.
- Norman Mailer Prize, Lifetime Achievement, 2011.
- Loebenberg Humanitarian Award, Florida Holocaust Museum, 2012.
- Kenyon Review Award for Literary Achievement, 2012
- Nadav Award, 2012.
- S. Roger Horchow Award for Greatest Public Service by a Private Citizen, an award given out annually by Jefferson Awards, 2013.
- John Jay Medal for Justice John Jay College, 2014.
- Bust of Wiesel was carved on the Human Rights Porch of the Washington National Cathedral in Washington, D.C., 2021.
- 18th stamp in the U.S. Postal Service's Distinguished Americans series

=== Honorary degrees ===
Wiesel had received more than 90 honorary degrees from colleges worldwide.

- Doctor of Humane Letters, Lehigh University, Bethlehem, Pennsylvania, 1985.
- Doctor of Humane Letters, DePaul University, Chicago, Illinois, 1997.
- Doctorate, Seton Hall University, New Jersey, 1998.
- Doctor of Humanities, Michigan State University, 1999.
- Doctorate, McDaniel College, Westminster, Maryland, 2005.
- Doctor of Humane Letters, Chapman University, 2005.
- Doctor of Humane Letters, Dartmouth College, 2006.
- Doctor of Humane Letters, Cabrini College, Radnor, Pennsylvania, 2007.
- Doctor of Humane Letters, University of Vermont, 2007.
- Doctor of Humanities, Oakland University, Rochester, Michigan, 2007.
- Doctor of Letters, City College of New York, 2008.
- Doctorate, Tel Aviv University, 2008.
- Doctorate, Weizmann Institute, Rehovot, Israel, 2008.
- Doctor of Humane Letters, Bucknell University, Lewisburg, Pennsylvania, 2009.
- Doctor of Letters, Lehigh University, Bethlehem, Pennsylvania, 2010.
- Doctor of Humane Letters, Washington University in St. Louis, 2011.
- Doctor of Humane Letters, College of Charleston, 2011.
- Doctorate, University of Warsaw, June 25, 2012.
- Doctorate, The University of British Columbia, September 10, 2012.
- Doctorate, Pontifical University of John Paul II, June 30, 2015
- Doctorate of Humane Letters, Fairfield University, May 22, 1983

== Works ==
- Un di velt hot geshvign / Night (1956)
- The Jews of Silence (1966)
- Dawn (1961)
- Day (1962)
- The Gates of the Forest (1964)
- The Oath (1973)
- The Testament (1980)
- The Fifth Son (1983)
- Twilight (1988)
- The Forgotten (1992)
- The Judges. 1999.

== See also ==
- The Boys of Buchenwald – documentary about the orphanage in which he stayed after the Holocaust
- Canadian Institute for the Study of Antisemitism
- Elie Wiesel bibliography
- Elie Wiesel National Institute for Studying the Holocaust in Romania
- Genesis Prize
- God on Trial – a 2008 joint BBC / WGBH Boston dramatization of his book The Trial of God
- Holocaust research
- List of civil rights leaders
- List of investors in Bernard L. Madoff Securities
- List of Jewish Nobel laureates
- March of the Living
