= Lawsuits against supernatural beings =

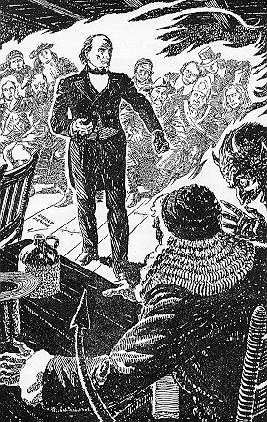
Daniel Webster argues on behalf of a plaintiff while the Devil whispers into the judge's ear.

Lawsuits against supernatural beings, such as God or the devil, have occurred in real life and in fiction. Issues debated in the actions include the problem of evil and harmful "acts of God".

== Actual suits ==
=== Betty Penrose ===
In 1969, Arizonan lawyer Russel T. Tansie filed a suit against God on behalf of his secretary, Betty Penrose, seeking $100,000 in damages. Penrose blamed God for his "negligence" in allowing a lightning bolt to strike her house. The lawsuit was filed in a Californian court under the argument that God owned property in Sonoma County, California, due to the Limeliters singer Lou Gottlieb transferring the deed of his Morning Star Ranch to God about a week before. The deed was ruled invalid, due to God not being able to take possession of the property, and hence Penrose's lawsuit was also ruled invalid.

=== Gerald Mayo ===
United States ex rel. Gerald Mayo v. Satan and His Staff was a 1971 case filed before the United States district court for the Western District of Pennsylvania in which Gerald Mayo alleged that "Satan has on numerous occasions caused plaintiff misery and unwarranted threats, against the will of plaintiff, that Satan has placed deliberate obstacles in his path and has caused plaintiff's downfall" and had therefore "deprived him of his constitutional rights". (Depriving someone of constitutional rights is prohibited under several sections of the United States Code.) Mayo filed in forma pauperis—that is, he asserted that he would not be able to afford the costs associated with his lawsuit and that they therefore should be waived. The Court refused the request to proceed in forma pauperis because the plaintiff had not included instructions for how the U.S. Marshal could serve process on Satan.

=== Ralph Perry Forbes ===
In 1986, Ralph Perry Forbes, an American perennial candidate and neo-Nazi, known for filing numerous federal lawsuits over racial and political issues, sued the Russellville School District, Arkansas Department of Education, the Arkansas Education Association, an official of the education department, the Church of Satan, and Satan. The suit was on the behalf of all children and Jesus, as well as himself, in an effort to stop the education system from celebrating Halloween, which Forbes called "the Christmas of the anti-Christs". Federal judge George Howard Jr. heard the case. Local lawyer John Wesley Hall Jr. defended the devil "at no cost"; Hall argued that Forbes did not provide enough evidence that Satan "transacts business, owns property or committed any torts" in the state, and that the allegations against Satan could not be proven in court due to the First Amendment, so advocated for the suit's dismissal. The suit was ultimately dismissed by Judge Howard.

=== Pavel Mircea ===
In 2005, a Romanian prisoner Pavel Mircea, serving 20 years after being convicted of murder, filed a lawsuit against the Romanian Orthodox Church, as God's representatives in Romania, for failing to keep him from the Devil, essentially stating that his baptism had been a binding contract.

The suit was dismissed by the court in Timisoara in 2007, ruling that "God is not a person in the eyes of the law and does not have an address."

=== Ernie Chambers ===
In the U.S. state of Nebraska, State Senator Ernie Chambers filed a suit in 2008 against God, seeking a permanent injunction against God's harmful activities, as an effort to publicize the issue of public access to the court system. The suit was dismissed because God could not be properly notified, not having a fixed address. The Judge stated, "Given that this court finds that there can never be service effectuated on the named defendant this action will be dismissed with prejudice". The senator, assuming God to be singular and all-knowing, responded "The court itself acknowledges the existence of God. A consequence of that acknowledgement is a recognition of God's omniscience. Since God knows everything, God has notice of this lawsuit."

Nebraska media inaccurately reported that Chambers filed the lawsuit in response to another lawsuit that he considered to be frivolous and inappropriate. Chambers clarified that, on the contrary, his intention was to demonstrate that no lawsuit should be considered frivolous. He feels anyone should be able to sue anyone else, "Little Orphan Annie no less than Daddy Warbucks and Warren Buffett." By suing God he "emphasized that attempts by the Legislature to prohibit the filing of any lawsuit would run afoul of the Nebraska Constitution's guarantee that the doors to the courthouse must be open to everyone."

Two responses to Chambers' case were filed. The first was from a Corpus Christi lawyer, Eric Perkins, who wanted to answer the question "what would God say". The second was filed in Douglas County, Nebraska District Court. The source of the second response, claiming to be from God, is unclear as no contact information was given.

On July 30, 2008, local media sources reported that the Douglas County District Court was to deny Chambers' lawsuit because Chambers had failed to notify the defendant. However, on August 1, Chambers was granted a court date of August 5 in order to proceed with his lawsuit. "The scheduling hearing will give me a chance to lay out the facts that would justify the granting of the motion," Chambers was quoted as saying. He added, "Once the court enters the injunction, that's as much as I can do ... That's as much as I would ask the court. I wouldn't expect them to enforce it."

However, a judge threw out the case, saying that God was not properly served due to his lack of a listed home address. As of November 5, 2008, Chambers had filed an appeal to the Nebraska Supreme Court. The former state senator John DeCamp and E. O. Augustsson in Sweden, asked to represent God. Augustsson's letters, mentioning the Bjorn were stricken as "frivolous". The Appeals Court gave Chambers until February 24 to show that he notified DeCamp and Augustsson of his brief, which he did. The case was finally closed on February 25 when the Nebraska Court of Appeals dismissed the appeal and vacated the order of the district court. The court quoted cases according to which "[a] court decides real controversies and determines rights actually controverted, and does not address or dispose of abstract questions or issues that might arise in hypothetical or fictitious situation or setting".

=== Chandan Kumar Singh ===
Chandan Kumar Singh, a lawyer from Bihar, India, sued the Hindu god Rama for mistreating his wife, the goddess Sita. The court dismissed his case, held on 1 February 2016, calling it "impractical".

== Fictional suits ==
=== Premodern depictions ===
Consolatio peccatorum, seu Processus Luciferi contra Jesum Christum is a 14th century tract by Jacobus de Teramo which depicts the Devil suing Jesus Christ for trespass following Christ's descent into Hell.

=== Against God ===
In the Australian comedy film The Man Who Sued God (2001), a fisherman played by Billy Connolly successfully challenges the right of insurance companies to refuse payment for a destroyed boat on the common legal exemption clause of an act of God. In a suit against the world's religious institutions as God's representatives on Earth, the religious institutions face the dilemma of either having to state God does not exist to uphold the legal principle, or being held liable for damages caused by acts of God.

An Indian film, OMG – Oh My God! (2012), has a protagonist Kanji Mehta (played by Paresh Rawal) file a lawsuit against God when his shop is destroyed in an earthquake and the insurance company refuses to take his claim, stating that "act of God" is not covered under his insurance policy. The Telugu film Gopala Gopala is a remake of this, as is the 2016 Kannada-language Mukunda Murari.

The American film Frank vs. God (2014) is a comedy that takes up the theme of a man down on his luck who sues God in a court of law.

Former Auschwitz concentration camp inmate Elie Wiesel is said to have witnessed three Jewish prisoners try God in absentia for abandoning the Jewish people during the Holocaust. From this experience, Wiesel wrote the play and novel The Trial of God (1979). It is set in a Ukrainian village during 1649 after a massacre of the Jewish inhabitants, possibly as part of the Khmelnytsky Uprising. In the play, three traveling minstrels arrive in the village, having intended to perform a play. Instead they perform a mock trial of God for allowing the massacre. The verdict is innocent, after a stirring lone defence by a stranger who, in a twist, is revealed to be the Devil.

The television play God on Trial (2008), written by Frank Cottrell Boyce, depicts a scene similar to that attributed to Elie Wiesel, but is also described by Boyce as "apocryphal". In it, three Auschwitz prisoners sue God. The trial returns a guilty verdict, although with likely reasons for appeal.

=== Against the Devil ===
==== Writing ====
- John Milton's Paradise Lost.
- Goethe's Faust.
- "The Devil and Daniel Webster", a short story by Stephen Vincent Benét, is about a lawsuit in which a New Hampshire farmer who sells his soul to the Devil is defended at law by Daniel Webster.

==== Film ====
- The Devil and Daniel Webster, a 1941 fantasy film adapted from Benét's short story.
- Suing the Devil, a 2010 Christian thriller film about a man who sues the devil for $8 trillion.

==== Television ====
- "The Devil and Homer Simpson", a segment in The Simpsons episode "Treehouse of Horror IV", which parodies The Devil and Daniel Webster whereby Homer Simpson must face the Devil (Ned Flanders) in a court of law after selling his soul for a donut.

== See also ==
- A Contract with God, a short story collection: in the title story, a man struggles with the events of his life in light of what he believes to be a contract with God.
- God in the Dock, an anthology of C. S. Lewis' Christian apologetics expressing his contention that modern human beings, rather than considering themselves as being judged by God, prefer to try God while acting as his judge
- Last Judgment
- The Story of Mankind, a 1957 film featuring a celestial court case where humanity is on trial for its existence.
- Legalism (theology), the view that obedience to law, not faith in God's grace, is the pre-eminent principle of redemption
- Levi Yitzchok of Berditchev, known as the "defense attorney" for the Jewish people, because it was believed that he could intercede with God on their behalf
- Misotheism, hatred of God
- Religious law
- Sanhedrin trial of Jesus, the Biblical account of Jesus' trial before the Sanhedrin council
- Separation of church and state
- Devil's advocate
