= The Fifth Son =

Novel by Elie Wiesel

- First edition cover
- Author: Elie Wiesel
- Translator: Marion Wiesel
- Publication date: August 24, 1983
- Awards: Crime Writers of Canada Award for Best Novel (2005)

Le cinquième fils (1983), translated as The Fifth Son (1985) by Marion Wiesel, is a novel by Elie Wiesel continuing the thematic material of The Testament. It won the Grand Prize in Literature from the city of Paris.
