= God on Trial =

2008 British television film

- Written by: Frank Cottrell-Boyce
- Directed by: Andy De Emmony
- Starring: Antony Sher; Rupert Graves; Jack Shepherd; Dominic Cooper; Eddie Marsan; Stellan Skarsgård
- Music by: Nick Green; Tristin Norwell
- Country of origin: United Kingdom
- Original language: English

Production
- Producers: Mark Redhead; Jemma Rodgers; Anne Mensah
- Running time: 90 min.
- Production companies: Hat Trick Productions; WGBH Boston

Original release
- Network: BBC (United Kingdom); PBS (United States)
- Release: 3 September 2008

God on Trial is a 2008 British television play written by Frank Cottrell-Boyce, starring Antony Sher, Rupert Graves and Jack Shepherd. The play takes place in Auschwitz during World War II. The Jewish prisoners put God on trial in absentia for abandoning the Jewish people. The question is whether God has broken his covenant with the Jewish people by allowing the Germans to commit genocide on them. It was produced and shown by the BBC on 3 September 2008. Production was supported by PBS, which screened the play as part of its Masterpiece anthology.

The play is based on the Elie Wiesel play The Trial of God. Cottrell-Boyce describes this tale as "apocryphal". Wiesel later stated that the event was true, and that he had witnessed it. According to Cottrell-Boyce, producer Mark Redhead "had been trying to turn the story into a film for almost 20 years by the time he called me in 2005 to write the screenplay."

== Plot ==
Jewish prisoners in a barrack at Auschwitz question why God has let this happen to them, His chosen people, and decide to try God in absentia to get at the answer. This becomes an extended debate on why God permits evil. The first theory proposed, that God must allow people to choose actions that lead to horrible results because human freedom of will is such an important value—a solution many consider the true one—is rejected with contempt, and the debate continues. Finally, one of the men, a rabbi, reviews the record of God's deeds against Israel’s enemies in the Hebrew Bible, and draws the conclusion that God is not good, and that he has simply been on their side throughout history. He recounts that he had seen the phrase “God is with us” engraved on the belts of the German guards, concluding that God has now turned against the Jews once and for all. The account is so powerful that the others accept it, and there is a moment of silence. "So what do we do?" says one. "We pray," says the proposer of the theory grimly, and they rise, face one way and begin to pray. The scene fades to the present day, with visitors to Auschwitz standing stunned in the same space; the ghostly figures of the prisoners are seen among them, praying.

== Cast ==
- Joseph Alessi as Kapo
- Josef Altin as Isaac
- Ashley Artus as Ricard
- Alexi Kaye Campbell as Doctor (presumably Josef Mengele)
- Dominic Cooper as Moche
- Lorcan Cranitch as Blockaltester
- Stephen Dillane as Schmidt
- Rupert Graves as Mordechai
- François Guetary as Jacques
- David de Keyser as Hugo
- Agnieszka Liggett as Tour Guide
- Louise Mardenborough as Emily
- Eddie Marsan as Lieble
- André Oumansky as Jacob
- Blake Ritson as Idek
- Jack Shepherd as Kuhn
- Antony Sher as Akiba
- Stellan Skarsgård as Baumgarten
- René Zagger as Ezra
- Dailly Hilaire

== Score ==
The music for the film was especially commissioned and composed by Nick Green and Tristin Norwell.

== Reception ==
Reviews were overwhelmingly positive. Sam Wollaston in The Guardian found it "powerful and thoughtful stuff, with some fine performances by some fine actors – Antony Sher, Rupert Graves, Dominic Cooper." Remarking that Cottrell-Boyce wrote the piece from a position of personal faith, James Walton in The Telegraph observed, "Yet, as each of the characters put forward a different view on the question of God and suffering, it was clear that he was willing to interrogate his beliefs with real ferocity." This was a complex piece, and "as the fierceness of the intellectual and emotional grip tightened, it was impossible to imagine any halfway-thoughtful viewers, of whatever prior convictions, not having a disturbing sense of their own ideas coming under sustained and convincing attack." In a long review for The Times, Tim Teeman had great praise for the cast: "The performances were so strong it felt a privilege to watch the actors, among them Antony Sher, Rupert Graves, Stephen Dillane and Jack Shepherd." He also praises director Andy de Emmony's "brilliant, arresting sleight of hand... [mixing] the prisoners, naked and shorn, together with the present-day touring party in the gas chamber." For The Independent, Thomas Sutcliffe remarked on Sher's role as the play's smouldering fuse: "Every now and then you saw Antony Sher, davening silently in a corner of the barracks. Like a loaded gun in a Chekhov play, you knew he was going to go off eventually and that it would be significant when he did, and indeed it was his explosive inventory of God's biblically attested crimes that finally swung the judges in favour of a guilty verdict."

Opposite fierce competition from the much-trailed, eagerly awaited debut episode of ITV's four-part-time travel fantasy series, Lost in Austen, and an episode of the BBC's celebrity genealogy show, Who Do You Think You Are?, featuring Esther Rantzen, God on Trial attracted 700,000 viewers on BBC2, a 3% share of the audience, according to overnight returns.

When the show was shown in the United States on PBS, the Los Angeles Times said "They are big topics addressed with a striking lack of sentimentality, quite a feat considering the setting." The San Francisco Chronicle echoed the British reviewers in praising the "brilliant script" the "subtle wonders at every turn" in DeEmmony's direction, and remarked that "It seems trivial even to try to single out one superb performance from virtually every other superb performance."

== Distribution ==
God on Trial aired on BBC2 on Wednesday 3 September 2008 and on PBS in the Masterpiece Contemporary strand on 9 November 2008.

== See also ==
- Lawsuits against God
