= The Gates of the Forest =

The Gates of the Forest (French: Les Portes de la forêt) is a 1964 novel by Elie Wiesel, published by Éditions du Seuil.

== Preface ==
The preface of the book includes a story often referred to as "God made man because He loves stories." The story imagines that a series of historical Hasidic leaders each followed a 3-step ritual for accomplishing the rescue of his respective community through a miracle. The founder of the tradition was Yisroel ben Eliezer (Baal Shem Tov and the three steps were to go to a specific area of a forest to meditate, say a specific prayer and light a fire. However, each of the subsequent leaders each forgot a step of the ritual that had been passed on to him. Dov Ber of Mezeritch remembered two of the three steps, Moshe-leib of Sasov knew one of the two steps passed on to him, but Israel Friedman of Ruzhyn couldn't even remember the single step that he had been given. He said to God, "...All I can do is to tell the story...." Yet even just remembering the story about the tradition was, as he hoped, sufficient for obtaining the needed miracle. Wiesel explains this sufficiency by closing the story with the statement, "God made man because He loves stories."
