= Mark Podwal =

American artist and physician (1945–2024)

- Podwal in 2007
- Born: June 8, 1945; New York City, U.S.
- Died: September 13, 2024 (aged 79); Harrison, New York, U.S.
- Education: Queens College; New York University Grossman School of Medicine
- Known for: Watercolor, Drawing, Painting
- Spouse: Ayalah Siev-Or (m. 1977)
- Children: 2
- Website: http://www.markpodwal.com

Mark Howard Podwal (June 8, 1945 – September 13, 2024) was an American artist, author, filmmaker and physician. He may have been best known initially for his drawings on The New York Times Op-Ed page. In addition, he is the author and illustrator of numerous books. Most of these works—Podwal's own as well as those he has illustrated for others—typically focus on Jewish legend, history and tradition. His art is represented in the collections of the Metropolitan Museum of Art, the Victoria and Albert Museum, the Israel Museum, the National Gallery of Prague, the Jewish Museums in Berlin, Vienna, Stockholm, Prague, New York, among many other venues.

== Background ==
Podwal was born in Brooklyn in 1945, and was raised in Flushing, Queens. His mother immigrated to the United States from Poland. One of his uncles was refused entry to the United States due to a misdiagnosed illness, and was later killed in the Holocaust.

Podwal attended Queens College and the New York University Grossman School of Medicine, and became a dermatologist. He drew as a hobby throughout his early years, before beginning to publish in 1971.

== Projects and Installations ==
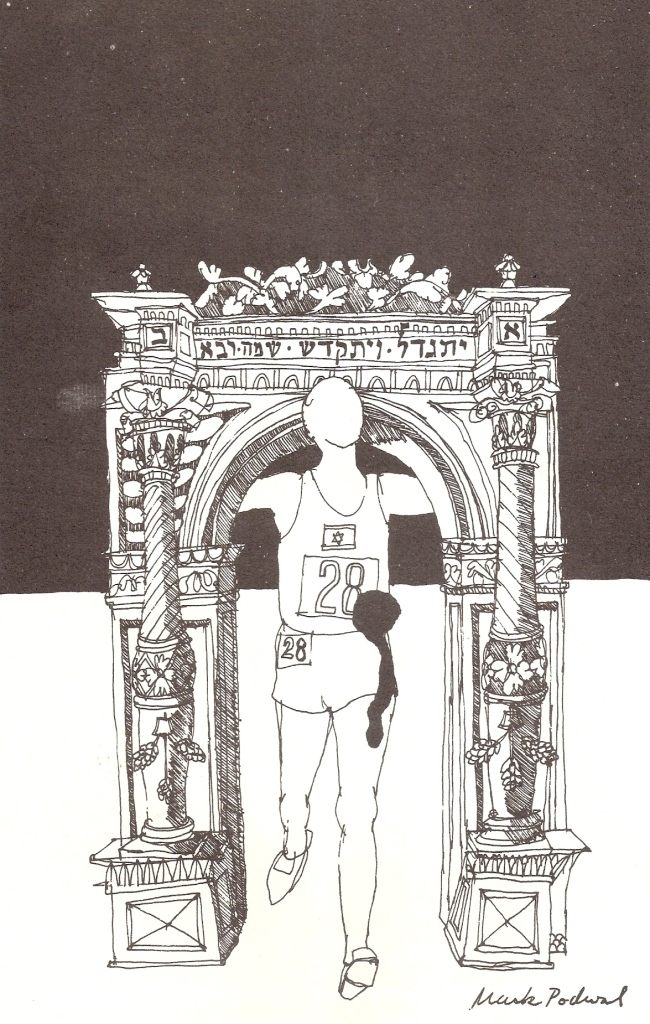
Mark Podwal's Munich Massacre in memory of Israeli athletes killed by Black September terrorists during 1972 Summer Olympics, published in the New York Times in 1972

Beyond his works on paper, Podwal's artistry has been employed in an array of diverse projects, including the design of a series of decorative plates for the Metropolitan Museum of Art: Passover Plate, Zodiac Platter (Met Bestseller), and Life Cycle (Met Bestseller). His work has been animated for public television in A Passover Seder with Elie Wiesel (Time Warner), engraved on a Congressional Gold Medal presented by President Reagan to Elie Wiesel, and woven into an Aubusson tapestry that adorned the ark in the main sanctuary of Congregation Emanu-El of the City of New York. Moreover, he designed sixteen kiln cast glass panels for the United Jewish Appeal Federation Headquarters in New York. Podwal collaborated with Academy Award-winning filmmaker Allan Miller on the documentary House of Life: The Old Jewish Cemetery in Prague, narrated by Claire Bloom. In 2009 and 2010, the film was broadcast on PBS.

In conjunction with the Anti-Defamation League, Podwal began The Jerusalem Sky Project, a program that fosters tolerance and awareness by bringing together young children from the Jewish, Islamic, and Christian communities. Participating religious schools study Podwal's Jerusalem Sky in their classrooms, and then encourage their students to illustrate their own depictions of Jerusalem. Amidst the learning, the children of each school write to or meet with their counterparts at a school of another faith and begin to learn about each other's religion and culture. After a few weeks, the program culminates with an exhibition of all of the drawings from each of the schools. At the opening of the exhibition, the children meet to enjoy each other's art and company. In a 2005 article called "Three Faiths, One Lesson", the New York Times covered the completion of the program at the Brooklyn Academy of Music in Brooklyn, NY. The project has since also been carried out in Los Angeles, CA, and Binghamton, NY. Regarding Jerusalem Sky, renowned children's author Maurice Sendak wrote, "All the earned and admiring praise – wondrous, luminous, magical – cannot catch the fierce bite, healthy spirit, and sheer joyousness of this superb book."

In 2011, Podwal received commissions to illustrate a new Passover Haggadah for the Central Conference of American Rabbis Press; to design new embroidered textiles for Prague's 700-year-old Altneuschul; to create a limited edition print for the Metropolitan Opera's production of Nabucco; and to design Hanukkah cards for the Metropolitan Museum and the Metropolitan Opera.

In 2014, the Terezin Ghetto Museum exhibited Podwal's cycle All This Has Come Upon Us, a series of 42 paintings and drawings created especially for that venue. The works, which span Jewish history from the destruction of the two temples in Jerusalem, through the history of anti-Semitism and persecution in Europe, culminating in the Holocaust, have been described by the artist as offering "a disturbing reminder of how Europe’s extensive history of 'Jew-hatred' laid the groundwork for Terezin and Auschwitz". The series has been published as a portfolio of archival pigment prints, which has been acquired by the United States Holocaust Memorial Museum, the Library of Congress, Yad Vashem, the Bodleian Library, the British Library, the Institute for Advanced Study, Harvard University, Yale University, Princeton University Library, Columbia University, Hebrew University, and the National Library of Israel, among many others.

In 2015, Mark Podwal was commissioned to design new textiles for the restored synagogue in the Czech city of Brno. At Prague's Klementinum, Podwal's series Mozart and Prague was exhibited along with Mozart's handwritten manuscripts.

In 2016, Glitterati Inc. published a 374-page monograph on his work, Reimagined: 45 Years of Jewish Art. Podwal's recent publications include his illustrations for Elie Wiesel's The Tale of a Niggun and Heinrich Heine's poems Hebrew Melodies, and his own A Collage of Customs and A Jewish Bestiary. Published in collaboration with the Babyn Yar Holocaust Memorial Center to commemorate the eightieth anniversary of the killings, An Atlas of Jewish Space, includes 139 of Podwal's images with a text by Holocaust scholar Robert Jan van Pelt.

== Affiliations ==
Podwal continued to pursue a parallel career as a physician and served on the faculty of New York University Grossman School of Medicine as Adjunct Associate Professor of Dermatology.

== Personal life and death ==
In 1977, Podwal married Ayalah Siev-or. They had two children.

Podwal died of cancer at his home in Harrison, New York, on September 13, 2024, at the age of 79.

Podwal's papers are stored at Columbia University

== Awards ==
1984: American Book Awards
1989: The Society of Newspaper Design Award
1993: Chevalier de l'Ordre des Arts et des Lettres de la Republique Francaise
1996: Officier de l'Ordre des Arts et des Lettres de la Republique Francaise
1998: National Jewish Book Award in the Children's Picture Book category for You Never Know: A Legend of the Lamed-vavniks. Text by Francine Prose
1999: Society of Illustrators Silver Medal
1999: Aesop Prize and Aesop Accolades American Folklore Society
2003: Doctor of Humane Letters Honoris Causa, Hebrew College, Newton Centre, MA
2009: Smithsonian Notable Book for Children
2010: New York University Grossman School of Medicine Alumnus Award Medicine in the Humanities
2011: Foundation for Jewish Culture Achievement Award
2012: Victoria and Albert Museum Print of the Month
2019: Gratias Agit Award Ministry of Foreign Affairs (Czech Republic)

== Films ==
2009: HOUSE OF LIFE: The Old Jewish Cemetery in Prague (Produced by Mark Podwal and Allan Miller)
2013: My Synagogue is in Prague: Picturing Mark Podwal (Produced by Czech Television)
2015: ALL THIS HAS COME UPON US: Mark Podwal's Art for Terezin (Produced by Czech Television)

== Publications ==
BOOKS BY THE ARTIST
1971: The Decline and Fall of the American Empire. Introduction by Peter Fonda. New York: Darien House
1978: A Book of Hebrew Letters. Philadelphia: The Jewish Publication Society
1982: Leonardo di Freud. Milan: Sperling and Kupfer Editori
1984: A Jewish Bestiary. Philadelphia: The Jewish Publication Society
1994: The Book of Tens. New York: Greenwillow Books
1995: Golem: A Giant Made of Mud. New York: Greenwillow Books
1998: The Menorah Story. New York: Greenwillow Books
2003: A Sweet Year. New York: Random House
2005: Jerusalem Sky. New York: Random House
2007: Doctored Drawings. New York: Bellevue Literary Press
2009: Built by Angels. New York: Houghton Mifflin Harcourt
2015: Jüdisches Bestiarium. Berlin: Hentrich & Hentrich
2016: Reimagined: 45 Years of Jewish Art. New York: Glitterati, Inc.
2018: Kaddish for Dąbrowa Białostocka. Amherst: Yiddish Book Center
2021: A Collage of Customs: Iconic Jewish Woodcuts Revised for the Twenty-First Century. Cincinnati: Hebrew Union College Press
2021: A Jewish Bestiary: Fabulous Creatures from Hebraic Legend and Lore. University Park: Penn State University Press

SELECTED ILLUSTRATED BOOKS
1972: Let My People Go: A Haggadah. Introduction by Theodore Bikel. Foreword by Abba Eban. New York: Macmillan
1972: The Book of Lamentations. New York: The National Council on Art in Jewish Life
1979: Klagsbrun, Francine. Voices of Wisdom. New York: Pantheon
1983: Schwartz, Howard. The Captive Soul of the Messiah. New York: Schocken Books
1985-1988: The Elie Wiesel Collection. Paris: The Bibliophile Library (Fourteen volumes)
1988: Wiesel, Elie. The Six Days of Destruction. Mahwah: Paulist Press
1993: Wiesel, Elie. A Passover Haggadah. New York: Simon and Schuster
1996: Klagsbrun, Francine. Jewish Days. New York: Farrar, Straus and Giroux
1996: Prose, Francine. Dybbuk: A Marriage Made in Heaven. New York: Greenwillow Books
1997: Prose, Francine. The Angel's Mistake: Stories of Chelm. New York: Greenwillow Books
1998: Prose, Francine. You Never Know: A Legend of the Lamed-vavniks. New York: Greenwillow Books
1998: Wiesel, Elie. Le Golem: Legende d’une legende. Paris: Bibliophane/Editions du Rocher
1999: Sobel, Ileene Smith. Moses and the Angels. Introduction by Elie Wiesel. New York: Delacorte Press
1999: Wiesel, Elie. King Solomon and His Magic Ring. New York: Greenwillow Books
2000: Prose, Francine. The Demons’ Mistake: A Story from Chelm. New York: Greenwillow Books
2007: Bloom, Harold. Fallen Angels. New Haven: Yale University Press
2012: Yoffie, Alan S. Sharing the Journey: The Haggadah for the Contemporary Family. New York: CCAR Press
2014: Mishkan T’filah for Youth. New York: CCAR Press
2014: Middleburgh, Charles and Goldstein, Andrew. A Jewish Book of Comfort. Norwich: Canterbury Press
2018: Mishkan HaNefesh for Youth. New York: CCAR Press
2019: Heine, Heinrich. Hebrew Melodies. University Park: Penn State University Press
2020: Elie Wiesel. The Tale of a Niggun. New York: Schocken Books
2021: Van Pelt, Robert Jan. How Beautiful Are Your Tents Jacob: An Atlas of Jewish Space. Zurich: Park Books

SOLO EXHIBITIONS CATALOGUES
1977: Observations. Berkeley: Judah L. Magnes Museum
1990: Ozick, Cynthia. Ink and Inkling: Mark Podwal Master of the True Line. South Hadley: Mount Holyoke College Art Museum
1997: Wiesel, Elie. Mark Podwal: Jewish Dreams. Prague: Jewish Museum
2006: Kabbalistics. New York: Forum Gallery
2012: Carlebach, Elisheva. Jewish Magic in the Art of Mark Podwal. Prague: Jewish Museum
2014: All this has come upon us. Terezin: Terezin Memorial
2020: Kaddish for Dąbrowa Białostocka. Terezin: Terezin Memorial
