= Benjamin Netanyahu's 2015 address to the United States Congress =

- Date: March 3, 2015; 11 years ago
- Time: 11 am (EST)
- Duration: 0:43:00
- Venue: United States Capitol
- Location: Washington D.C., United States
- Theme: Nuclear program of Iran
- Cause: Netanyahu's profound conviction that the evolving P5+1 deal with Iran endangers Israel's survival
- Motive: Rallying congressional support to oppose the deal and push for tougher sanctions
- Participants: Benjamin Netanyahu; John Boehner; Orrin Hatch
- Outcome: Iran nuclear deal Continued deterioration of the US-Israel relationship

On March 3, 2015, Israeli prime minister Benjamin Netanyahu delivered a speech before a joint session of the United States Congress. Netanyahu thus became the second foreign leader to address a joint session of the United States Congress on three occasions.

He warned that any nuclear agreement with Iran would pose a threat to the United States and to international security. Furthermore, he pointed out that Iranians have established control over four Arab capitals and maintain a substantial record of killing and abducting numerous Americans. This situation constitutes a grave concern even in the absence of nuclear weapons, and it would be vastly compounded if they were to acquire them. The speech focused primarily on Iran's nuclear program, which was the subject of ongoing negotiations between the United States and other world powers aimed at curbing Iran's nuclear activities in exchange for the easing of sanctions. Netanyahu strongly advocated against the ongoing negotiations, argue that a deal would "guarantee" that Iran would acquire nuclear weapons.

The administration and the Democratic Party sharply criticized the move and sought to prevent the extension of an invitation to a foreign leader intended to influence foreign policy, an area that primarily falls under the purview of the elected executive branch. The address ultimately heightened tensions between the United States and Israel.

== Background ==
Netanyahu began warning of the Iranian danger, which he associated especially with militant Islam. In parallel, he cautioned against Saddam Hussein's secular Arab nationalist regime in Iraq and North Korea during his periods in power. He repeatedly highlighted the risk of dangerous weapons reaching terrorist organizations or such groups obtaining advanced technology.

He had accepted an invitation extended on January 21, 2015, by House Speaker John Boehner. The Obama administration considered circumventing the executive branch to issue the invitation a gross breach of diplomatic protocol and an infringement on the administration's sovereign authority for the execution of foreign policy. The White House criticized the handling of the invitation, stating it was notified just shortly before the announcement was made. The incident was considered a departure from traditional diplomatic protocol.

External videos
- Remarks by Benjamin Netanyahu at the American Israel Public Affairs Committee (AIPAC) morning session, March 2, 2015, C-SPAN
- Netanyahu address to joint meeting of the U.S. Congress, March 3, 2015, C-SPAN

Israeli officials expressed strong concerns over the potential agreement, warning that a nuclear-armed Iran could trigger a regional arms race and arguing that the Iranian leadership was too irrational to be deterred by conventional notions of cost and benefit. Originally scheduled for February 11, the speech was postponed to March 3, two weeks before Israel's legislative elections. The rescheduling was reportedly intended to allow Prime Minister Netanyahu to attend the annual American Israel Public Affairs Committee (AIPAC) conference in Washington, D.C.

On February 21, the Likud party called on politicians to rise above personal and partisan concerns when a serious matter such as the Iranian nuclear program is on the table. On February 23, two leading Democratic senators, Richard Durbin and Dianne Feinstein, issued an invitation to Netanyahu to a private meeting with Democratic members of the Senate during his scheduled visit to Washington, warning that making US-Israeli relations a partisan issue could cause lasting impacts. Netanyahu turned down the invitation and replied by stating in a letter, 'While I appreciate your kind invitation to meet with Democratic senators, I believe that doing so at this time might complicate the misunderstanding in relation to the upcoming visit.'

== Speech ==
During his visit, Netanyahu did not meet with U.S. president Barack Obama. The Obama administration cited its long-standing policy of avoiding meetings with foreign leaders close to their national elections.

Netanyahu warned during his speech against considering the Iranian regime as a normal regime upon which reliance can be placed regarding the possibility of its obtaining the most terrifying weapons. He saw it as a regime that sanctifies death in order to achieve its purpose. Despite the forceful content of Prime Minister Netanyahu’s speech and the warm reception it received in the Congress, it did not alter the position of the Obama administration. Negotiations continued following the address, and on July 14, 2015, the Iranian nuclear agreement was announced.

According to sources, Obama ignored watching the speech and read it in written form.

== Reactions ==
In response to Netanyahu, President Obama stated that the speech had presented nothing new and reaffirmed his commitment to a diplomatic solution.'

The Representative for California, Nancy Pelosi, characterized the speech as 'an insult to American intelligence,' and during it, she shook her head, raised her eyes upward, and repeatedly commented in a loud voice.

The speech was boycotted by 58 Democrats, 8 from the Senate and 50 from the House. Joe Biden, vice president and President of the Senate, also did not attend.

== Aftermath ==
Obama received Netanyahu on November 9, 2015, more than a year after their last meeting.

In October 2026, Netanyahu noted that the speech established communication channels with Arab nations apprehensive about Iran's nuclear program, laying the groundwork for the Abraham Accords.
