= The Oath (Wiesel novel) =

1973 novel by Elie Wiesel

- First US edition (Random House, 1973)
- Author: Elie Wiesel
- Original title: Le serment de Kolvillàg
- Language: French
- Genre: Novel
- Publisher: Éditions du Seuil
- Publication date: 1973
- Publication place: France
- Media type: Print (hardcover)
- Pages: 253 pp
- ISBN: 2-02-001207-3
- OCLC: 246834038

The Oath (original title, French: Le serment de Kolvillàg) is a novel by Elie Wiesel. It tells the story of Azriel, the only surviving Jewish member of the small (fictionally named) Hungarian town of Kolvillàg after a pogrom perpetrated by neighboring Christians. Azriel carries the secret of Kolvillàg's destruction within him, forbidden to share his experiences. However, when Azriel meets a young man on the brink of suicide fifty years later, he realizes that he must pass on his secret to save the young man's life - yet, he is bound by his promise to the dead.

Le serment de Kolvillàg is a work told in fragments - the point of view changes from present-day Azriel, the Azriel of the past, the young man in the present, and the young man's past. It is unstructured to the point where it borders on Surrealism. Some of the themes of Le serment de Kolvillag include pogroms, death, old age, secrecy, silence, and modernity.
