= The Forgotten (Wiesel novel) =

1992 novel by Elie Wiesel

- First edition cover
- Author: Elie Wiesel
- Original title: L'oublié
- Language: French
- Publication date: 1989
- ISBN: 978-2-020-10667-2

The Forgotten (French: L'oublié "the forgotten one") is a novel by Elie Wiesel, published in 1992 in French. Summit Books published and English edition in 1992. It follows two men, Elhanan Rosenbaum, and his son Malkiel. Elhanan is suffering from an incurable disease that causes him to lose his memory slowly, something like amnesia. Elhanan tells Malkiel the story of his past before he forgets it all. Malkiel is compelled to go to the village in Romania where his father failed to stop a crime from occurring, a memory that continues to haunt him. Malkiel encounters the truth about his father and attempts to deal with the past.
