= Twilight (Wiesel novel) =

1988 novel by Elie Wiesel

- First US edition
- Author: Elie Wiesel
- Language: French
- Publisher: Summit Books (US)

Twilight, originally published in 1988 in French as Le crépuscule, au loin, is a novel by Elie Wiesel. The novel offers a fictionalized examination of a Holocaust survivor's pursuit to ascertain the fate of his wartime benefactor, while simultaneously addressing the broader existential questions surrounding his own survival.

== Plot ==
Twilight is the fictional story of a Holocaust survivor named Raphael Lipkin who is now a psychologist living in the United States of America. He visits a psychiatric ward called "The Mountain Clinic," where he interviews several psychiatric patients who believe themselves to be various characters from the Hebrew Bible. Interwoven with these accounts are Raphael's own memories of his life before and during the Holocaust, accounts of Raphael's brothers' lives during the Holocaust, and Raphael's memories of a Bricha agent named Pedro.

== Themes ==
Philosopher John K. Roth notes that Twilight continues Elie Wiesel’s literary trajectory from Night, deepening the exploration of moral and theological questions raised by the Holocaust survivor’s experience. Janet Hadda echoes this in the Los Angeles Times, writing that the novel succeeds in grappling with the major themes surrounding faith, the struggle between good and evil, and mortality.

Roth examined the recurring theme of friendship in Wiesel's fiction, pairing it with his earlier novel, The Town Beyond the Wall. In both books, a character named Pedro serves as a mentor figure to the protagonist, helping him through his despair. The Encyclopedia of Holocaust Literature also explored this theme, noting how Pedro works in both stories to challenge the protagonist's assumptions about truth.

Roth also observes that the protagonist's name, Raphael Lipkin, echoes Raphael Lemkin, the legal scholar who coined the term genocide.

== Reception ==
Contemporary reviewers, including a 1988 New York Times review, have characterized Twilight as a complex novel that engages with themes of memory, madness, and faith in the aftermath of the Holocaust, while noting its challenging and sometimes elusive narrative structure. A 1988 Los Angeles Times review observes that Twilight revisits Elie Wiesel’s central concerns; how to come to terms with the meaning of the Holocaust, the heroism of its victims, the viciousness of its persecutors, and the role of faith.
