= Marion Wiesel =

Austrian-American translator (1931–2025)

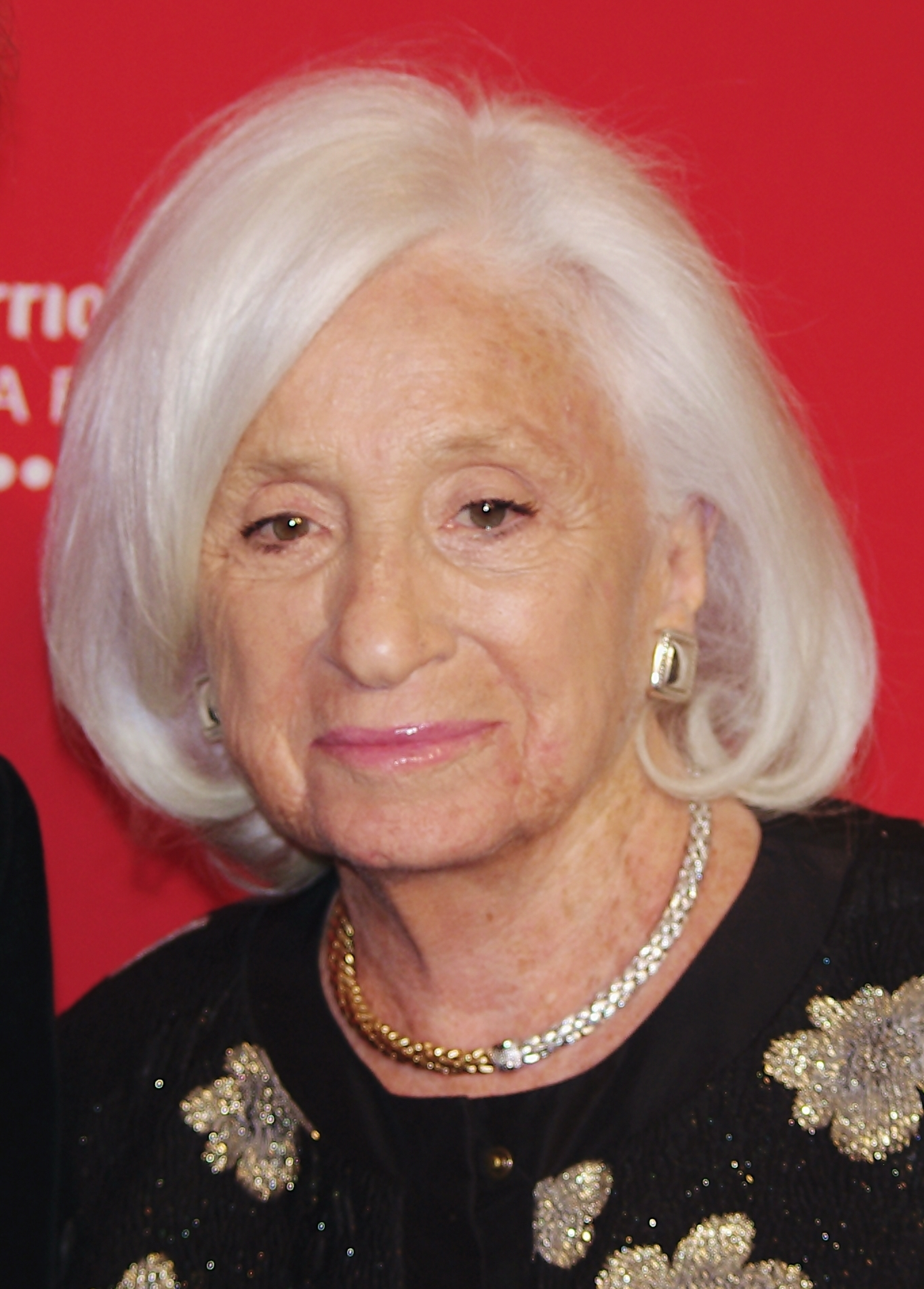
- Wiesel in 2012
- Born: Mary Renate Erster; January 27, 1931; Vienna, Austria
- Died: February 2, 2025 (aged 94); Greenwich, Connecticut, U.S.
- Other name: Marion Erster Rose
- Education: University of Miami
- Occupations: Translator; philanthropist
- Organization: Elie Wiesel Foundation for Humanity (co-founder)
- Known for: Translator of Night, by Elie Wiesel
- Spouses: F. Peter Rose (m. 1959; div. 1967) Elie Wiesel (m. 1969; died 2016)
- Children: 2, including Elisha Wiesel
- Awards: Commandeur des Arts et des Lettres (1987); French Legion of Honour – Knight, Officer, Commander 1991, 2000, 2007; Presidential Citizens Medal (2001); Theodor Herzl Award of the World Jewish Congress (2013)

Marion Rose Wiesel (born Mary Renate Erster; January 27, 1931 – February 2, 2025) was an Austrian-American Holocaust survivor, humanitarian, and translator. She was married to author and fellow Holocaust survivor Elie Wiesel, the 1986 Nobel Peace Prize laureate, 14 of whose books she translated from French into English. The most important of them was her translation of his book Night, based on his Holocaust experiences in the Auschwitz and Buchenwald concentration camps. In 2001, she was awarded the Presidential Citizens Medal by U.S. president Bill Clinton, and in 2007 she was named a Commandeur de la Legion d'Honneur by French president Jacques Chirac.

== Early life and education ==
Wiesel was born Mary Renate Erster in Vienna, Austria, on January 27, 1931. Her mother, Jetta (Hubel) Erster, chose the name Mary out of a love of Americana. Her father Emil owned a furniture store. She grew up in Vienna. At age seven, her family was forced to flee upon the 1938 Nazi annexation of Austria.

Her family first escaped to Belgium, where she began using the name Marion. While in Belgium, she was active in the Irgun youth movement. She and her family then fled to France, but after France was occupied by the Nazis in 1940, she and her family were interned in the Gurs internment camp, a French concentration camp. The family then escaped the internment camp and managed to flee to Marseille, France, where neighbors helped them avoid detection. In 1942, they were able to smuggle themselves into Basel, Switzerland, where her mother had a relative with Swiss citizenship, and they lived there until 1949. A passionate Zionist, she later said: "We didn't have [a state of Israel] in the 1940s when my family needed somewhere to go, and a strong state of Israel is the best guarantee in the world than there will never again be an Auschwitz to consume six million Jews."

The Erster family emigrated to the United States in 1949, with the help of HIAS, then known as the Hebrew Immigrant Aid Society. Marion attended the University of Miami but primarily lived in New York City, where she worked at a bra factory and as a saleswoman at Russeks department store on Fifth Avenue in Midtown Manhattan. She became a member of the National Association for the Advancement of Colored People (NAACP) in the 1950s, marched for civil rights in the American South, and spoke out against racial segregation in the South and discrimination in the U.S.

== Career ==
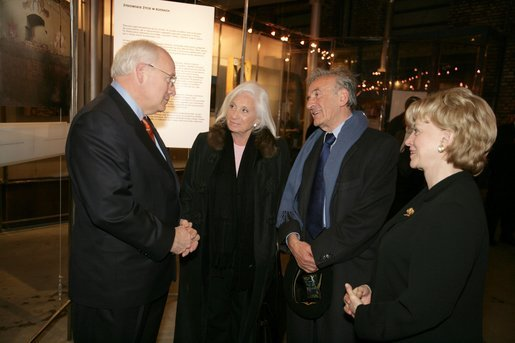
Marion and Elie Wiesel (center) meeting U.S. vice president Dick Cheney and Second Lady Lynne Cheney at Galicia Jewish Museum in 2005

Wiesel translated 14 of her husband's books from French into English. Her 2006 translation of his book Night, based on his Holocaust experiences in the concentration camps at Auschwitz and Buchenwald in 1944–45, sold three million copies after her translation. She also advised and coached her husband on his public appearances, including his frequent TV interviews.

She edited To Give Them Light (1993), a collection of Russian-American photographer Roman Vishniac's images of Eastern European Jewry before World War II. In addition, she wrote, narrated, and produced "Children of the Night" (1999), a documentary about the 1.3 million children who were murdered in the Holocaust. She also produced television programs, which included "The World of Elie Wiesel", "The Oslo Concert: A Tribute to Peace", and "A Passover Haggadah". She was a founding Chairman of the United States Holocaust Memorial Museum, which was established in 1993.

=== Philanthropy ===
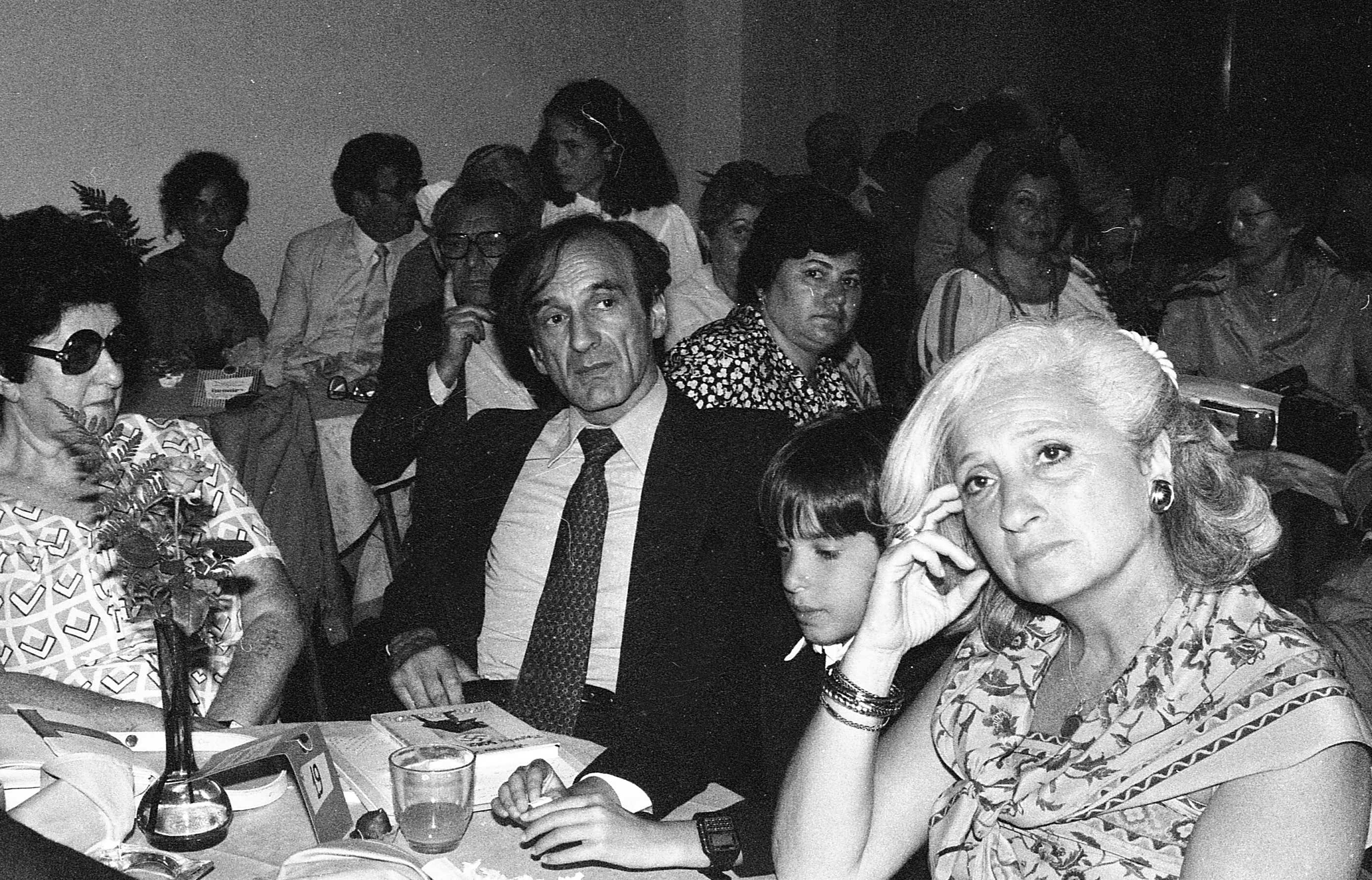
Wiesel at a 1981 convention of Bergen Belsen concentration camp Holocaust survivors

In 1986, the Wiesels used the money from Elie's Nobel Peace Prize that year to establish the Elie Wiesel Foundation for Humanity, which combats discrimination and injustice, promotes international dialogue, and teaches children to not be indifferent to the suffering of others. The Foundation became her full-time job, and she served as its Vice President.

As its Executive Director and Chairperson, she headed the Beit Tzipora Centers (named for Elie Wiesel's younger sister Tzipora, who was murdered at seven years of age in Auschwitz) in Israel, as part of the Foundation's work. They provide schooling and support to over 1,000 Israeli Jewish children of Ethiopian origin every year who have faced challenges integrating into Israeli society.

== Personal life ==
In the late 1950s, she married F. Peter Rose, a real estate businessman who was her first husband. The two of them had a daughter, Jennifer. The marriage later fell apart.

In the late-1960s, when she was known as Marion Erster Rose, she met Romanian-born American writer, professor, political activist, and fellow Holocaust survivor Elie Wiesel at a dinner party in Manhattan, in New York City. At the time, she was the mother of a young daughter and in the process of getting a divorce. She was fluent in five languages. Elie Wiesel wrote in his memoirs: "I wasn't sure what I found most striking about her. The delicacy of her features, the brilliance of her words, or the breadth of her knowledge of art, music and the theater." On their first date, they discussed French literature.

They married on April 2, 1969, in the Old City of Jerusalem in East Jerusalem. Author Joseph Berger wrote in the biography Elie Wiesel: Confronting the Silence (2023): "In the alignment of stars that helped make Wiesel the international icon he became, his marriage to Marion was among the most significant." They lived on the Upper West Side of Manhattan and spoke French at home.

On June 6, 1972, she gave birth to their son, Shlomo Elisha Wiesel (who goes by his middle name Elisha), naming him Shlomo after his paternal grandfather who was murdered in Buchenwald during the Holocaust, and Elisha meaning "God is salvation." Elie Wiesel wrote that their son's birth "will mark my existence forever. The little fellow in the arms of his mother will illuminate our life."

== Death ==
Marion Wiesel died at her home in Greenwich, Connecticut, on February 2, 2025, aged 94.

== Honors ==
In 1990, Wiesel received an honorary degree of Doctor of Humane Letters from Boston University. In 1995, she received an honorary doctorate degree from Bar Ilan University.

In 1987, France made her Commandeur des Arts et des Lettres. In 1991, French president François Mitterrand named her Chevalier de la Legion d'Honneur. In 2000, French president Jacques Chirac promoted her to Officier de la Legion d'Honneur, and in 2007 to Commandeur de la Legion d'Honneur.

In 2001, President Bill Clinton presented her with the Presidential Citizens Medal. The medal is awarded by a President of the United States in recognition of U.S. citizens who have performed exemplary deeds of service for the nation. As he handed her the medal, President Clinton said that he was awarding it to her for her "mission of hope against hate, of life against death, of good over evil", and noted that out of her experience of the Holocaust, she "summoned the courage to commit her life to teaching others, especially children, about the human cost of hatred, intolerance, and racism."

In 2013, she and Elie Wiesel received the Theodor Herzl Award of the World Jewish Congress for their lifetime achievement. The award was presented to them by former U.S. Secretary of State Hillary Rodham Clinton, who said that the Wiesels "played a pivotal part in bringing the Shoah into public consciousness, and had "worked to overcome indifference toward the suffering of oppressed and marginalized populations around the world: Soviet Jews, Miskito Indians, refugees from Cambodia, prisoners from the former Yugoslavia, victims of the genocide in Darfur."
