= Levo (disambiguation) =

Levo is one circular direction (levorotation or counterclockwise) of rotating plane-polarized light.

Levo may also refer to:

- Mikke Levo (born 1995), Finnish ice-hockey player
- Tapio Levo (born 1956), Finnish ice-hockey player
- Levo (Stresa), a parish of the Roman Catholic Diocese of Novara in the province of Verbano-Cusio-Ossola, Italy
- Liron Levo, Israeli actor in Dawn (2014 film)
