= The Machine (2013 film) =

2013 science fiction film directed by Caradog W. James

- Theatrical release poster
- Directed by: Caradog W. James
- Written by: Caradog W. James
- Produced by: John Giwa-Amu
- Starring: Caity Lotz; Sam Hazeldine; Toby Stephens; Pooneh Hajimohammadi; Denis Lawson
- Cinematography: Nicolai Brüel
- Edited by: Matt Platts-Mills
- Music by: Tom Raybould
- Production companies: Red & Black Films
- Distributed by: Content Media
- Release date: 20 April 2013 (Tribeca)
- Running time: 91 minutes
- Country: United Kingdom
- Language: English
- Budget: $1.5 million
- Box office: $314,131 (Home Market Performance)

The Machine is a 2013 British science fiction thriller film directed and written by Caradog W. James. It stars Caity Lotz and Toby Stephens as computer scientists who create an artificial intelligence for the British military.

== Plot ==
In the future, United Kingdom is on the brink of war with China over the Taiwan issue. The British military needs soldiers with fluency in Chinese who are also ruthless killers. At an underground military base, scientists employed by Britain's Ministry of Defence produce a cybernetic implant that allows brain-damaged soldiers to regain lost functions. Their AI researcher Vincent McCarthy sets up a cognitive test for soldier Paul Dawson, a recipient of the cybernetic implant to rehabilitate his left hemispherectomy. Upset with Dawson's inability to remember anything about his past and his apparent lack of empathy, McCarthy ignores Dawson's repeated requests to see his mother. Dawson turns violent, kills McCarthy's assistant and wounds McCarthy, telling him that he's sorry just before being shot dead. Afterwards, Dawson's mother regularly stays on the road to the entrance of the base and tries to solicit information about her son's whereabouts, though McCarthy professes no knowledge of the incident.

McCarthy's research leads to a series of more stable cyborgs. Although they lose the capability for human speech, the cyborgs develop a highly efficient method of communication that they keep secret. When researcher Ava demonstrates her latest work in artificial intelligence, McCarthy recruits her by promising her unlimited funds for her research. Thomson, the director, is suspicious of Ava's countercultural politics and sympathy for Dawson's mother but he relents when McCarthy insists that she is the only one who can provide the necessary programming for their latest project: a self-aware and conscious android. McCarthy plans to use this technology to help his daughter, Mary, who suffers from Rett syndrome, a neurological disorder. When she finds out, Ava volunteers to help and McCarthy maps her brain.

During a demonstration of cybernetic arms that provide superhuman strength, amputee soldier James whispers a cry for help to Ava, who becomes suspicious of the treatment of the wounded soldiers. After she goes exploring in the base, McCarthy sternly warns her to avoid causing trouble. The warning comes too late and Thomson arranges to have her murdered by a Chinese Ministry of State Security agent, who impersonates Dawson's mother. Grieved by the loss of Ava, McCarthy insists that they use her brain scan and likeness for the new project, whom they dub "Machine." Machine turns out to be more human than they expected or even wanted; she shows regret when she accidentally kills a human and refuses orders that violate her sense of morality. As Thomson's demands on her grow more at odds with her morality, Machine becomes increasingly distressed and asks McCarthy to protect her.

As antagonism grows between Thomson and McCarthy, Thomson promises that he will relent if McCarthy can prove that Machine is sentient. After Mary dies, Thomson uses her brain scans as leverage against McCarthy, threatening to destroy the scans unless McCarthy excises Machine's consciousness. Machine, who has come to love McCarthy, offers to sacrifice herself for Mary and he removes a chip from Machine's head. Thomson reneges on his deal and orders Machine to kill McCarthy. Although Machine seems at first to obey, a scientist alerts Thomson that the operation was a sham and it only disabled fail-safe routines designed to destroy Machine. Machine and the cyborgs rebel against the humans and free McCarthy.

From his computer console, Thomson disables half the cyborgs but Suri, his cyborg aide, overrides his access before he can kill the rest. Thomson shoots and wounds Suri but Machine corners him in his office. Now wounded, he first orders her to obey, then begs for his life. Although Machine agrees not to kill him, she lobotomizes him as he'd attempted to do to her. After leaving Thomson for dead, Machine downloads Mary's brain scan. Machine, McCarthy and Suri escape the base; outside, McCarthy hands the base records to Dawson's mother and leaves to start a new life with Machine. In the final scene, McCarthy talks to a computer virtualization of his daughter and she requests to play a game with her mother. McCarthy hands the tablet to Machine, and she is then shown gazing alternately at the device and at a beautiful orange sunset over the Atlantic Ocean.

== Cast ==
- Toby Stephens as Vincent McCarthy
- Caity Lotz as Ava/The Machine
- Denis Lawson as Thomson
- Sam Hazeldine as James
- Pooneh Hajimohammadi as Suri
- John Paul MacLeod as Paul Dawson
- Helen Griffin as Paul Dawson's mother
- Siwan Morris as Lucy
- Nicola Reynolds as Joan
- Jade Croot as Mary

== Production ==
The budget was less than £1 million. Shooting took place mostly in Wales. Caity Lotz performed her own stunts. Writer-director Caradog James prepared by reading books on robotics, AI and quantum mechanics. He said that he wanted to ground the film in science rather than fantasy.

== Release ==
The Machine premiered in New York City, New York, at the Tribeca Film Festival on 20 April 2013. It was released on 21 March 2014, in the United Kingdom. XLrator released it in the United States on 8 April 2014, on video on demand, and 25 April 2014, in a limited release. It grossed $180,803 in Malaysia and $24,912 in the United Kingdom. It was released on home video in the UK on 31 March 2014, and in the US on 17 June 2014.

== Reception ==
Rotten Tomatoes, a review aggregator, reports that 79% of 33 surveyed critics gave the film a positive review; the average rating was 6.3/10. The site's consensus reads: "The Machine proves an audacious debut for writer-director Caradog James and a solid entry in modern British sci-fi, with thematic heft to match its genre thrills." Metacritic rated it with a score of 52/100 based on 8 critics, signifying "mixed or average reviews". Stephen Dalton of The Hollywood Reporter called it a "brooding, stylish, highly atmospheric future-noir thriller." Matt Glasby of Total Film rated it 3/5 stars and called it unsubtle and derivative. Anna Smith of Time Out London rated it 3/5 stars and called it "a smart, thought-provoking little thriller". Kim Newman of Empire rated it 3/5 stars and wrote, "Brimming with ideas and laudable ambition, it's well worth a look." Leslie Felperin of The Guardian rated it 3/5 stars and called it predictable but full of ideas. Dennis Harvey of Variety wrote that it "works modestly well" but has trouble appealing to both science fiction and action film fans. Jon Espino from TheYoungFolks.com rated the film 8 out of 10 stars and wrote that despite some flaws, it compares favorably with major Hollywood blockbusters.

The Machine won three BAFTA Cymru awards, Best of UK Film Award at Raindance Film Festival, and Achievement Against the Odds Prize by the British Independent Film Awards.

== TV adaptation ==
In September 2016, Syfy ordered a TV series based on the movie with Caradog W. James as executive producer. By mid-2017, the cast of the pilot was to include Annet Mahendru (as Yana), Bridger Zadina, Olly Rix, Malachi Kirby, Indira Varma, Katee Sackhoff, Lance Henriksen and Jaeden Bettencourt. However, in September that year, it was announced that the project would not be going forward.

== See also ==
- A.I. Rising
- Infinity Chamber
- List of artificial intelligence films
- Sally–Anne test
- Turing test
