= Infinity Chamber =

2016 science fiction film directed by Travis Milloy

- Theatrical release poster
- Directed by: Travis Milloy
- Written by: Travis Milloy
- Produced by: Thomas Eberts
- Starring: Christopher Soren Kelly; Cassandra Clark; Cajardo Lindsey; Jesse D. Arrow
- Cinematography: Marty Mullin; Jason Nolte
- Edited by: Travis Milloy
- Music by: Jacob Yoffee
- Production companies: Latest Trick Productions; Milloy Films
- Distributed by: Alameda Entertainment
- Release date: 1 May 2016 (Fantastic Cinema Festival)
- Running time: 103 minutes
- Country: United States
- Language: English

Infinity Chamber (also known as Somnio) is a 2016 American science fiction thriller film directed and written by Travis Milloy. It stars Christopher Soren Kelly, Cassandra Clark, Cajardo Lindsey and Jesse D. Arrow who interact with an artificial intelligence machine that manages a futuristic automated detention facility.

It was released at the Fantastic Fest cinema festival in Austin, Texas in 2016 and won the Audience Award there.

== Plot ==
A man named Frank, who apparently sabotaged a government operation with a computer virus, is held in a futuristic automated detention facility that is overseen by an artificial intelligence (AI) computer named Howard, who appears as a round CCTV camera which descends from the ceiling. Another machine inside Frank's cell appears to be some kind of rotating disc and is able to manipulate his memories. Inside the facility, Frank relives recurrent dreams of the day before his detention: waking up with his dog, visiting his dying father on a life support machine, and particular focus on his final moments in a coffee shop with the owner Gabby, before he is shot from behind by two men.

Frank is able to change the events in each dream sequence, coming to realize that a scanner inside the coffee shop is what alerted authorities to his presence there. In one instance, Frank witnesses a large explosion, believed to be an attack from anti-government forces, which leads to a shutdown inside the facility when it loses power. Through the wall, Frank communicates with another detainee called Fletcher May, the leader of the anti-government resistance. They discuss possibilities for escaping the facility before Fletcher May ultimately decides to take his own life. Frank suddenly re-awakens in the facility, unsure what events are real and what is part of the dream manipulation. Frank imagines that he has succeeded in escaping the facility, emerging from an underground warehouse into a vast desert, passing an expanse of wind turbines, and eventually finding his way to a service station, only to reawaken inside the facility again.

Realizing that Frank is breaking down and that water and food supplies within the facility are becoming depleted, Howard eventually assists with Frank's escape, as he will not be able to keep Frank alive anyway. Exiting out of the underground prison into a snow-covered wasteland, Frank is rescued by two hikers. Robotic news broadcasters report that Frank was the sole survivor from a black site, abandoned by the previous government, as the wind turbines kept the facility functioning independently. Frank returns to the coffee shop and retrieves a flash drive which he had stashed behind a picture on the wall there, moments before he was apprehended. Gabby suddenly appears and Frank throws the flash drive in the trash. Frank is pleased to see Gabby, however she states that her name is actually Madeleine; the apron she was wearing that day had the name badge of an employee named Gabby who no longer works there. As Frank and Madeleine begin to talk, the shot pans up to reveal a CCTV camera in the ceiling, which looks exactly the same as Howard.

The infinity chamber is a plot device to carry forth the film-maker's message. Most of the film is actually repeated cycles happening inside Frank's mind, as he is sedated, and kept alive by Life Support Computers. This is one reason the timeline seems out of sequence, for example, Frank's hand is bandaged long before he executes the attack on H.O.W.A.R.D.

== Cast ==
- Christopher Soren Kelly as Frank Lerner
- Cassandra Clark as Gabby/Madeline
- Cajardo Lindsey as Fletcher May
- Jesse D. Arrow as H.O.W.A.R.D.

== Reception ==
Infinity Chamber won the Audience Award at the Fantastic Cinema Festival in 2016, and was a nominee at the Festival for Best Feature Film; the film was also a nominee for Best Feature Director at the Other Worlds Austin SciFi Film Festival in 2016.

According to film reviewer Greg Wheeler, "Infinity Chamber is an interestingly crafted futuristic sci-fi that manages ... to form a decent cerebral science fiction flick," although, the reviewer notes, the ending could have been better. David Duprey is generally favorably impressed and writes, "Infinity Chamber [is] a complex, ingenious Indie gem with plenty of tricks up its sleeve." and comments that the film is "Highly Recommended". Michael Rechtshaggen, film reviewer for The Los Angeles Times, considers the film to be "a claustrophobic, dystopian sci-fi thriller that plays ... mind games to ponderous effect" but, in the end, considers the film to be a bit repetitious and long. Infinity Chamber, according to reviewer Dave Taylor, "is okay as a lower budget sci-fi film" and is "Worth a watch".

== See also ==
- A.I. Artificial Intelligence – 2001 film by Steven Spielberg
- A.I. Rising – 2018 film directed by Lazar Bodroža
- Artificial intelligence – Intelligence of machines
- List of artificial intelligence films
- The Machine – 2013 science fiction film directed by Caradog W. James
- 2001: A Space Odyssey – 1968 film by Stanley Kubrick
- Fantastic Fest
