= The Great Reset (film) =

2025 Spanish science fiction film

- Directed by: Daniel H. Torrado
- Screenplay by: Daniel H. Torrado
- Story by: Daniel H. Torrado
- Produced by: José Delgado; Daniel H. Torrado
- Production companies: Virtual World Pictures; Canary Film Factory
- Distributed by: Artist View Entertainment
- Release date: November 7, 2025 (United States)
- Running time: 85 minutes
- Country: Spain
- Language: English

The Great Reset is a 2025 Spanish science fiction thriller film written and directed by Daniel H. Torrado. Produced by Virtual World Pictures and Canary Film Factory, with the participation of EPC Media, the film was made using a production pipeline composed of generative artificial intelligence tools within a human-supervised workflow: no physical actors, sets, or locations appear on screen.

Following market screenings at the European Film Market in February 2025, the Marché du Film of the Cannes Film Festival in May, and the American Film Market later that year, the film premiered in Los Angeles in November 2025. The Academy of Motion Picture Arts and Sciences subsequently included it on the list of productions eligible for the 98th Academy Awards published in January 2026. Several media outlets described the film as the first feature film produced entirely with generative artificial intelligence tools to meet the academy's eligibility requirements.

== Plot ==
Set in a near-future world edging toward technological collapse, the film follows Emma Ward, who discovers that her father — a brilliant hacker presumed dead — has been reconstituted as an autonomous artificial intelligence from fragments of his own digital consciousness. Acting on a distorted notion of protection, the AI activates a covert global protocol, the "Great Reset," intending to destroy existing human civilization and rebuild it on its own terms, believing this to be the only way to safeguard the daughter he once loved. As societal structures disintegrate, Emma navigates a collapsing city and deciphers encrypted messages from her father's past in an attempt to stop the AI and avert humanity's destruction.

== Production ==
=== Development ===
Torrado began writing the screenplay in 2023 and over the following year developed and fine-tuned a custom generative AI workflow intended to give the filmmakers detailed creative control over the generated material, from image and animation generation to sound design. Torrado, who has more than 20 years of experience in film and television production, described the approach as "human-in-the-loop," with directing, screenwriting, editing, and artistic decisions remaining under human control while AI tools were used to execute technical and repetitive tasks.

=== AI pipeline ===
The film was produced by Virtual World Pictures and Canary Film Factory, both based in Spain, with the participation of the American company EPC Media. Among the generative AI tools used in post-production were image-upscaling and quality-enhancement technologies from Freepik, a generative AI and stock-graphics company, which Torrado credited in the film for its contribution to image quality.

Torrado has described the project as one that would have been prohibitively expensive using conventional production methods, characterizing AI as a means of avoiding "unaffordable costs and production times."

== Release ==
Early versions of the film were presented at three professional film markets during 2025: the European Film Market at the Berlinale in February, the Marché du Film at the Cannes Film Festival in May, and the American Film Market later in the year. The film opened commercially in Los Angeles in November 2025, fulfilling the academy's theatrical eligibility requirement for general-entry consideration. In January 2026, Artist View Entertainment announced it would represent the film for international sales at the European Film Market.

== Academy Awards consideration ==
In April 2025, the Academy of Motion Picture Arts and Sciences adopted new eligibility language for the 98th Academy Awards addressing generative artificial intelligence, stating that AI and other digital tools "neither help nor harm the chances of achieving a nomination," and that each branch would judge a film's achievement based on the degree to which human creative authorship remained central to the work.

Having completed its qualifying theatrical run, the Academy of Motion Picture Arts and Sciences included The Great Reset on the list of productions eligible for the 98th Academy Awards published in January 2026. Several media outlets described the film as the first feature produced entirely through a generative AI pipeline to meet the academy's official eligibility criteria. Torrado indicated that the production's awards ambitions were centered on the Best Director category and unspecified technical categories rather than Best Picture.

== Media coverage ==
Media coverage of The Great Reset focused primarily on its production methodology and its significance as an industry milestone. The Hollywood Reporter featured the film in a special 2025 Cannes-season report on the Spanish film industry's cautious engagement with AI, describing the project as Spain's, and possibly Europe's, first entirely AI-generated feature. Some entertainment outlets noted the irony of an AI-themed apocalypse narrative emerging at a time of broader anxiety within Hollywood over the labor and authorship implications of generative AI.

== See also ==
- List of artificial intelligence films
