= Dawn (Wiesel novel) =

1961 novel by Elie Wiesel

- First US edition
- Author: Elie Wiesel
- Subject: British Mandate of Palestine paramilitary group
- Genre: fiction
- Publisher: Les Editions de Seuil (France); Hill and Wang (US); MacGibbon & Kee (UK)
- Publication date: 1961
- Pages: 81
- Preceded by: Night (1960)
- Followed by: Day (1962)

Dawn is a novel by Elie Wiesel, published in 1961. It is the second in a trilogy — Night, Dawn, and Day — describing Wiesel's experiences and thoughts during and after the Holocaust.

Unlike Night, Dawn is a work of fiction. It tells the story of Elisha, a Holocaust survivor. After the war, Elisha moves to the British Mandate of Palestine and joins the Irgun (in the book known as the Movement), a paramilitary group determined to oust the British from the area. One night, he is told he must execute a British officer at dawn. The novel covers his internal struggle leading up to the execution, looking back on his life and those that have affected it.

== Synopsis ==
The book starts out in Paris with Elisha, the main character, trying to start over from his childhood at Buchenwald Concentration Camp. A man named Gad stops over at Elisha's house to ask if he will give him his future. Gad wants him to join the Movement. Elisha agrees and moves to Palestine to help fight with the Movement.

The Movement is a group of terrorists made up of Jews who are fighting the British for control over Palestine. Elisha is sent to a training camp for six weeks to learn how to be a freedom fighter. After Elisha is trained, he is sent out on missions to kill the British in large quantities. Everyone within the Movement goes on separate assignments. While on one mission, a "brother" named David ben Moshe was injured and captured.

The British took David ben Moshe as a prisoner of war and sentenced him to be executed at dawn. In retaliation, the Movement took hostage a British captain named John Dawson. The Movement threatened that if David Ben Moshe is executed, then they will kill John Dawson. However, if the British were to let Moshe go, then the people of the Movement would let Dawson go as well. The Old Man, the leader of the Movement, ordered Elisha to execute John Dawson at dawn if David ben Moshe was put to death.

John Dawson is kept in a house with a jail in the basement. Elisha and a group of "brothers" from the Movement, sat and waited for the confirmation that Moshe was to be hanged. The radio confirmed that night the execution of David ben Moshe is to happen at dawn. When the announcement was finished, "The Voice of Freedom" came on. This underground station is used by the Movement to get information out to the people. The "Voice of Freedom" is a woman named Ilana, who happens to be in love with Gad. Later in the night when the broadcast is finished, Ilana came to the house where John Dawson was being kept. The group of people at the house were sitting and talking about how they have escaped death and about Dawson's execution.

As the talking continued they decide that Dawson may be hungry. However, Elisha says he is not, asking how can a man be hungry when he knows he is about to die. Gad still takes a plate of food to Dawson and he ends up eating it all. While Elisha is waiting for Gad to return, he saw the poltergeists of people from his past. For example, a younger version of himself, his parents, the beggar, and his master, who is a Rabbi. The beggar is a man that taught him how to see the night and that Elisha thinks is a prophet, and the master is someone that Elisha looked up to as a role model. At this moment, Elisha was having an internal battle within himself about killing John Dawson and whether or not he wanted to go see him. When Gad comes back up from feeding Dawson and tells Elisha that he ate it all, Elisha is so shocked and confused that he decided that he is going to talk to him before he is to kill him, as he did not want to kill a complete stranger. Elisha wants to talk to Dawson by himself; Gad walked over to Elisha and handed him a sleek black revolver to take with him.

When Elisha sees Dawson, he is surprised by how tall he appeared to be and how handsome he is. The only thing he knew about John Dawson was that he is going to die; the first thing John Dawson said to Elisha "What time is it?" (206). Elisha knew what he was talking about right away and answered that it is not yet, only around four-something in the morning. Then, Dawson asked for Elisha's name, and Elisha asked for a funny story. Dawson did not give one, but he did talk about his son. Before he was to be executed, he asked for a piece of paper from Elisha and wrote a letter to his son. Elisha said he would put it in the post that day. As the time came for Dawson to die, he tried to tell his funny story, but it was too late at that point. Elisha shot as Dawson was saying his name. Once his job was done, Elisha walked back upstairs, knowing he was a changed man.

== Character list ==
- David ben Moshe – David ben Moshe was part of the Zionist Movement. He was captured by the Englishmen. He was sentenced to hanging by the Englishmen for being part of the Movement.
- John Dawson – John Dawson was an English army officer. He was caught for reprisal by the Zionist Movement. He was then held hostage by the Movement and was to be executed by Elisha. Elisha ends up shooting Dawson.
- Joab – Joab is part of the Zionist movement. He flees to an insane asylum to hide from his neighbor, who is against the Movement. Joab pretends to be sick so the police won't take him, but they take him anyway.
- Gideon – Gideon was part of the Zionist Movement. He is a very religious person. He survived torture and imprisonment because he thought God was with him. He believed that he would make it alive if God was with him.
- Ghosts – Ghosts appeared throughout the book. They are all ghosts of his past who did not make it through the Holocaust. One significant ghost is the ghost of him as a child. This ghost represents how he died as a child and how his childhood is gone, and he can no longer go back to it.
- Elisha – 18-year-old Holocaust survivor who is recruited by Gad to go to Palestine and join the Movement. He is assigned to assassinate John Dawson at dawn.
- Gad – Man who recruited Elisha to the Zionist movement. He is Ilana's boyfriend.
- Ilana – Gad's girlfriend. She is the Voice of Freedom on the radio.
- The Old Man – The leader of the Movement. He orders the kidnapping of John Dawson and orders Elisha to kill him at dawn.

== Religion ==
Numerous times throughout the book religion plays a vital role in Elisha's thoughts. Religion is the primary motivator for all of Elisha's actions. He lives, dies and kills for his religion, always using this to justify his borderline terrorist actions. Religion serves as an excuse for young freedom fighting Elisha.

Characters with religious implications

- Gad - Represents Meshulah, a rabbinical emissary sent to deliver messages of fate. Elisha directly compares Gad to Meshulah. Gad delivers a message to Elisha telling him of the ongoing war in Palestine, and his intents to recruit Elisha. Sacrificing his future, Elisha surrenders to his fate.
- Elisha - Named after Jewish prophet Elisha who appears in the Old Testament's Book of Kings, and in the New Testament as well.
- Beggar - Hassidic Literature states how beggars may be prophet Elijah in disguise, visiting earth to offer men who treat him well eternal life. Not only could he be prophet Elijah but the Angel of Death, who may take a man's life or soul. Consequently, to these beliefs, Elisha feels obligated to be kind towards the beggar.
- Messenger of God.

== Themes and motifs ==
Wiesel's novel, Dawn, has powerful themes and motifs expressed throughout. One example of a reoccurring theme is past vs. present. In the past, the Jews were held in concentration camps and now that the war has ended, the Jews are trying to regain their rights. The Jews go from one end of the spectrum to the complete opposite end before and after World War II. Another important theme is becoming someone you hate. Once joining the movement, he takes the place of the people he hated, the Nazis. Before, the Nazis were committing acts of hate, but now Elisha and the movement are.

The two main motifs for Dawn are death and internal struggle. In war, death surrounds everyone, there is no escaping it. Elisha and the movement's objective was to, "...kill the greatest number of soldiers possible. It was that simple." The death of John Dawson and David B. Moshe played a significant role in the writing of Dawn. Internal struggle is seen many times during the story. Elisha, being the main character of the book, has the most internal struggle of anyone. He always hears a child crying, even though no one is actually crying. This suggests that Elisha is that child who wants to cry but cannot. Elisha is given the job of executing John Dawson, but he debates whether he should get to know him before killing him. Gad tells Elisha, "Don't torture yourself, this is war." This quote implies that Elisha is making his task more of an issue than it's supposed to be, according to Gad.

== Film adaptations ==
Elie Wiesel's novel L'Aube (Dawn) was adapted twice to the screen:

- 1985 by Miklós Jancsó. The French-Hungarian coproduction Dawn is starring Michael York, Philippe Léotard and Christine Boisson.
- 2014 by Romed Wyder. The Swiss-UK-German-Israeli coproduction Dawn starring Jason Isaacs, Joel Basman and Sarah Adler.

== Symbols ==
There are a number of symbols seen in Dawn. One of the first symbols that readers see is night. The beggar describes to Elisha that night has a face, and explains that if you can see a face, you know that night has succeeded day. Due to Gad's explanation of night, the night or darkness represents purity of thought. Throughout the novella, Elisha continues to see different faces in his window during the night. The faces that Elisha initially saw were people from his past who have died, until the end when Elisha sees his own face. The eyes/faces that Elisha see represent death.

The next symbol is Elisha's name, which alludes to the prophet Elisha, mentioned in the Old Testament's Book of Kings. Lastly, dawn is a symbol which represents death. Dawn is generally the time that the Jews and hostages get executed, so throughout the book, the repetition of Elisha mentioning dawn refers to the death of Jews and hostages.
