= Besterman =

Besterman is a surname. Notable people with the surname include:

- Doug Besterman (born 1965), American orchestrator, musical arranger, and music producer
- Kirsty Besterman (born 1980), British actress
- Theodore Besterman (1904–1976), Polish-born British parapsychologist and translator
