= Jade Croot =

Welsh actress

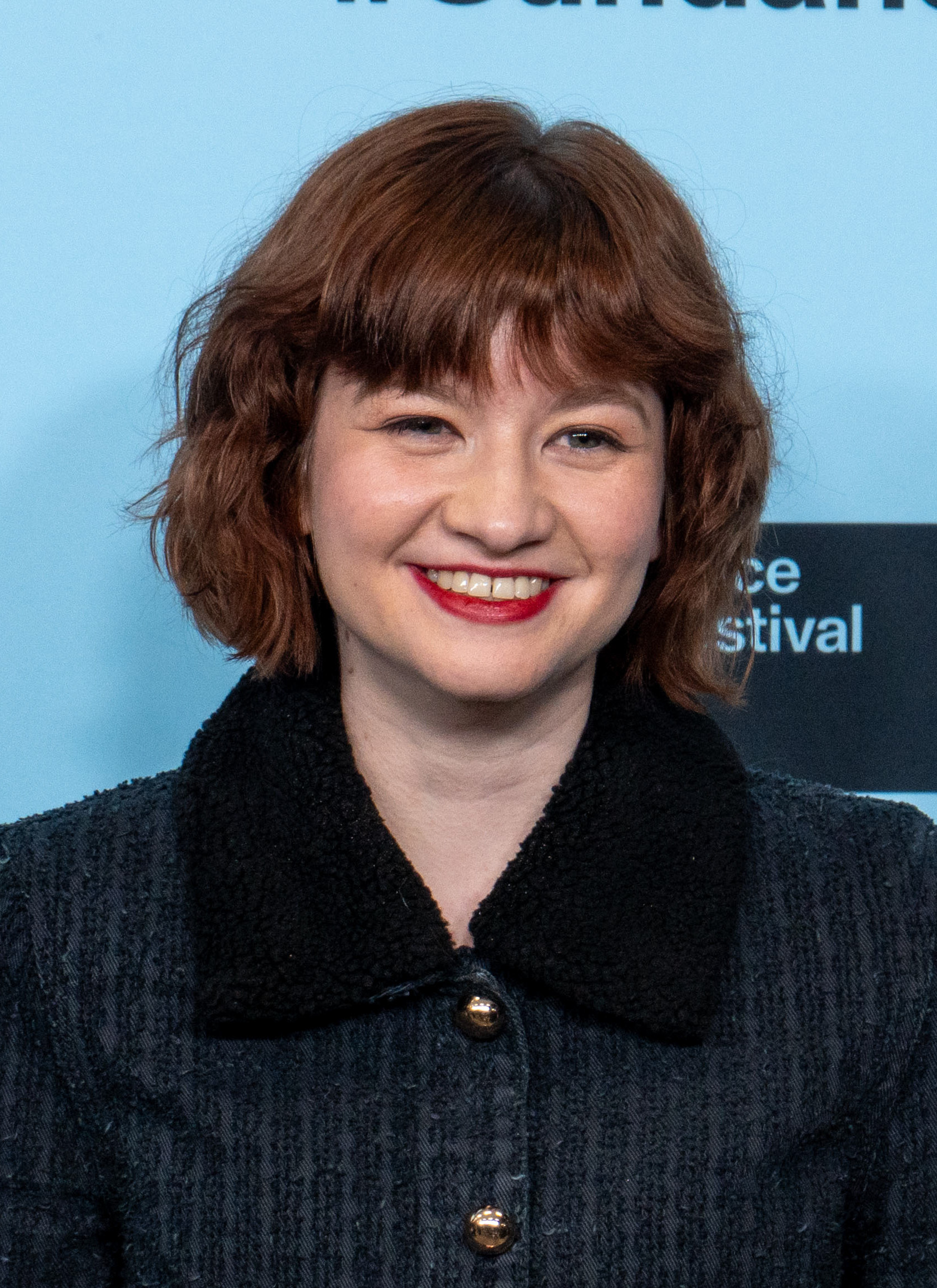
- Croot in 2025
- Born: 11 January 1999 (age 27); Merthyr Tydfil, South Wales Valleys, Wales
- Education: Merthyr Tydfil College
- Occupation: Actress
- Years active: 2013-present
- Television: The Accident

Jade Croot (born 11 January 1999) is a Welsh stage, television and film actress, and former child actress. Her film roles include Rabbit Trap (2025) and The Death of Robin Hood (2026).

== Biography ==
From Merthyr Tydfil in Wales, she was educated at Merthyr College and attended Mark Jermin Stage School from the age of 12 years-old. At 16, she joined the Royal Shakespeare Company. In 2013, she could be seen in an early film role in science-fiction film The Machine. In 2019, she had a television role as Leona Bevan in The Accident alongside Sarah Lancashire and Mark Lewis Jones for Channel 4. That year, Croot played the role of Princess Adda in the Netflix series The Witcher.

Her television and film roles include Pauline Floyd in true-crime series Steeltown Murders for BBC One in 2023, as well as The Serpent Queen, 2024 biblical epic Mary, and 2025 action romance film Sacrifice.

She appeared in a leading role as The Child alongside Dev Patel and Rosy McEwen in 2025 folk horror film Rabbit Trap. For her role in the film she was long-listed for the British Independent Film Award for Breakthrough Performance. She was named a Screen International Star of Tomorrow in 2025. She had scenes as the character Wainwright alongside Hugh Jackman in period action film The Death of Robin Hood (2026).

== Partial filmography ==
Year	Title	Role	Notes
2013	The Machine	Mary	Film
2019	The Accident	Leona Bevan	4 episodes
2019	The Witcher	Princess Adda	
2023	Steeltown Murders	Pauline Floyd	3 episodes
2023	The Serpent Queen	Edith	4 episodes
2024	Mary	Sarah	Film
2025	Rabbit Trap	The Child	Film
2025	Sacrifice	Louise	Film
2026	The Death of Robin Hood	Wainwright	Film
