= The Man in My Basement =

2025 thriller film

- Theatrical release poster
- Directed by: Nadia Latif
- Written by: Walter Mosley; Nadia Latif
- Based on: The Man In My Basement by Walter Mosley
- Produced by: Diane Houslin; John Giwa-Amu; Dave Bishop; Len Rowles
- Starring: Corey Hawkins; Willem Dafoe; Anna Diop; Tamara Lawrance
- Cinematography: Ula Pontikos
- Edited by: Mark Towns
- Music by: Robert Aiki Aubrey Lowe
- Production companies: Andscape; B.O.B. Filmhouse; Good Gate Media; Protagonist Pictures
- Distributed by: Hulu
- Release dates: September 5, 2025 (TIFF); September 12, 2025 (United States)
- Running time: 115 minutes
- Countries: United States; United Kingdom
- Language: English

The Man in My Basement is a 2025 thriller film directed by Nadia Latif (in her feature directorial debut) and written by Latif and Walter Mosley, based on Mosley's 2004 novel. It stars Corey Hawkins, Willem Dafoe, Anna Diop and Tamara Lawrance.

The film premiered at the 2025 Toronto International Film Festival, and was released in selected theaters on September 12, 2025.

== Premise ==
Charles Blakey, an African American man living in Sag Harbor, is stuck in a rut, out of luck, and about to lose his ancestral home when a peculiar white businessman offers to rent his basement for 65 days.

== Cast ==
- Willem Dafoe as Anniston Bennet
- Corey Hawkins as Charles Blakey
- Anna Diop as Narciss Gully
- Tamara Lawrance as Bethany

== Production ==
In March 2022, it was announced that a film adaptation of Walter Mosley's 2004 novel The Man in My Basement was in development, with Nadia Latif making her directorial debut as well as writing the screenplay. Jonathan Majors had been cast as Charles Blakey and that he would also serve as an executive producer. In August 2022, Willem Dafoe joined the cast of the film portraying Anniston Bennet.

In 2023, following Majors's arrest in March 2023 and subsequent assault allegations, he was fired from the film. In January 2024, Corey Hawkins was cast to replace Majors. In February, Anna Diop joined the cast of the film playing Narciss Gully.

=== Filming ===
Principal photography began on January 30, 2024, in Cardiff, Wales.

== Reception ==
On the review aggregator website Rotten Tomatoes, 40% of 47 critics' reviews are positive, with an average rating of 5.8/10. Metacritic, which uses a weighted average, assigned the film a score of 51 out of 100, based on 14 critics, indicating "mixed or average" reviews.
