= Night (memoir) =

1960 memoir by Elie Wiesel

- Cover of the first edition
- Author: Elie Wiesel
- Original title: Un di velt hot geshvign
- Translator: Stella Rodway for Hill & Wang, 1960; Marion Wiesel for Hill & Wang/Oprah Book Club, 2006
- Language: Yiddish
- Series: Dos poylishe yidntum
- Publisher: Tzentral Varband für Polishe Yidn in Argentina
- Publication date: 1956
- Publication place: Argentina
- English publication date: 1960
- Pages: 245
- Followed by: Dawn (1961)

Night (Yiddish: און די װעלט האט געשװיגן, romanized: Un di velt hot geshvign, lit. 'And the World Remained Silent') is a 1956 memoir by Elie Wiesel based on his Holocaust experiences with his father in the Nazi concentration camps at Auschwitz and Buchenwald in 1944–1945, toward the end of the Second World War in Europe. It remains unclear how much of Night is memoir. Wiesel called it his deposition, but scholars have had difficulty approaching it as an unvarnished account.

Wiesel writes about his loss of faith and increasing disgust with humanity, recounting his experiences from the Nazi-established ghetto in his hometown of Sighet, Romania, to his migration through multiple concentration camps. The typical parent–child relationship is inverted as his father dwindled in the camps to a helpless state while Wiesel himself became his teenaged caregiver. His father died in January 1945, taken to the crematory after deteriorating from dysentery and a beating while Wiesel lay silently on the bunk above him for fear of being beaten too. The memoir ends shortly after the United States Army liberated Buchenwald in April 1945.

After the war, Wiesel moved to Paris and in 1954 completed an 862-page manuscript in Yiddish about his experiences, which was edited into a 245-page book which was published in Argentina in 1956 as Un di velt hot geshvign. The novelist François Mauriac helped him find a French publisher. Les Éditions de Minuit published 178 pages, edited by Jérôme Lindon, as the fragmented narrative La Nuit in 1958, and in 1960 Hill & Wang in New York published a 116-page translation of the French book as Night.

The Night version has been translated into 30 languages and ranks as one of the cornerstones of Holocaust literature. The literary critic Ruth Franklin writes that the pruning of the text from Yiddish to French transformed an angry historical account into a work of art. Night is the first in a trilogy—Night, Dawn, Day—marking Wiesel's transition during and after the Holocaust from darkness to light, according to the Jewish tradition of beginning a new day at nightfall. "In Night," he said, "I wanted to show the end, the finality of the event. Everything came to an end—man, history, literature, religion, God. There was nothing left. And yet we begin again with night."

== Background ==
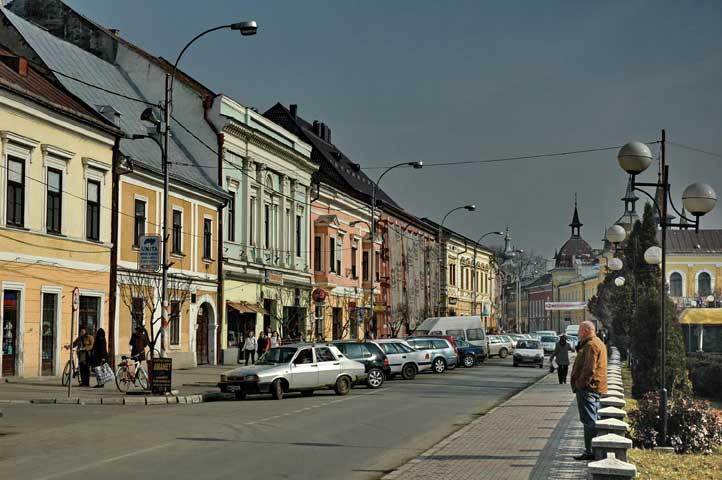
Sighet, Transylvania, now Sighetu Marmației, Romania, 2009

Elie Wiesel was born on 30 September 1928 in Sighet, a town in the Carpathian mountains of northern Transylvania (now Romania), to Chlomo Wiesel, a shopkeeper, and his wife, Sarah (née Feig). The family lived in a community of 10,000–20,000 mostly Orthodox Jews. Northern Transylvania had been annexed by Hungary in 1940, and restrictions on Jews were already in place, but the period Wiesel discusses at the beginning of the book, 1941–1943, was a relatively calm one for the Jewish population.

That changed at midnight on Saturday, 18 March 1944, with the invasion of Hungary by Nazi Germany, and the arrival in Budapest of SS-Obersturmbannführer Adolf Eichmann to oversee the deportation of the country's Jews to the Auschwitz concentration camp in German-occupied Poland. From 5 April, Jews over the age of six had to wear a 10 × 10 cm (3.8 × 3.8 in) yellow badge on the upper-left side of their coats or jackets. Jews had to declare the value of their property, and were forbidden from moving home, travelling, owning cars or radios, listening to foreign radio stations, or using the telephone. Jewish authors could no longer be published, their books were removed from libraries, and Jewish civil servants, journalists and lawyers were sacked.

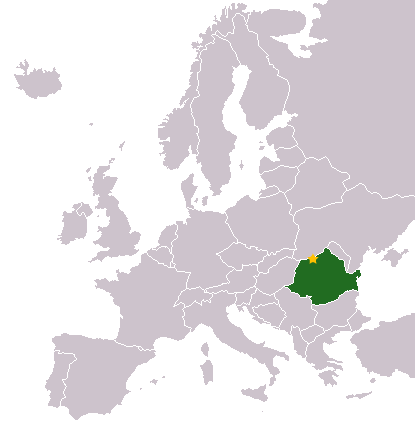
Sighetu Marmației, Romania

As the Allies prepared for the liberation of Europe, the mass deportations began at a rate of four trains a day from Hungary to Auschwitz, each train carrying around 3,000 people. Between 15 May and 8 July 1944, 437,402 Hungarian Jews are recorded as having been sent there on 147 trains, most gassed on arrival. The transports comprised most of the Jewish population outside Budapest, the Hungarian capital.

Between 16 May and 27 June, 131,641 Jews were deported from northern Transylvania. Wiesel, his parents and sisters—older sisters Hilda and Beatrice and seven-year-old Tzipora—were among them. On arrival Jews were "selected" for the death or forced labour; to be sent to the left meant work, to the right, the gas chamber. Sarah and Tzipora were sent to the gas chamber. Hilda and Beatrice survived, separated from the rest of the family. Wiesel and Chlomo managed to stay together, surviving forced labour and a death march to another concentration camp, Buchenwald, near Weimar. Chlomo died there in January 1945, three months before the 6th Armored Division of the United States Army arrived to liberate the camp.

== Synopsis ==
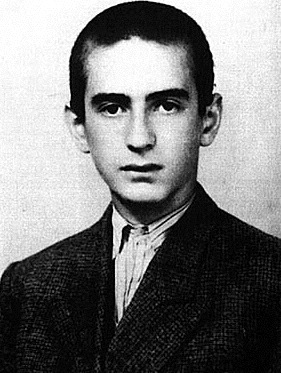
Elie Wiesel, c. 1943, aged 15

Night opens in Sighet in 1941. The book's narrator is Eliezer, an Orthodox Jewish teenager who studies the Talmud by day, and by night "weep[s] over the destruction of the Temple". To the disapproval of his father, Eliezer spends time discussing the Kabbalah with Moshe (Note: Note: "Moshe" is from the original 1960 English translation. The name is written as "Moché-le-Bedeau" in La Nuit (1958); "Moshe" in Night (1960, 1982); "Moshe", "Moishele" and "Moishe" in All Rivers Run to the Sea (1995, 2010); "Moshe" in Elie Wiesel: Conversations (2002); and "Moishe" in Night (2006).) the Beadle, caretaker of the Hasidic shtiebel (house of prayer).

In June 1941 the Hungarian government expelled Jews unable to prove their citizenship. Moshe is crammed onto a cattle train and taken to Poland. He manages to escape, saved by God, he believes, so that he might save the Jews of Sighet. He returns to the village to tell what he calls the "story of his own death", running from one house to the next: "Jews, listen to me! It's all I ask of you. No money. No pity. Just listen to me!"

When the train crossed into Poland, he tells them, it was taken over by the Gestapo, the German secret police. The Jews were transferred to trucks, then driven to a forest in Galicia, near Kolomay, where they were forced to dig pits. When they had finished, each prisoner had to approach the hole, present his neck, and was shot. Babies were thrown into the air and used as targets by machine gunners. He tells them about Malka, the young girl who took three days to die, and Tobias, the tailor who begged to be killed before his sons; and how he, Moshe, was shot in the leg and taken for dead. But the Jews of Sighet would not listen, making Moshe Night's first unheeded witness.

The Germans arrived in Sighet around 21 March 1944, and shortly after Passover (8–14 April that year) arrested the community leaders. Jews had to hand over their valuables, were not allowed to visit restaurants or leave home after six in the evening, and had to wear the yellow star at all times. Eliezer's father makes light of it:

The yellow star? Oh well, what of it? You don't die of it ...

(Poor Father! Of what then did you die?)

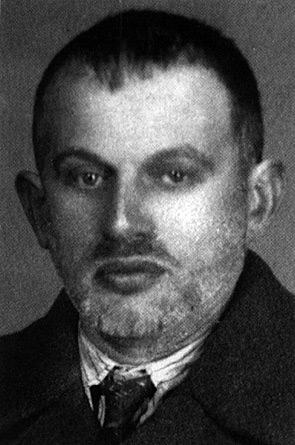
Wiesel's father, Chlomo

The SS transfer the Jews to one of two ghettos, each with its own council or Judenrat, which appoints Jewish police; there is also an office for social assistance, a labor committee, and a hygiene department. Eliezer's house, on a corner of Serpent Street, is in the larger ghetto in the town centre, so his family can stay in their home, although the windows on the non-ghetto side have to be boarded up. He is happy at first: "We should no longer have before our eyes those hostile faces, those hate-laden stares. ... The general opinion was that we were going to remain in the ghetto until the end of the war, until the arrival of the Red Army. Then everything would be as before. It was neither German nor Jew who ruled the ghetto—it was illusion."

In May 1944 the Judenrat is told the ghettos will be closed with immediate effect and the residents deported. Eliezer's family is moved at first to the smaller ghetto, but they are not told their final destination, only that they may each take a few personal belongings. The Hungarian police, wielding truncheons and rifle butts, march Eliezer's neighbours through the streets. "It was from that moment that I began to hate them, and my hate is still the only link between us today."

Here came the Rabbi, his back bent, his face shaved ... His mere presence among the deportees added a touch of unreality to the scene. It was like a page torn from some story book ... One by one they passed in front of me, teachers, friends, others, all those I had been afraid of, all those I once could have laughed at, all those I had lived with over the years. They went by, fallen, dragging their packs, dragging their lives, deserting their homes, the years of their childhood, cringing like beaten dogs.

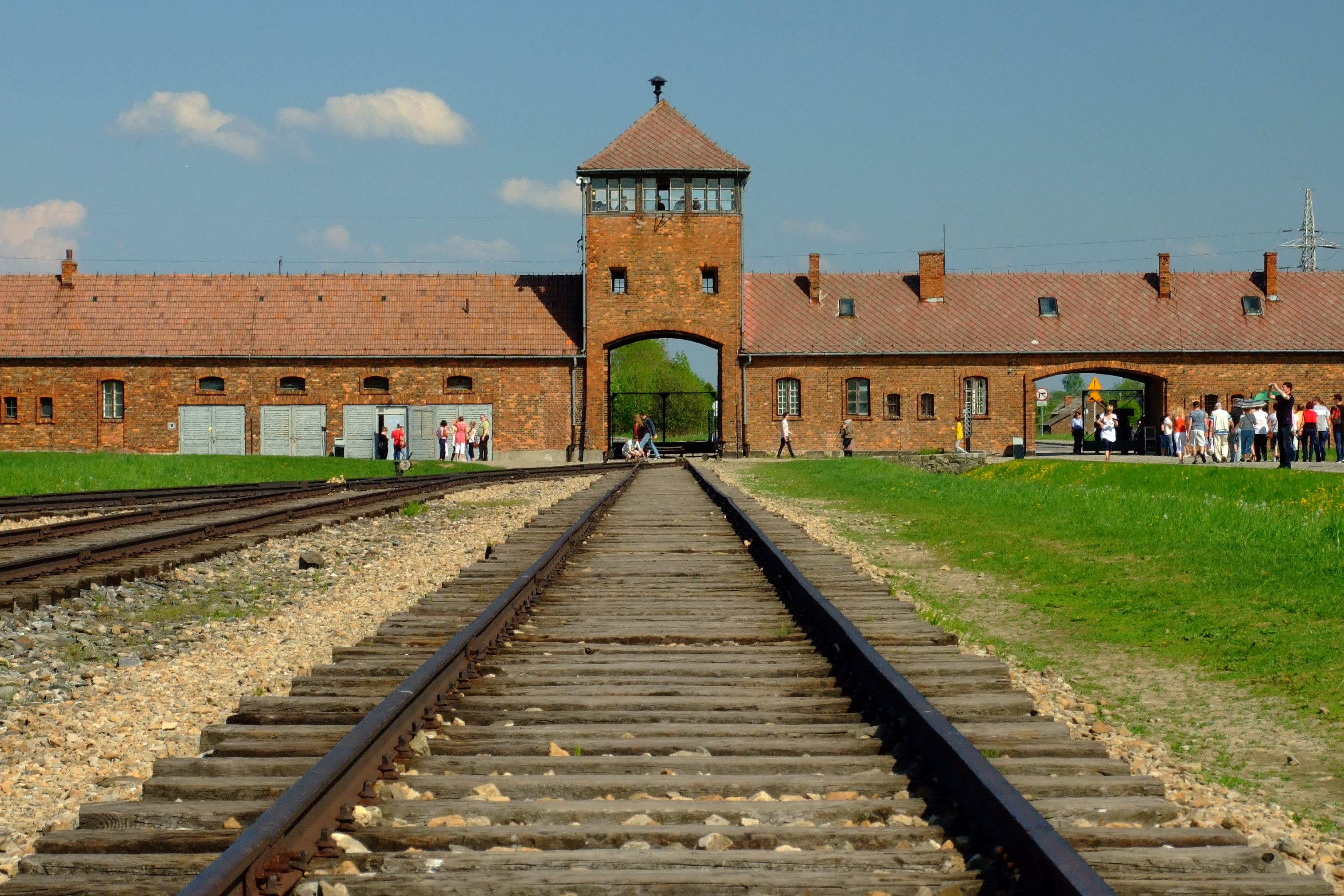
Tracks inside Auschwitz II-Birkenau, German-occupied Poland, leading from the gatehouse to the gas chamber

Eliezer and his family are among the 80 people crammed into a closed cattle wagon. On the third night one woman, Madame Schächter—Night's second unheeded witness—starts screaming that she can see flames, until the others beat her. Men and women are separated on arrival at Auschwitz II-Birkenau, the extermination camp within the Auschwitz complex. Eliezer and his father are "selected" to go to the left, which meant forced labour; his mother, Hilda, Beatrice and Tzipora to the right, the gas chamber. (Hilda and Beatrice managed to survive.)

Men to the left! Women to the right!

Eight words spoken quietly, indifferently, without emotion. Eight short, simple words. ... For a part of a second I glimpsed my mother and my sisters moving away to the right. Tzipora held Mother's hand. I saw them disappear into the distance; my mother was stroking my sister's fair hair ...and I did not know that in that place, at that moment, I was parting from my mother and Tzipora forever.

The remainder of Night describes Eliezer's efforts not to be parted from his father, not even to lose sight of him; his grief and shame at witnessing his father's decline into helplessness; and as their relationship changes and the young man becomes the older man's caregiver, his resentment and guilt, because his father's existence threatens his own. The stronger Eliezer's need to survive, the weaker the bonds that tie him to other people.

His loss of faith in human relationships is mirrored in his loss of faith in God. During the first night, as he and his father wait in line, he watches a lorry deliver its load of children's bodies into the fire. While his father recites the Kaddish, the Jewish prayer for the dead—Wiesel writes that in the long history of the Jews, he does not know whether people have ever recited the prayer for the dead for themselves—Eliezer considers throwing himself against the electric fence. At that moment he and his father are ordered to go to their barracks. But Eliezer is already destroyed. "[T]he student of the Talmud, the child that I was, had been consumed in the flames. There remained only a shape that looked like me." There follows a passage that Ellen Fine writes contains the main themes of Night—the death of God and innocence, and the défaite du moi (dissolution of self), a recurring motif in Holocaust literature:

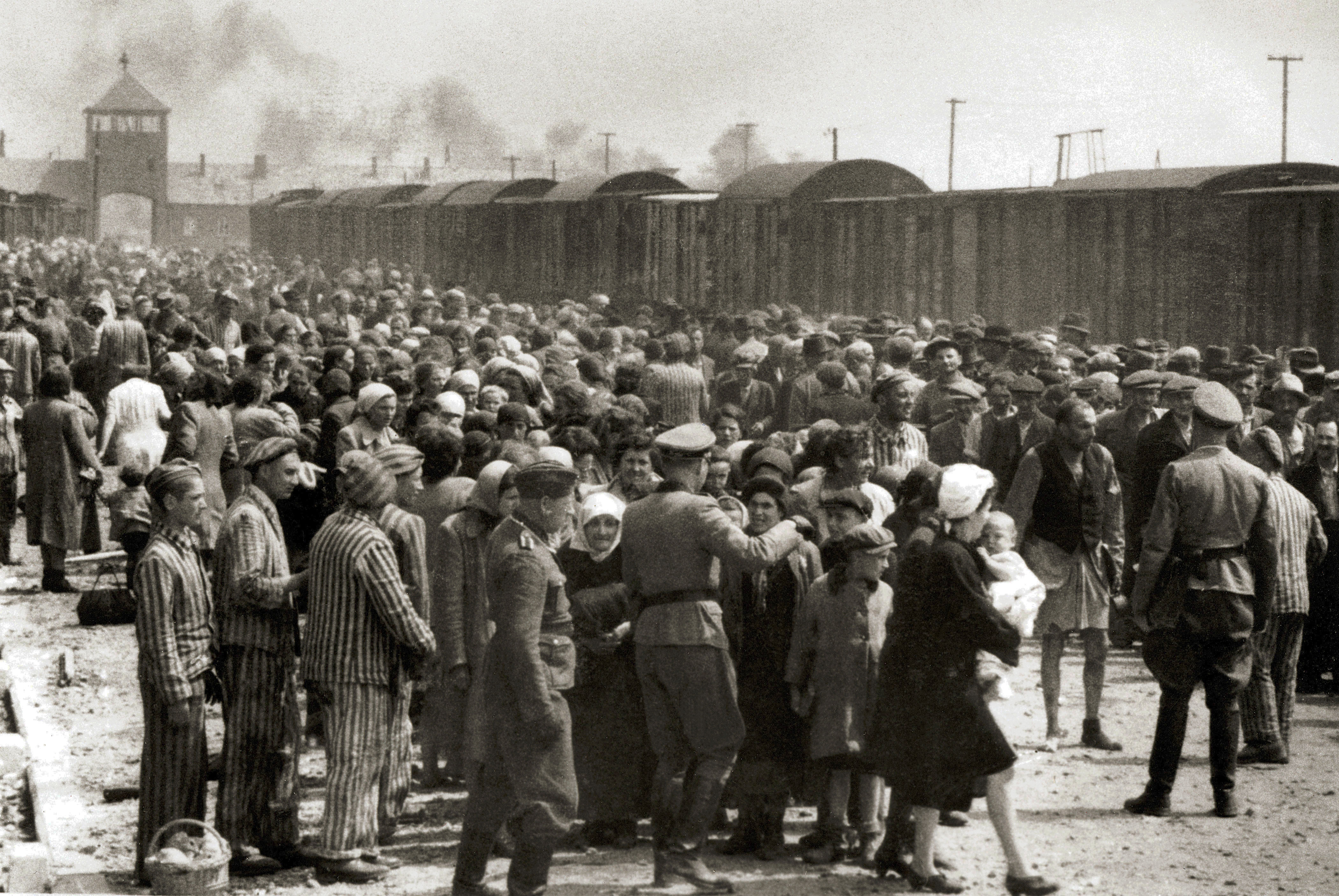
Hungarian Jews arrive at Auschwitz II-Birkenau, c. May 1944.

Never shall I forget that night, the first night in camp, which has turned my life into one long night, seven times cursed and seven times sealed. Never shall I forget that smoke. Never shall I forget the little faces of the children, whose bodies I saw turned into wreaths of smoke beneath a silent blue sky.

Never shall I forget those flames which consumed my faith forever.

Never shall I forget that nocturnal silence which deprived me, for all eternity, of the desire to live. Never shall I forget those moments which murdered my God and my soul and turned my dreams to dust. Never shall I forget these things, even if I am condemned to live as long as God Himself. Never.

With the loss of self goes Eliezer's sense of time: "I glanced at my father. How he had changed! ... So much had happened within such a few hours that I had lost all sense of time. When had we left our houses? And the ghetto? And the train? Was it only a week? One night – one single night?"

In or around August 1944 Eliezer and his father are transferred from Birkenau to the work camp at Monowitz (known as Buna or Auschwitz III), their lives reduced to the avoidance of violence and the search for food. Their only joy is when the Americans bomb the camp. God is not lost to Eliezer entirely. During the hanging of a child, which the camp is forced to watch, he hears someone ask: Where is God? Where is he? Not heavy enough for the weight of his body to break his neck, the boy dies slowly. Wiesel files past him, sees his tongue still pink and his eyes clear.

Behind me, I heard the same man asking: Where is God now?

And I heard a voice within me answer him: ... Here He is—He is hanging here on this gallows.

Fine writes that this is the central event in Night, a religious sacrifice—the binding of Isaac and crucifixion of Jesus—described by Alfred Kazin as the literal death of God. Afterwards the inmates celebrate Rosh Hashanah, the Jewish new year, but Eliezer cannot take part: "Blessed be God's name? Why, but why would I bless Him? Every fiber in me rebelled ... How could I say to Him: Blessed be Thou, Almighty, Master of the Universe, who chose us among all nations to be tortured day and night, to watch as our fathers, our mothers, our brothers end up in the furnaces? ... But now, I no longer pleaded for anything. I was no longer able to lament. On the contrary, I felt very strong. I was the accuser, God the accused."

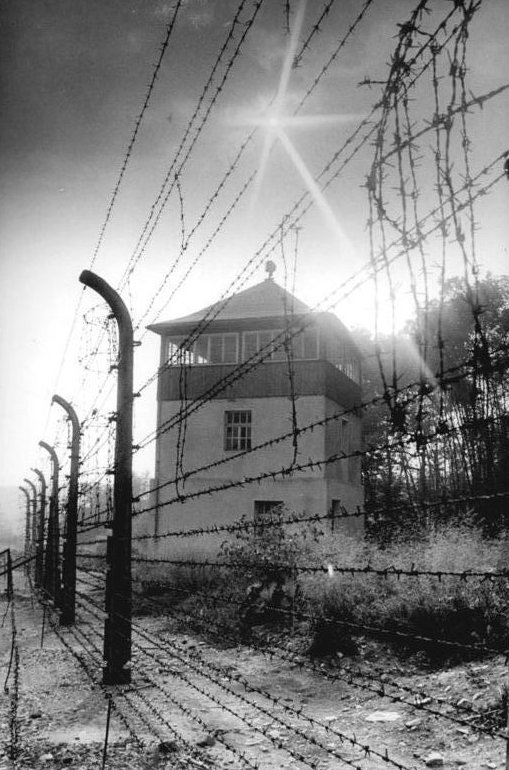
Buchenwald concentration camp

In January 1945, with the Soviet army approaching, the Germans decide to flee, taking 56,000 inmates on a death march to concentration camps in Germany. Eliezer and his father are marched to Gleiwitz to be put on a freight train to Buchenwald, a camp near Weimar, Germany, 350 miles (563 km) from Auschwitz.

Pitch darkness. Every now and then, an explosion in the night. They had orders to fire on any who could not keep up. Their fingers on the triggers, they did not deprive themselves of this pleasure. If one of us had stopped for a second, a sharp shot finished off another filthy son of a bitch.

Near me, men were collapsing in the dirty snow. Shots.

Resting in a shed after marching over 40 miles (64 km), Rabbi Eliahou asks if anyone has seen his son. They had stuck together for three years, "always near each other, for suffering, for blows, for the ration of bread, for prayer", but the rabbi had lost sight of him in the crowd and was now scratching through the snow looking for his son's corpse. "I hadn't any strength left for running. And my son didn't notice. That's all I know." Eliezer does not tell the man that his son had indeed noticed his father limping, and had run faster, letting the distance between them grow: "And, in spite of myself, a prayer rose in my heart, to that God in whom I no longer believed. My God, Lord of the Universe, give me strength never to do what Rabbi Eliahou's son has done."

The inmates spend two days and nights in Gleiwitz locked inside cramped barracks without food, water or heat, sleeping on top of one another, so that each morning the living wake with the dead underneath them. There is more marching to the train station and onto a cattle wagon with no roof. They travel for ten days and nights, with only the snow falling on them for water. Of the 100 in Eliezer's wagon, 12 survive the journey. The living make space by throwing the dead onto the tracks:

I woke from my apathy just at the moment when two men came up to my father. I threw myself on top of his body. He was cold. I slapped him. I rubbed his hand, crying:

Father! Father! Wake up. They're trying to throw you out of the carriage ...

His body remained inert ...

I set to work to slap him as hard as I could. After a moment, my father's eyelids moved slightly over his glazed eyes. He was breathing weakly.

You see, I cried.

The two men moved away.

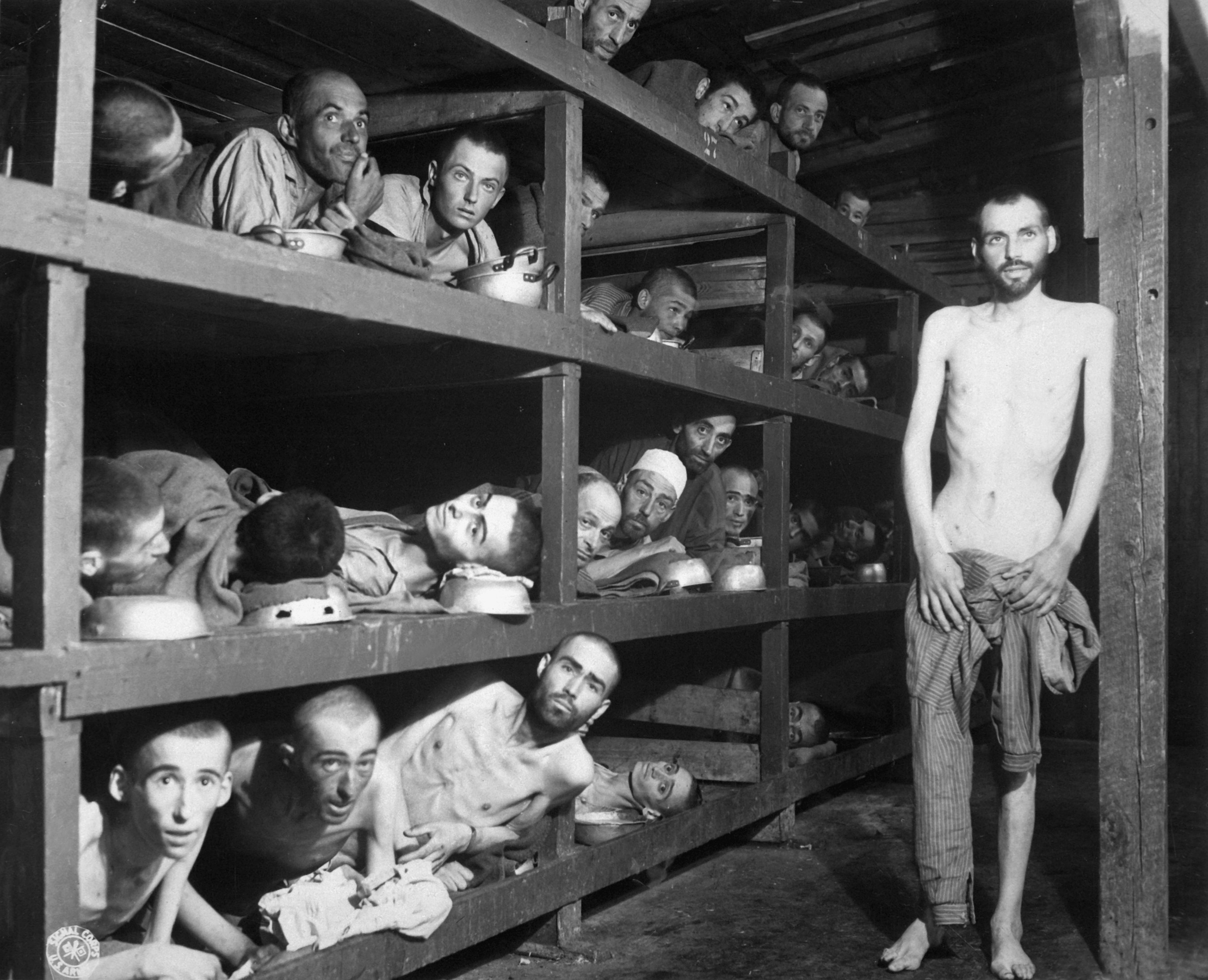
Buchenwald, 16 April 1945: Wiesel, second row, seventh from left

The Germans are waiting with megaphones and orders to head for a hot bath. Wiesel is desperate for the heat of the water, but his father sinks into the snow. "I could have wept with rage ... I showed him the corpses all around him; they too had wanted to rest here ... I yelled against the wind ... I felt I was not arguing with him, but with death itself, with the death he had already chosen." An alert sounds, the camp lights go out, and Eliezer, exhausted, follows the crowd to the barracks, leaving his father behind. He wakes at dawn on a wooden bunk, remembering that he has a father, and goes in search of him.

But at that same moment this thought came into my mind. Don't let me find him! If only I could get rid of this dead weight, so that I could use all my strength to struggle for my own survival, and only worry about myself. Immediately I felt ashamed of myself, ashamed forever.

His father is in another block, sick with dysentery. The other men in his bunk, a Frenchman and a Pole, attack him because he can no longer go outside to relieve himself. Eliezer is unable to protect him. "Another wound to the heart, another hate, another reason for living lost." Begging for water one night from his bunk, where he has lain for a week, Chlomo is beaten on the head with a truncheon by an SS officer for making too much noise. Eliezer lies in the bunk above and does nothing for fear of being beaten too. He hears his father make a rattling noise, "Eliezer". In the morning, 29 January 1945, he finds another man in his father's place. The Kapos had come before dawn and taken Chlomo to the crematorium.

His last word was my name. A summons, to which I did not respond.

I did not weep, and it pained me that I could not weep. But I had no more tears. And, in the depths of my being, in the recesses of my weakened conscience, could I have searched for it, I might perhaps have found something like – free at last!

Chlomo missed his freedom by three months. The Soviets had liberated Auschwitz 11 days earlier, and the Americans were making their way towards Buchenwald. Eliezer is transferred to the children's block where he stays with 600 others, dreaming of soup. On 5 April 1945 the inmates are told the camp is to be liquidated and they are to be moved—another death march. On 11 April, with 20,000 inmates still inside, a resistance movement inside the camp attacks the remaining SS officers and takes control. At six o'clock that evening, an American tank arrives at the gates, and behind it the Sixth Armored Division of the United States Third Army. Wiesel looks at himself in a mirror for the first time since the ghetto and sees only a corpse.

== Writing and publishing ==
=== Move to France ===
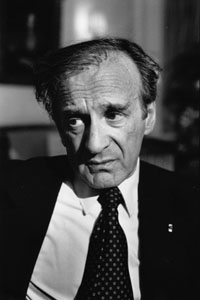
Elie Wiesel, 1987

Wiesel wanted to move to Palestine after his release, but because of British immigration restrictions was sent instead by the Oeuvre au Secours aux Enfants (Children's Rescue Service) to Belgium, then Normandy. In Normandy he learned that his two older sisters, Hilda and Beatrice, had survived. From 1947 to 1950 he studied the Talmud, philosophy and literature at the Sorbonne, where he was influenced by the existentialists, attending lectures by Jean-Paul Sartre and Martin Buber. He also taught Hebrew, and worked as a translator for the Yiddish weekly Zion in Kamf. In 1948, when he was 19, he was sent to Israel as a war correspondent by the French newspaper L'arche, and after the Sorbonne became chief foreign correspondent of the Tel Aviv newspaper Yedioth Ahronoth.

=== 1954: Un di Velt Hot Geshvign ===
Wiesel wrote in 1979 that he kept his story to himself for ten years. In 1954 he wanted to interview the French prime minister, Pierre Mendès-France, and approached the novelist François Mauriac, a friend of Mendès-France, for an introduction. Wiesel wrote that Mauriac kept mentioning Jesus: "Whatever I would ask – Jesus. Finally, I said, 'What about Mendès-France?' He said that Mendès-France, like Jesus, was suffering ..."

When he said Jesus again I couldn't take it, and for the only time in my life I was discourteous, which I regret to this day. I said, "Mr. Mauriac", we called him Maître, "ten years or so ago, I have seen children, hundreds of Jewish children, who suffered more than Jesus did on his cross and we do not speak about it." I felt all of a sudden so embarrassed. I closed my notebook and went to the elevator. He ran after me. He pulled me back; he sat down in his chair, and I in mine, and he began weeping. ... And then, at the end, without saying anything, he simply said, "You know, maybe you should talk about it."

Wiesel started writing on board a ship to Brazil, where he had been assigned to cover Christian missionaries within Jewish communities, and by the end of the journey had completed an 862-page manuscript. He was introduced on the ship to Yehudit Moretzka, a Yiddish singer travelling with Mark Turkov, a publisher of Yiddish texts. Turkov asked if he could read Wiesel's manuscript. It is unclear who edited the text for publication. Wiesel wrote in All Rivers Run to the Sea (1995) that he handed Turkov his only copy and that it was never returned, but also that he (Wiesel) "cut down the original manuscript from 862 pages to the 245 of the published Yiddish edition." (Note: Wiesel 2010, 241: "As we talked, Turkov noticed my manuscript, from which I was never separated. ... It was my only copy, but Turkov assured me that it would be safe with him." Wiesel 2010, 277: "In December I received from Buenos Aires the first copy of my Yiddish testimony, And the World Stayed Silent, which I had finished on the boat to Brazil. The singer Yehudit Moretzka and her editor friend Mark Turkov had kept their word—except that they never did send back the manuscript." Wiesel 2010, 319: "I had cut down the original manuscript from 862 pages to the 245 of the published Yiddish edition.")

Turkov's Tzentral Varband für Polishe Yidn in Argentina (Central Union of Polish Jews in Argentina) published the book in 1956 in Buenos Aires as the 245-page Un di velt hot geshvign (און די וועלט האָט געשוויגן; "And the World Remained Silent"). It was the 117th book in a 176-volume series of Yiddish memoirs of Poland and the war, Dos poylishe yidntum (Polish Jewry, 1946–1966). Ruth Wisse writes that Un di Velt Hot Geshvign stood out from the rest of the series, which survivors wrote as memorials to their dead, as a "highly selective and isolating literary narrative".

=== Unpublished Hebrew manuscript ===
In the late 1950s, Wiesel wrote a manuscript that he intended to turn into a special, expanded Hebrew-language version of Night. However, before completion, Wiesel placed the unfinished text in his archive, later discovered in 2016 by Wiesel's friend, Yoel Rappel, a historian and curator of his archive at Boston University.

The archived version included harsh criticisms of Jews who were too optimistic about the future, Jewish leaders who did not speak up, and Wiesel's Hungarian neighbors who "joyously watched the Jews" being deported. These were not included in the English-language version later published in 1960.

According to Rappel, this version of Night was intended for an Israeli audience, including survivors from Auschwitz and Buchenwald living in Israel.

=== 1958: La Nuit ===
Wiesel translated Un di Velt Hot Geshvign into French and in 1955 sent it to Mauriac. Even with Mauriac's help they had difficulty finding a publisher; Wiesel said they found it too morbid. Jérôme Lindon of Les Éditions de Minuit, Samuel Beckett's publisher, agreed to handle it. Lindon edited the text down to 178 pages. Published as La Nuit, a title chosen by Lindon, it had a preface by Mauriac and was dedicated to Chlomo, Sarah and Tzipora.

=== 1960: Night ===
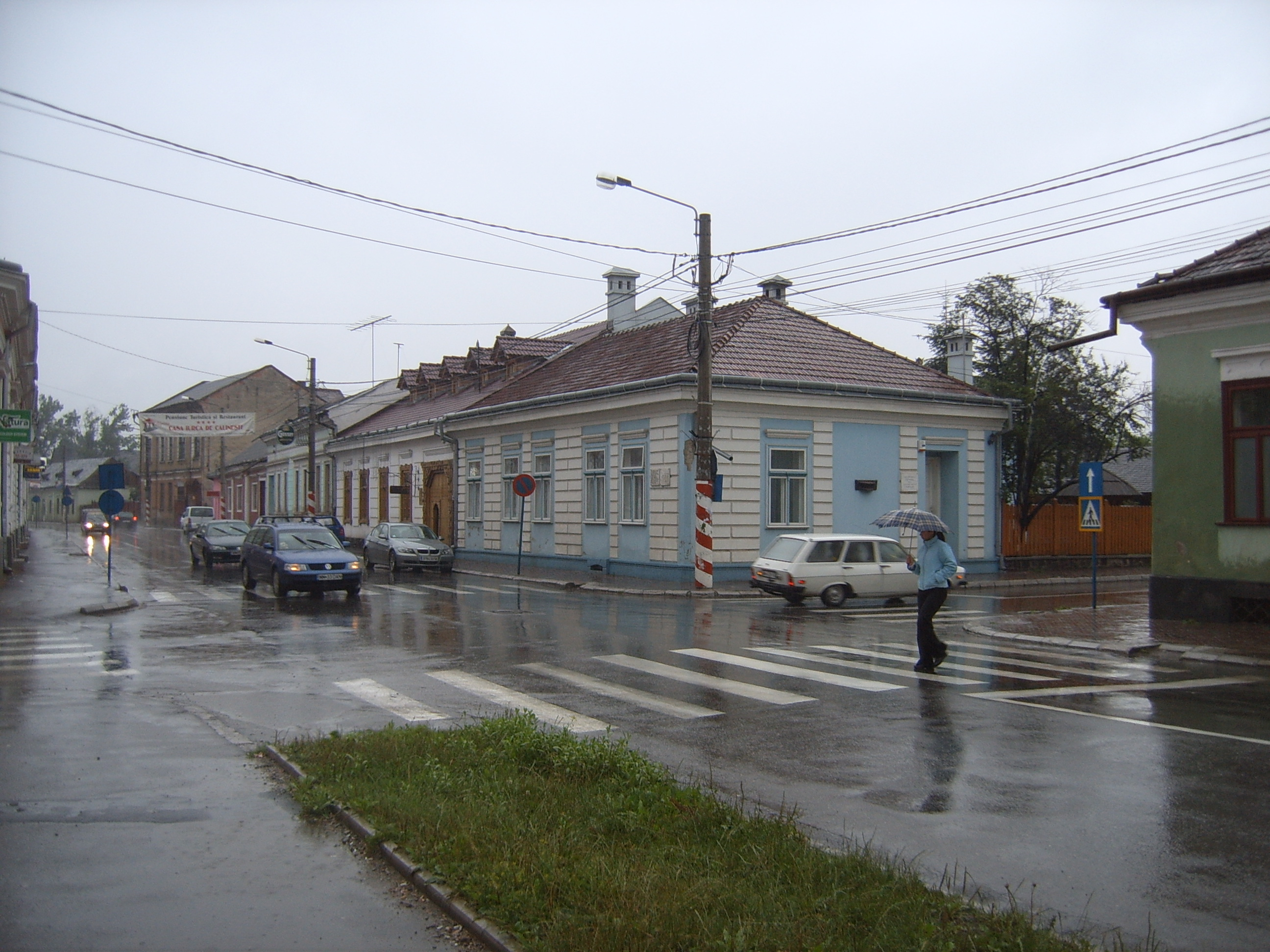
Wiesel's birthplace in Sighet, photographed in 2007

Wiesel's New York agent, Georges Borchardt, encountered the same difficulty finding a publisher in the United States. In 1960 Arthur Wang of Hill & Wang in New York—who Wiesel writes "believed in literature as others believe in God"—paid a $100 pro-forma advance and published that year a 116-page English translation by Stella Rodway as Night. The first 18 months saw 1,046 copies sell at $3 each, and it took three years to sell the first print run of 3,000 copies, but the book attracted interest from reviewers, leading to television interviews and meetings with literary figures like Saul Bellow.

By 1997 Night was selling 300,000 copies a year in the United States. By 2011 it had sold six million copies in that country, and was available in 30 languages. Sales increased in January 2006 when it was chosen for Oprah's Book Club. Republished with a new translation by Marion Wiesel, Wiesel's wife, and a new preface by Wiesel, it sat at no. 1 in The New York Times bestseller list for paperback non-fiction for 18 months from 13 February 2006, until the newspaper removed it when a significant portion of sales were ascribed to educational usage rather than retail sales. It became the club's third bestseller to date, with over two million sales of the Book Club edition by May 2011.

== Reception ==
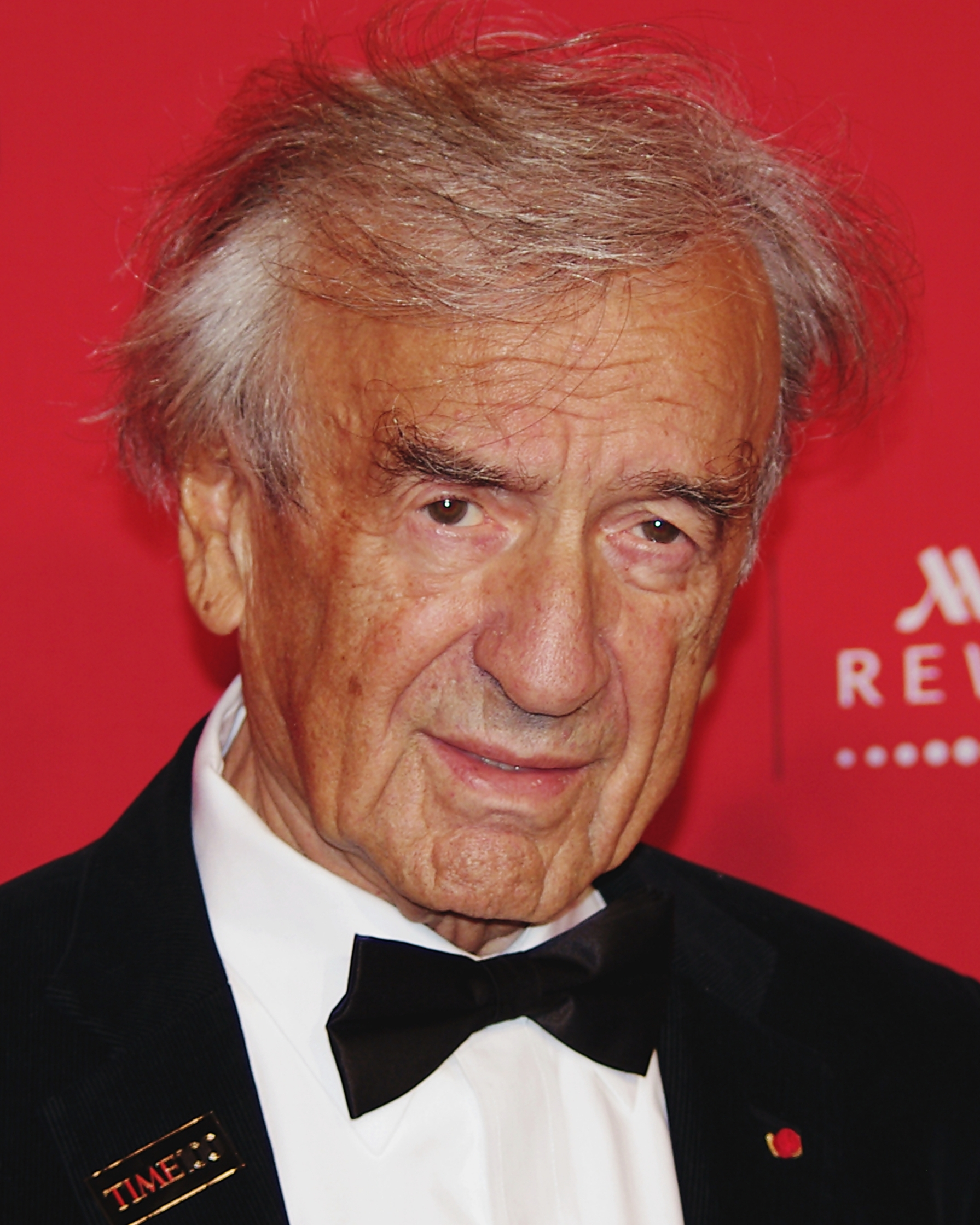
Elie Wiesel, May 2010

Reviewers have had difficulty reading Night as an eyewitness account. According to literary scholar Gary Weissman, it has been categorized as a "novel/autobiography", "autobiographical novel", "non-fictional novel", "semi-fictional memoir", "fictional-autobiographical novel", "fictionalized autobiographical memoir", and "memoir-novel". Ellen Fine described it as témoignage (testimony). Wiesel called it his deposition.

Literary critic Ruth Franklin writes that Night's impact stems from its minimalist construction. The 1954 Yiddish manuscript, at 862 pages, was a long and angry historical work. In preparing the Yiddish and then the French editions, Wiesel's editors pruned mercilessly. Franklin argues that the power of the narrative was achieved at the cost of literal truth, and that to insist that the work is purely factual is to ignore its literary sophistication. Holocaust scholar Lawrence Langer argues similarly that Wiesel evokes, rather than describes: "Wiesel's account is ballasted with the freight of fiction: scenic organization, characterization through dialogue, periodic climaxes, elimination of superfluous or repetitive episodes, and especially an ability to arouse the empathy of his readers, which is an elusive ideal of the writer bound by fidelity to fact."

Franklin writes that Night is the account of the 15-year-old Eliezer, a "semi-fictional construct", told by the 25-year-old Elie Wiesel. This allows the 15-year-old to tell his story from "the post-Holocaust vantage point" of Night's readers. In a comparative analysis of the Yiddish and French texts, Naomi Seidman, professor of Jewish culture, concludes that there are two survivors in Wiesel's writing, a Yiddish and French. In re-writing rather than simply translating Un di Velt Hot Geshvign, Wiesel replaced an angry survivor who regards "testimony as a refutation of what the Nazis did to the Jews," with one "haunted by death, whose primary complaint is directed against God ..." Night transformed the Holocaust into a religious event.

Seidman argues that the Yiddish version was for Jewish readers, who wanted to hear about revenge, but the anger was removed for the largely Christian readership of the French translation. In the Yiddish edition, for example, when Buchenwald was liberated: "Early the next day Jewish boys ran off to Weimar to steal clothing and potatoes. And to rape German shiksas [un tsu fargvaldikn daytshe shikses]. The historical commandment of revenge was not fulfilled." In the 1958 French and 1960 English editions, this became: "On the following morning, some of the young men went to Weimar to get some potatoes and clothes—and to sleep with girls [coucher avec des filles]. But of revenge, not a sign."

Oprah Winfrey's promotion of Night came at a difficult time for the genre of memoir, Franklin writes, after a previous book-club author, James Frey, was found to have fabricated parts of his autobiography, A Million Little Pieces (2003). She argues that Winfrey's choice of Night may have been intended to restore the book club's credibility.

Wiesel wrote in 1967 about a visit to a rebbe (a Hasidic rabbi) who he had not seen for 20 years. The rebbe is upset to learn that Wiesel has become a writer, and wants to know what he writes. "Stories," Wiesel tells him, " ... true stories":

About people you knew? "Yes, about people I might have known." About things that happened? "Yes, about things that happened or could have happened." But they did not? "No, not all of them did. In fact, some were invented from almost the beginning to almost the end." The Rebbe leaned forward as if to measure me up and said with more sorrow than anger: That means you are writing lies! I did not answer immediately. The scolded child within me had nothing to say in his defense. Yet, I had to justify myself: "Things are not that simple, Rebbe. Some events do take place but are not true; others are—although they never occurred."

== Sources ==
=== Works cited ===
- Berenbaum, Michael (2002). "Foreword". In Braham, Randolph L.; Miller, Scott (eds.). The Nazis' Last Victims: The Holocaust in Hungary. Detroit: Wayne State University Press.
- Braham, Randolph (2000) [1981]. The Politics of Genocide: The Holocaust in Hungary. Detroit: Wayne State University Press.
- Braham, Randolph L. (2016). The Politics of Genocide: The Holocaust in Hungary. Vol. 1. New York: Columbia University Press. ISBN 978-0880337113.
- Fine, Ellen S. (1982). Legacy of Night: The Literary Universe of Elie Wiesel. New York: State University of New York Press. ISBN 9781438402796.
- Franklin, Ruth (2011). A Thousand Darknesses: Lies and Truth in Holocaust Fiction. New York: Oxford University Press. ISBN 9780199779772.
- Langer, Lawrence L. (2001). "The Dominion of Death". In Bloom, Harold (ed.). Elie Wiesel's Night. New York: Infobase Publishing.
- Rosen, Alan (2002). "Elie Wiesel". In Kremer, S. Lillian (ed.). Holocaust Literature: An Encyclopedia of Writers and Their Work, Vol III. New York: Taylor & Francis.
- Roseman, Mark (2010). "Holocaust Perpetrators in Victims' Eyes". In Wiese, Christian; Betts, Paul (eds.). Years of Persecution, Years of Extermination: Saul Friedländer and the Future of Holocaust Studies. London: Bloomsbury Publishing.
- Seidman, Naomi (Autumn 1996). "Elie Wiesel and the Scandal of Jewish Rage". Jewish Social Studies. 3 (1): 1–19. JSTOR 4467484.
- Seidman, Naomi (2010). Faithful Renderings: Jewish-Christian Difference and the Politics of Translation. Chicago: University of Chicago Press.
- Sternlicht, Sanford V. (2003). Student Companion to Elie Wiesel. New York: Greenwood Publishing Group.
- Weissman, Gary (2004). Fantasies of Witnessing: Postwar Efforts to Experience the Holocaust. Ithaca: Cornell University Press. ISBN 9780801442537.
- Wiesel, Elie (1982) [1960]. Night. New York: Bantam Books.
- Wiesel, Elie (2011) [1967]. Legends of Our Time. New York: Knopf Doubleday Publishing Group.
- Wiesel, Elie (1979). "An Interview Unlike Any Other". A Jew Today. New York: Knopf Doubleday Publishing Group.
- Wiesel, Elie (2010) [1995]. All Rivers Run to the Sea. New York: Knopf Doubleday Publishing Group.
- Wieviorka, Annette (2006). The Era of the Witness. New York: Cornell University Press. ISBN 9780801443312.
- Wisse, Ruth R. (2003). The Modern Jewish Canon: A Journey Through Language and Culture. Chicago: University of Chicago Press.
