= A Fleeting Encounter =

2022 film directed by Romed Wyder

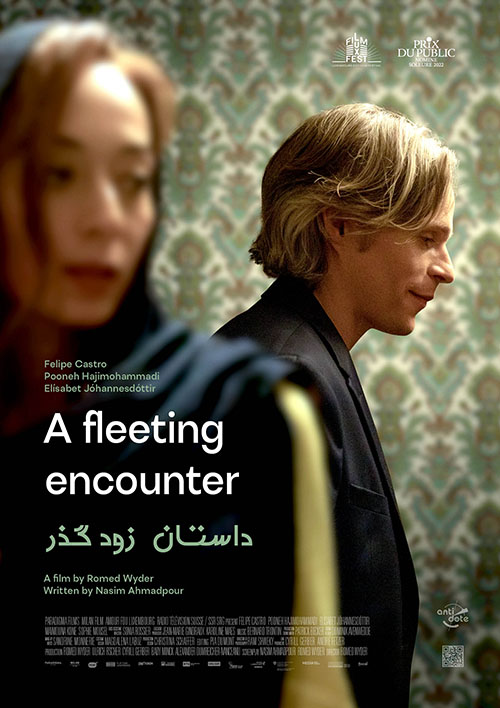
- Theatrical Poster
- French: Une histoire provisoire
- Directed by: Romed Wyder
- Written by: Nasim Ahmadpour; Romed Wyder
- Produced by: Cyrill Gerber; Romed Wyder; Alexander Dumreicher-Ivanceanu; Bady Minck
- Starring: Felipe Castro; Pooneh Hajimohammadi; Elisabet Johannesdottir
- Cinematography: Ram Shweky
- Edited by: Pia Dumont
- Music by: Bernard Trontin
- Production companies: Paradigma Films SA; Milan Film AG; Amour Fou Luxembourg sàrl RTS Radio Télévision Suisse
- Release dates: 21 January 2022 (Solothurn Film Festival); 4 May 2022 (Luxembourg); 11 May 2022 (Switzerland)
- Running time: 85 minutes
- Countries: Switzerland; Luxembourg
- Languages: French; English; Persian

A Fleeting Encounter (Une histoire provisoire) in French is a 2022 Swiss-Luxembourgish drama film co-written, co-produced and directed by Romed Wyder.

== Synopsis ==
Sacha, a Genevan in the midst of a midlife crisis, has just broken up with his girlfriend and ends up in his grandparents' Airbnb, where he is forced to cohabit with Marjan, an Iranian woman who is more or less in the same situation. Two dissatisfied people, each seeking to be alone, involuntarily thrown into a closed space, trying to deal with their problems and where the other is experienced as an aggression. Then Mina arrives, an American woman full of life... The two protagonists will then, little by little, abandon their prejudices, forgetting themselves in the present moments and the possible futures of an involuntary meeting.

== Cast ==
- Felipe Castro: Sasha
- Pooneh Hajimohammadi: Marjan
- Elisabet Johannesdottir: Mina
- Sophie Mousel
- Paulo dos Santos
- Tommy Schlesser
- Larisa Faber
- Clea Eden
- Maimouna Kone

== Release ==
The film celebrates its premiere on 21 January 2022, as part of the Solothurn Film Festival where it was nominated for the Audience Award. It was theatrically released on May 4 of the same year in Luxembourg and May 11 in Switzerland. Princ Films is in charge of international sales.
The film was selected at many international film festivals, including Luxembourg City Film Festival 2022, Iranian Film Festival Zurich 2022, Iranian Film Festival San Francisco 2022, Cinéfest Sudbury (Canada) 2022, Batumi Int. Art-House Film Festival (Georgia) 2022, Syracuse Int. Film Festival 2022, International Festival. del Cinema di Salerno (Italy) 2022, Phoenix Film Festival (USA) 2023, Palm Beach Int. Film Festival 2023.
The VOD release in Luxembourg and Switzerland took place on 24 February 2023.

== Awards ==
Giles Foreman received the Special Prize from the Swiss Film Academy 2023 for his work as an actor coach, notably on A fleeting encounter.
The film was awarded with the Grand Jury Prize for the best fiction feature film at the ONE country ONE film Festival in Apchat-Issoire 2023.

== Critical reception ==
- "Undeniably sensitive, a true mastery of film art." Antoine Duplan, Time
- "A finely described story where the smallest details is significant." Sabina Schwob, Ciné-feuilles
- "A quirky, warm and seductive film." Sennhausers Filmblog
- "A moving romantic encounter behind closed doors." Mathieu Loewer, The Courier
- "Pooneh Hajimohammadi and Felipe Castro excel with their natural and minimalist playing." Pascal Gavillet, La Tribune de Genève
- "A film about crises and ways to overcome them. And how to rediscover the desire (of life)." Anne Laure Gannac, RTS The first
