= Day (Wiesel novel) =

1962 novel by Elie Wiesel

- Author: Elie Wiesel
- Original title: Le Jour
- Translator: Anne Borchardt
- Language: French
- Publisher: Éditions du Seuil
- Publication date: March 1, 1961
- ISBN: 978-2-020-00958-4
- Preceded by: Dawn (1961)

Day, published in 1962, is the third book in a trilogy by Romanian-born American writer and political activist Elie Wiesel—Night, Dawn, and Day—describing his experiences and thoughts during and after the Holocaust.

== Author ==
Elie Wiesel is well known for his memoir Night that later spawned the trilogy of which Day is the final book. Wiesel has written more than fifty books and has won the Nobel Peace Prize. Soon after earning the Nobel Prize, Wiesel and his wife Marion founded the Elie Wiesel Foundation for Humanity.

Eliezer Wiesel explains, "In Night, it is the 'I' who speaks. In the other two, it is the 'I' who listens and questions."

== Plot ==
Day is the story of a Holocaust survivor who is struck by a taxicab in New York City. While recovering from his injuries, the character reflects on his relationships and experiences during the Second World War, coming to terms with his survival and the deaths of his family and friends. The book was published in the UK as The Accident.

== Main Characters ==
- Eliezer Wiesel
- Kathleen
- Gyula
- Dr. Paul Russel (Dr. Paul Braunstein inspired this role. The book was dedicated to Dr. Paul Braunstein)
