= Nadia Latif =

British director

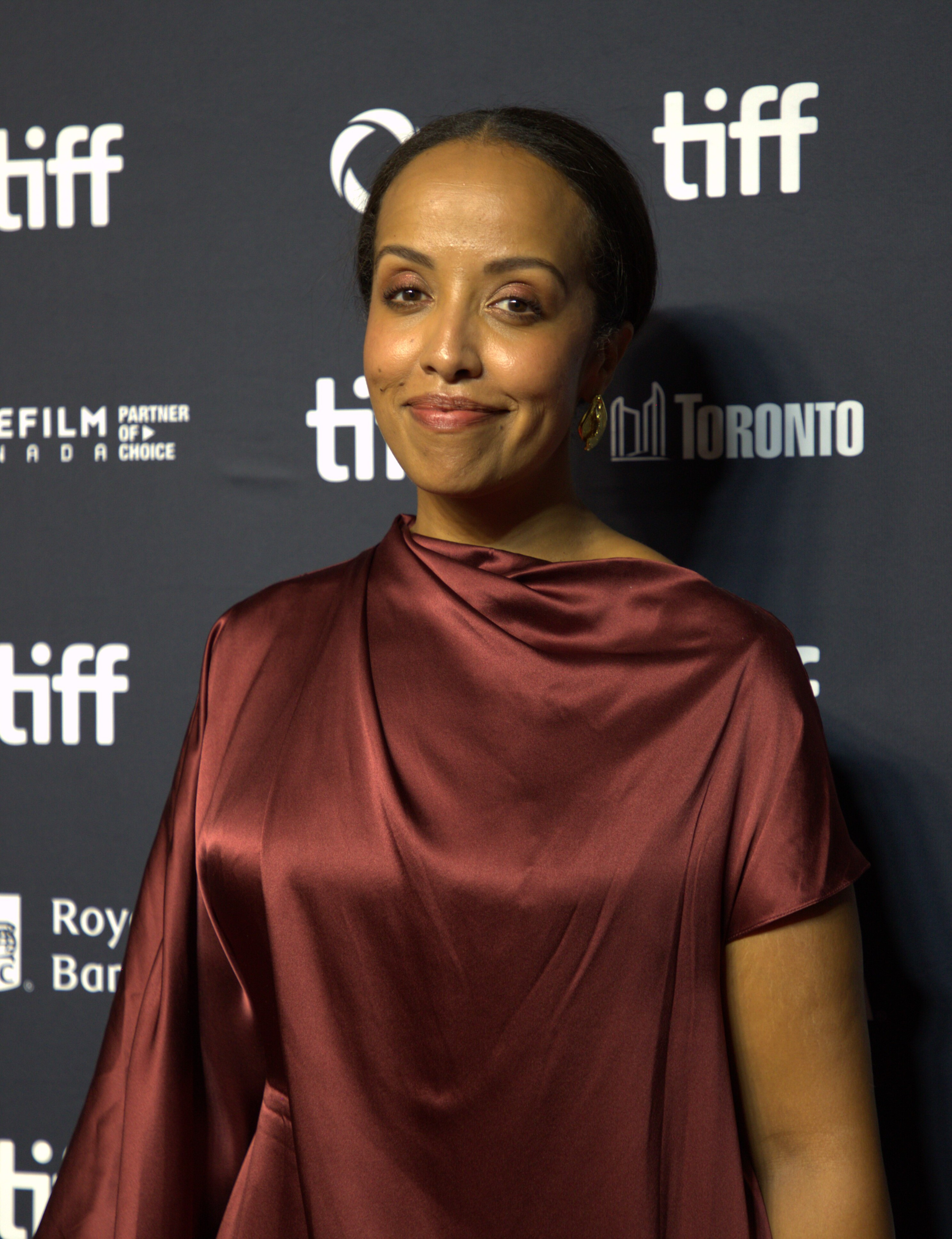
- Latif at TIFF 2025.
- Education: University College London, RADA
- Occupation: Director

Nadia Latif is a British-Sudanese theatre producer and director. Her directoral debut, The Man in My Basement, starring William Dafoe, was released in October 2025.

She is mostly known for her work in theatre production, having worked with a number of British companies including the Almeida, Royal Shakespeare Company, National, Bush, Theatre503 and Arcol. Latif was long-listed for BAFTA's outstanding debut by a British writer, director, or producer for her 2025 debut film.

== Early life ==
Latif grew up Khartoum and spent summers in London, attending theatre regularly, before her family moved to England when she was 14. She has five siblings.

Latif attended Unity High School in Khartoum and then Roedean School in England, completing her A Levels in 2002. She graduated with a Bachelor of Arts (BA) from University College London (UCL) in 2006. She completed a Graduate Certificate in directing at the Royal Academy of Dramatic Art (RADA) in 2007.

== Career ==
Latif's work as a director was motivated by an early interest in both writing and participating in school plays in Sudan. In 2018, she trained at Royal Academic of Dramatic Arts (RADA) under Bill Gaskill. Having worked across both theatre and film, Latif has acknowledged the differences between the two, particularly how the director is expected to prepare the actors for being in a film role vs. on stage for multiple performances.

She is known for her unconventional scripts as a playwright, and ability to create convincing environments, such as her adaptation of Fairview's American setting to UK norms. She has also written extensively about race, gender and popular culture, contributing to The Guardian from 2016 to 2017, where she is best known for introducing a form of the Bechdel test for black characters in film alongside her sister; self-named the Latif test. She is currently a contributor at Frieze magazine.

=== Theatre ===
In 2015, the National Youth Theatre cancelled the production of an original play, Homegrown, she was set to direct, due to the sensitive topic, and police were called to investigate the script. The script was later published, although the play never ran.

In 2019, she was appointed Associate Director of the Young Vic Theatre, notably directing Jackie Sibblies-Drury's Pulitzer Prize winning play Fairview there, and receiving a Genesis Fellow appointment from the Genesis Foundation in 2018.

=== Film ===
She has been recognized in a number of film festivals for her directorial work, prior to her debut, receiving placement in the Sundance Screenwriter's Lab in 2020. In 2019 Screen International listed Latif as one of its filmmaker "stars of tomorrow". Her 2022 film They Heard Him Shout Allahu Akbar was shown as part of Film4's Foresight Shorts series. Latif has worked on TV series and short films, as a director on Foresight in 2021, and director of the short film, White Girl in 2019.

Latif's projects, including The Man in My Basement, thematically discuss blackness and the perception or histories of black and brown individuals in western society. Particularly, the film discusses racism, history and identity, at times, perceived to be heavy handed. Given her thematic focus on both personal and historical identities, in a 2025 interview, she stated:

I feel like my work is hopefully trying to always just be disruptive, to disrupt how people understand themselves and the world around them.

== Personal life ==
Latif currently lives in Hackney, London. She speaks conversational Arabic.
