= Rabbit Trap =

2025 film directed by Bryn Chainey

- Theatrical release poster
- Directed by: Bryn Chainey
- Written by: Bryn Chainey
- Produced by: Elijah Wood; Daniel Noah; Lawrence Inglee; Elisa Lleras; Alex Ashworth; Sean Marley
- Starring: Dev Patel; Rosy McEwen; Jade Croot
- Cinematography: Andreas Johannessen
- Edited by: Sam Sneade and Brett W. Bachman
- Music by: Lucrecia Dalt
- Production companies: Bankside Films; SpectreVision; Mad as Birds; Align; Minor Realm Studios
- Distributed by: Magnet Releasing (United States); Picturehouse Entertainment (United Kingdom)
- Release dates: January 24, 2025 (Sundance); September 12, 2025 (United States); January 30, 2026 (United Kingdom)
- Running time: 88 minutes
- Countries: United States; United Kingdom
- Language: English
- Box office: $32,817

Rabbit Trap is a 2025 psychological horror film written and directed by Bryn Chainey in his full-length feature debut, and starring Dev Patel, Rosy McEwen and Jade Croot. It is produced by Bankside Films with SpectreVision.

== Synopsis ==
Set in 1976, the life of a married couple changes following their relocation to an isolated cabin in Wales. When the couple accidentally disturbs a Tylwyth Teg fairy ring, they are suddenly visited by a mysterious child who appears to have ill intentions for them.

== Cast ==
- Dev Patel as Darcy Davenport
- Rosy McEwen as Daphne Davenport
- Jade Croot as the Child

== Production ==
Producing are Elijah Wood and Daniel Noah’s SpectreVision and Lawrence Inglee with Elisa Lleras, Alex Ashworth and Sean Marley. Dev Patel stars and also acts as executive producer alongside Wiser Film’s Benjamin Kramer, Carte Blanche’s Kyle Stroud, Tom Ogden, Bankside Films’ Stephen Kelliher and Sophie Green.

Lucrecia Dalt acts as composer on the project, alongside sound designer Graham Reznick and sound supervisor Brent Kiser.

With the film set entirely in a remote cottage, an "ideal location" was initially found in south Wales, and principal photography began in 2023. However, after the cottage's owner withdrew from the agreement, a new cottage had to be found. Additionally, the production company realised that Welsh law prohibited smoking in enclosed public locations, while English law allowed exceptions for the requirements of film roles. This meant that production had to be relocated to England, because filming the two main characters, who are chain-smokers, would otherwise be impossible. Creative Wales suggested using specially disguised e-cigarettes as an alternative, but Chainey decided those would be unrealistic.

Eventually a suitable location was found in North Yorkshire; Chainey was disappointed by being unable to film in Wales, and hopes to make other films there in the future.

== Release ==
Rabbit Trap premiered in the Midnight section at the 2025 Sundance Film Festival on 24 January 2025. The film was released in the United States by Magnolia Pictures on September 12, 2025. The film was released in the United Kingdom on January 30, 2026, by Picturehouse Entertainment.

== Reception ==
On the review aggregator website Rotten Tomatoes, 48% of 58 critics' reviews are positive, with an average rating of 6.1/10. The website's consensus reads: "A bold creative swing that doesn't quite connect, Rabbit Trap captures the attention with its hypnotic soundscape but can't maintain its hold due to a disappointingly thin story." Metacritic, which uses a weighted average, assigned the film a score of 57 out of 100, based on 17 critics, indicating "mixed or average" reviews.
