= John Giwa-Amu =

Film producer

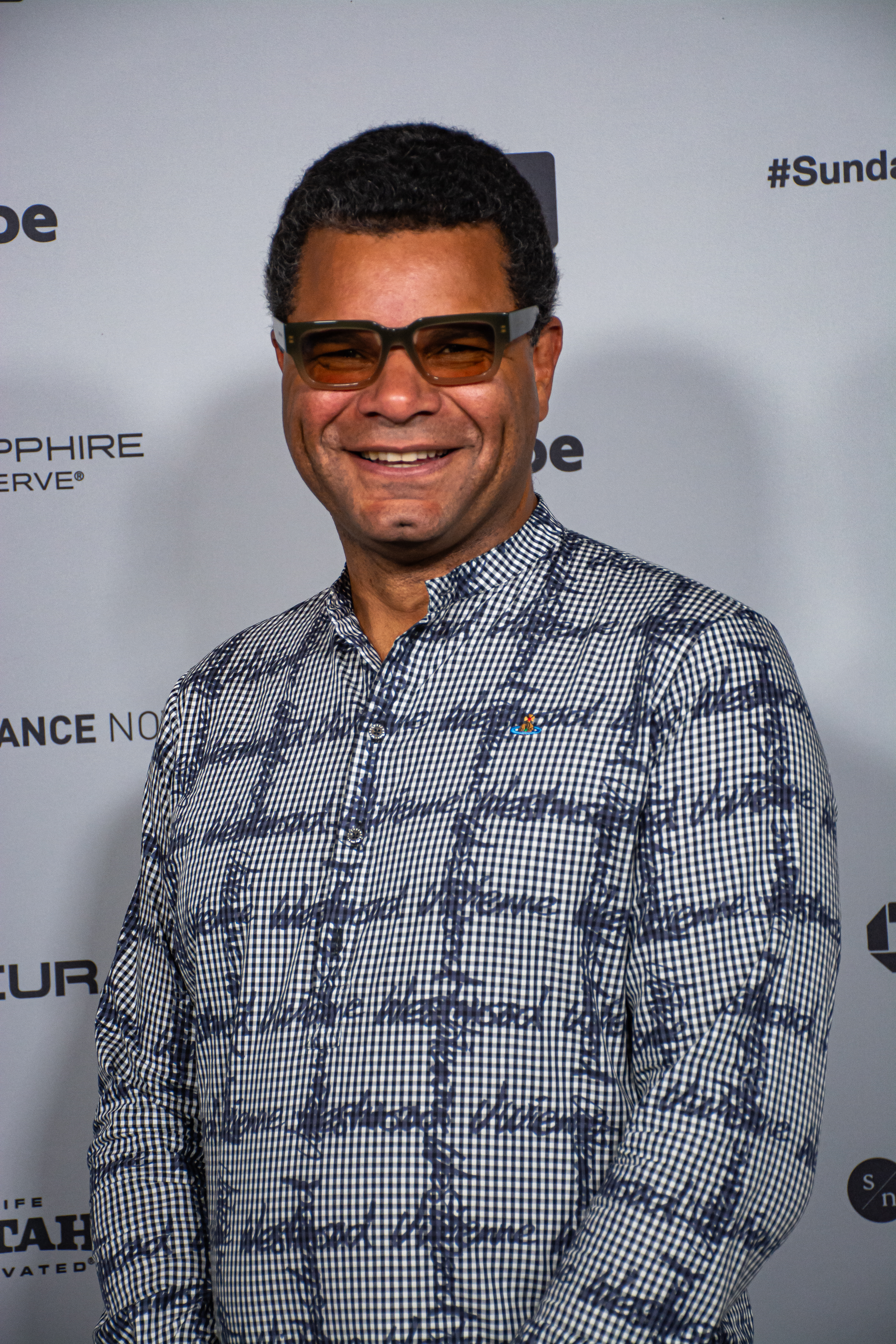
- Giwa-Amu 2026
- Occupation: Film producer
- Years active: 2004–present

John Giwa-Amu is a film producer best known for sci-fi thriller, The Machine, Little White Lies, Don't Knock Twice, The Call Up and The Party. He runs a production, distribution and financing company called Red and Black Films alongside writer/director Caradog James and film, television and gaming company Good Gate Media Ltd.

== Film career ==
Giwa-Amu's first feature was the 2006 BAFTA Cymru winning and BIFA-nominated Little White Lies. At Cannes 2015 Giwa-Amu was named one of the world's most promising new producers by Screen International in its yearly showcase, Future Leaders.

He won the UK Film Council Breakthrough Brits Award in 2008.

The Machine starring Toby Stephens, Caity Lotz, and Denis Lawson was released in cinemas March 2014 The film was commissioned as a TV pilot by NBC Universal/SyFy which Giwa-Amu executive produced in early 2017. The film hit number 2 in the UK iTunes charts and number 5 in the United States and Germany. The film had its world premiere in Tribeca having been selected from over 6,000 films. It won a British Independent Film Award, Best Sci-Fi and Best Actress at Toronto After Dark, three BAFTA Cymru awards including Best Film and Best UK Feature of the Raindance Film Festival and winning the Screen Award for UK distribution which was also managed by Giwa-Amu.

John was involved in the co-production of the film, The Silent Storm, starring Damien Lewis and Andrea Riseborough, which was released in cinemas in May 2016 by Sony.

In 2016, Giwa-Amu produced Don't Knock Twice which was again directed by James, starring Katee Sackhoff, Lucy Boynton, Nick Moran, Javier Botet and Richard Mylan.

In 2017, Giwa-Amu executive produced The Party, by Sally Potter, starring Cillian Murphy, Timothy Spall, Kristin Scott Thomas, Bruno Ganz and, Patricia Clarkson. The film premiered in Berlinale 2017. It was awarded the Guild Prize at the 67th Berlin International Film Festival. He would again work with Potter on the 2020 film, The Roads Not Taken, starring Javier Bardem, Elle Fanning, Laura Linney, and Salma Hayek.

Giwa-Amu found further success when he developed and distributed a video game adaptation of Don't Knock Twice. This led to the foundation of his interactive company, Good Gate Media. The company's debut, The Complex, was released in 2020 across PlayStation, Xbox, Nintendo, and Steam. Since its debut, Good Gate Media has developed and published eight more games of multiple genres, including Five Dates, Night Book, Bloodshore, and the upcoming Who Pressed Mute on Uncle Marcus?

In 2021, Giwa-Amu produced Count Me In, a music documentary that explores drummers and their careers. The documentary features Taylor Hawkins (Foo Fighters), Cindy Blackman (Santana), Nick Mason (Pink Floyd), Chad Smith (Red Hot Chili Peppers), Roger Taylor (Queen), and many other drummers. Count Me In was released worldwide by Netflix.

In 2024, Giwa-Amu produced The Man In My Basement, based on Walter Mosley's novel and starring Academy Award nominee Willem Dafoe and Tony Award nominated Corey Hawkins. The film premiered at the 2025 Toronto International Film Festival.

In 2025, Giwa-Amu co-produced H Is For Hawk, based on Helen Mcdonald's New York Times best selling memoir, starring Claire Foy and Brendan Gleeson, directed by three-time BAFTA winner Philippa Lowthorpe. The film premiered at the 52nd Telluride Film Festival. The film was later nominated for the BAFTA Outstanding British Film award in 2026.

In 2026, Giwa-Amu produced Lady, a thriller feature backed by BFI and Film4. The film premiered at Sundance Film Festival, winning the Special Jury Award for Acting Ensemble.

== Member ==
Giwa-Amu sits on the board of Ffilm Cymru Wales and BAFTA Cymru.

== Filmography ==
- 2024 - The Man In My Basement
- 2017- The Party
- 2016- Don't Knock Twice
- 2016- The Call Up
- 2014- The Silent Storm
- 2013- The Machine
- 2006- Little White Lies
