= Pooneh Hajimohammadi =

Iranian actress

- پونه حاج‌محمدی
- Born: Iran
- Occupation: Actress
- Years active: 2010–present

Pooneh Hajimohammadi (Persian: پونه حاج‌محمدی) is an Iranian stage, television and film actress who has appeared in films and television in Iran and the United Kingdom.

== Biography ==
Hajimohammadi was born in Iran and began her career in Iran in TV shows including Khane Dar Tariki and Mazrae Kochak, and the feature film Aroosak Farangi.

After moving to the U.K. she appeared in The Bill, The Machine and Words with Gods.

== Filmography ==
=== Film ===
Year	Title	Role	Notes
2013	The Machine	Suri	
2014	Words with Gods	Shadya	
2016	Don't Knock Twice	Tira	
2022	A fleeting encounter	Marjan	
