= List of artificial intelligence films =

This article contains a chronological list of notable films which included artificial intelligence either as a protagonist, antagonist or as an essential part of the film.

== 1920s-1960s ==
Year	Title	Country	Artificial intelligence names	Computer or program	Robot or android	Ref
1927	Metropolis	Germany	Maschinenmensch		check	
1934	Der Herr der Welt (i.e. Master of the World)	Germany	Überroboter / Kampfmaschine (i.e. fighting machine), working-robots		check	
1935	Loss of Sensation	USSR			check	
1951	The Day the Earth Stood Still	USA	Gort		check	
1957	Desk Set	USA	EMERAC/"Emmy"	check		
1957	The Invisible Boy	USA	Robby the Robot	check	check	
1962	The Creation of the Humanoids	USA		check	check	
1965	Alphaville	France	Alpha 60	check		
1968	2001: A Space Odyssey	UK / USA	HAL 9000	check		

== 1970s ==
Year	Title	Country	Artificial intelligence names	Computer or program	Robot or android	Ref
1970	Colossus: The Forbin Project	USA	Colossus, Guardian	check		
1971	Paper Man	USA	Henry Norman	check	check	
1972	Silent Running	USA	Huey, Dewey and Louie		check	
1973	Westworld	USA		check	check	
1974	The Questor Tapes	USA	Questor		check	
1974	Dark Star	USA	Ship Computer, Bomb #20	check		
1974	Godzilla vs. Mechagodzilla	Japan	Mechagodzilla		check	
1974	Zardoz	USA / UK / Ireland	Tabernacle	check		
1975	The Stepford Wives	USA			check	
1975	Terror of Mechagodzilla	Japan	Mechagodzilla		check	
1976	Logan's Run	USA	City Computer, Box	check	check	
1977	Demon Seed	USA	Proteus IV	check		
1977	Star Wars	USA	R2-D2, C-3PO		check	
1979	Star Trek: The Motion Picture	USA	V'Ger, Ilia probe		check	
1979	Alien	UK / USA	Mother (computer), Ash (android)	check	check	
1979	The Black Hole	USA	V.I.N.CENT., BO.B, Maximilian, sentry robots		check	

== 1980s ==
Year	Title	Country	Artificial intelligence names	Computer or program	Robot or android	Ref
1980	Saturn 3	UK	Hector		check	
1982	Blade Runner	USA	Replicants		check	
1982	Airplane II	USA	ROK	check		
1982	Tron	USA	Master Control Program	check		
1982	Android	USA				
1983	Superman III	USA	Supercomputer	check	check	
1983	WarGames	USA	WOPR (War Operation Plan Response), Joshua	check		
1984	Electric Dreams	USA / UK	Edgar	check		
1984	Hide and Seek	Canada	P-1	check		
1984	The Terminator	USA	Skynet, the Terminator	check	check	
1984	2010: The Year We Make Contact	USA	HAL 9000, SAL 9000	check		
1985	D.A.R.Y.L.	USA	Daryl	check	check	
1986	Annihilator	USA	AI robots		check	
1986	Flight of the Navigator	USA / Norway	Spaceship	check	check	
1986	Short Circuit	USA	Number 5/Johnny Five		check	
1986	Aliens	USA	Bishop		check	
1986	Deadly Friend	USA	BB, Samantha Pringle	check	check	
1987	RoboCop	USA	RoboCop/Murphy		check	
1988	Short Circuit 2	USA	Johnny Five		check	
1989	Gunhed	Japan	Gunhed, Kyron-5	check	check	

== 1990s ==
Year	Title	Country	Artificial intelligence names	Computer or program	Robot or android	Ref
1990	Class of 1999	USA	AI robots		check	
1990	RoboCop 2	USA	RoboCop/Murphy, RoboCop 2		check	
1991	Terminator 2: Judgment Day	USA	Skynet, T-800, T-1000	check	check	
1991	Zeiram	Japan	Bob	check		
1991	Godzilla vs. King Ghidorah	Japan	Mecha-King Ghidorah	check	check	
1992	Homewrecker	USA	Lucy	check	check	
1993	RoboCop 3	USA	RoboCop/Murphy, Otomo		check	
1993	Godzilla vs. Mechagodzilla II	Japan	Mechagodzilla		check	
1994	Star Trek Generations	USA	Data	check	check	
1994	Blankman	USA	J-5		check	
1994	Zeiram 2	Japan	Bob	check		
1994	Godzilla vs. SpaceGodzilla	Japan	MOGUERA		check	
1995	Ghost in the Shell	Japan	The Puppet Master	check		
1995	Mighty Morphin Power Rangers: The Movie	USA	Alpha 5, Zordon, Zords	check	check	
1995	Screamers	USA / Canada	David Screamer / Jessica Hansen Screamer	check		
1995	Virtuosity	USA	SID 6.7	check		
1996	Star Trek: First Contact	USA	Data, The Borg		check	
1997	Nirvana	Italy / France	Solo	check		
1997	Austin Powers: International Man of Mystery	USA	Fembots		check	
1997	Alien Resurrection	USA	Call		check	
1998	Lost in Space	USA	Robot	check	check	
1998	Small Soldiers	USA	Chip Hazard, Commando Elite, Archer, Gorgonites	check	check	
1998	Star Trek: Insurrection	USA	Data		check	
1999	The Iron Giant	USA			check	
1999	The Matrix	USA	Agents, Sentinels	check	check	
1999	Bicentennial Man	USA	Andrew Martin		check	
1999	Star Wars: Episode I – The Phantom Menace	USA	battle droids, C-3PO and R2-D2		check	
1999	Smart House	USA	PAT	check		

== 2000s ==
Year	Title	Country	Artificial intelligence names	Computer or program	Robot or android	Ref
2001	A.I. Artificial Intelligence	USA	David, Gigolo Joe, Teddy		check	
2001	Jimmy Neutron: Boy Genius	USA	Goddard		check	
2002	The Time Machine	USA	Vox 114	check		
2002	Star Wars: Episode II – Attack of the Clones	USA	battle droids, C-3PO and R2-D2		check	
2002	Resident Evil	UK / Germany	Red Queen	check		
2002	S1M0NE	USA	Simone	check	check	
2002	Minority Report	USA	cyber parlor rooms	check		
2002	Star Trek: Nemesis	USA	Data, B-4		check	
2002	Godzilla Against Mechagodzilla	Japan	Mechagodzilla, Kiryu	check	check	
2003	The Matrix Reloaded	USA	Agents, Sentinels	check	check	
2003	Terminator 3: Rise of the Machines	USA	Skynet, the Terminator, T-X	check	check	
2003	The Matrix Revolutions	USA	Agents, Sentinels	check	check	
2003	Godzilla: Tokyo S.O.S.	Japan	Mechagodzilla, Kiryu	check	check	
2004	I, Robot	USA	VIKI (Virtual Interactive Kinetic Intelligence), Sonny	check	check	
2004	Team America: World Police	USA	I.N.T.E.L.L.I.G.E.N.C.E.	check		
2005	The Hitchhiker's Guide to the Galaxy	USA	Marvin the Paranoid Android, Deep Thought, Eddie the Computer	check	check	
2005	Star Wars: Episode III – Revenge of the Sith	USA	Battle droids, C-3PO and R2-D2		check	
2005	Stealth	USA	EDI	check		
2007	Resident Evil: Extinction	Various	White Queen	check		
2007	Meet the Robinsons	USA	DOR-15 and Carl		check	
2008	Eagle Eye	USA	Autonomous Reconnaissance Intelligence Integration Analyst (ARIIA)	check		
2008	Iron Man	USA	J.A.R.V.I.S. (Just A Rather Very Intelligent System)	check		
2008	WALL-E	USA	WALL-E, EVE, AUTO, Ship's Computer	check	check	
2008	The Day the Earth Stood Still (2008 film)	USA	Gort		check	
2009	Terminator Salvation	USA	Skynet, the Terminator	check	check	
2009	Echelon Conspiracy	USA	Echelon, an omniscient communication surveillance computer system	check		
2009	Moon	UK	GERTY	check		

== 2010s ==
Year	Title	Country	Artificial intelligence names	Computer or program	Robot or android	Ref
2010	Iron Man 2	USA	J.A.R.V.I.S.	check		
2010	Enthiran	India	Chitti		check	
2010	Tron: Legacy	USA	Clu 2.0, Quorra, other programs	check		
2011	Eva	Spain / Switzerland	Eva, Max, SI-9		check	
2011	Real Steel	USA	Atom		check	
2011	Ra.One	India	Ra.One, G.One	check	check	
2012	The Avengers	USA	J.A.R.V.I.S.	check		
2012	Prometheus	USA	David		check	
2012	Resident Evil: Retribution	UK / Germany / France / USA / Canada	Red Queen	check		
2012	Robot & Frank	USA	Robot		check	
2012	Total Recall	USA			check	
2013	Her	USA	Samantha	check		
2013	Iron Man 3	USA	J.A.R.V.I.S., Iron Legion	check	check	
2013	The Machine	UK	Machine		check	
2013	Pacific Rim	USA	A.I., Jaegers	check	check	
2013	Elysium	USA	Elysium robots		check	
2013	Oblivion	USA	Tet	check		
2014	Autómata	Spain / Bulgaria			check	
2014	Big Hero 6	USA	Baymax		check	
2014	Interstellar	USA	TARS and CASE		check	
2014	Robocop (2014 film)	USA	RoboCop/Murphy		check	
2014	Transcendence	USA	Dr. Will Caster	check		
2014	X-Men: Days of Future Past	USA	Sentinels		check	
2015	Ex Machina	UK	Ava		check	
2015	Chappie	USA	Chappie		check	
2015	Tomorrowland	USA	Athena and other robots		check	
2015	Avengers: Age of Ultron	USA	Iron Legion, Veronica, Hulkbuster, Ultron, J.A.R.V.I.S., F.R.I.D.A.Y. (Female Replacement Intelligent Digital Assistant Youth), Vision (formerly J.A.R.V.I.S.)	check	check	
2015	Terminator Genisys, aka Terminator 5	USA	T-800, T-1000, T-3000, Skynet, Genisys	check	check	
2015	Star Wars: The Force Awakens	USA	BB-8, C-3PO and R2-D2		check	
2015	Uncanny	USA	Kressen	check	check	
2015	Psycho-pass: The Movie	Japan	Sibyl System	check	check	
2016	Captain America: Civil War	USA	F.R.I.D.A.Y., Vision	check	check	
2016	Max Steel	USA	Steel		check	
2016	Morgan	USA	Morgan, Lee Weathers		check	
2016	Resident Evil: The Final Chapter	UK / Germany / France / USA / Canada / Australia	Red Queen	check		
2016	Rogue One: A Star Wars Story	USA	K-2SO		check	
2016	Infinity Chamber	USA	Howard	check		
2016	Passengers (2016 film)	USA	Ship androids	check	check	
2016	Kill Command	UK	S.A.R.		check	
2016	Why Him?	USA	Justine	check		
2017	Sword Art Online The Movie: Ordinal Scale	Japan	Yui, Yuna	check		
2017	Power Rangers	USA	Alpha 5, Zordon, Zords	check	check	
2017	Spider-Man: Homecoming	USA	Karen, F.R.I.D.A.Y.	check		
2017	Alien: Covenant	USA	David, Walter		check	
2017	Blade Runner 2049	USA	Replicants, Joi		check	
2017	Star Wars: The Last Jedi	USA	BB-8, C-3PO and R2-D2		check	
2017	Singularity	Switzerland / USA	Kronos	check		
2018	Upgrade	Australia	Stem	check		
2018	Zoe	USA	Ash		check	
2018	Ready Player One	USA	The Iron Giant, Mechagodzilla	check	check	
2018	Tau	USA	Tau	check		
2018	Avengers: Infinity War	USA	F.R.I.D.A.Y., Vision	check	check	
2018	2036 Origin Unknown	UK	ARTI	check		
2018	Extinction	USA	Synths		check	
2018	Maniac	USA	GRTA	check		
2018	2.0	India	Chitti and Chitti version 2.0		check	
2018	A-X-L	USA	A-X-L		check	
2018	A.I. Rising	USA	Nimani			
2018	Replicas	USA			check	
2019	Alita: Battle Angel	USA	Alita and others		check	
2019	Serenity	USA	The Plymouth island inhabitants	check		
2019	Hi, A.I.	Germany		Documentary		
2019	Captain Marvel	USA	The Supreme Intelligence	check		
2019	Avengers: Endgame	USA	F.R.I.D.A.Y.	check		
2019	The Wandering Earth	China	MOSS	check		
2019	I Am Mother	USA / Australia	Mother	check	check	
2019	Terminator: Dark Fate	USA	T-800, Rev-9, Legion	check	check	
2019	iHuman	Norway		check		
2019	Machine	Australia		check	check	
2019	Jexi	USA	Jexi	check		
2019	Star Wars: The Rise of Skywalker	USA	BB-8, C-3PO, R2-D2, D-O		check	

== 2020s ==
Year	Title	Country	Artificial intelligence names	Computer or program	Robot or android	Ref
2020	Blood Machines	France				
2020	Bloodshot	USA				
2020	Monsters of Man	USA			check	
2020	Superintelligence	USA	Superintelligence	check		
2020	Archive	UK	J1, J2, J3		check	
2020	2067	Australia				
2020	We Need to Talk About A.I.	USA		Documentary		
2020	Coded Bias	USA		Documentary		
2020	Invasion	Russia	Sol		check	
2021	After Yang	USA	Yang		check	
2021	Finch	USA	Jeff		check	
2021	Free Guy	USA	Guy	check		
2021	Godzilla vs. Kong	USA	Mechagodzilla		check	
2021	Ron's Gone Wrong	UK / USA		check	check	
2021	The Matrix: Resurrections	USA		check	check	
2021	Mother/Android	USA			check	
2021	I'm Your Man	Germany	Tom		check	
2022	Je Suis Auto	Austria	Auto	check		
2022	Margaux	USA	Margaux	check		
2022	Moonfall	USA / China / UK / Canada				
2022	Brian and Charles	UK	Charles Petrescu		check	
2022	Big Bug	France		check	check	
2022	Kimi	USA	Kimi	check		
2022	The Artifice Girl	USA	Cherry	check	check	
2023	M3GAN	USA	M3GAN	check	check	
2023	JUNG_E	South Korea	JUNG_E		check	
2023	Operation Fortune: Ruse de Guerre	USA / UK / China / Indonesia / Turkey	The Handle			
2023	Heart of Stone	USA	The heart			
2023	Simulant	Canada	Evan	check	check	
2023	Mission: Impossible – Dead Reckoning Part One	USA	The Entity	check		
2023	The Creator	USA	Alphie, simulants	check	check	
2023	Rebel Moon – Part One	USA	Jimmy			
2023	The Beast	France / Canada				
2024	Teri Baaton Mein Aisa Uljha Jiya	India	SIFRA (Super Intelligent Female Robot Automation)		check	
2024	Subservience	USA	Alice			
2024	Rebel Moon – Part Two	USA	Jimmy			
2024	Bade Miyan Chote Miyan	India				
2024	Atlas	USA				
2024	Alien: Romulus	USA	Andy, Rook		check	
2024	Afraid	USA	AIA			
2024	Kalki 2898 AD	India	BU-JZ-1 alias Bujji	check	check	
2024	The Last Screenwriter	Switzerland		check		
2025	Mission: Impossible – The Final Reckoning	USA	The Entity	check		
2025	M3GAN 2.0	USA	M3GAN		check	
2025	Tron: Ares	USA	Ares, Athena, other programs	check	check	
2025	Companion	USA	Iris		check	
2025	Renner	USA				
2025	Superman (2025)	USA	Superman robots		check	
2025	Predator: Badlands	USA	Android Thea			
2025	Dog 51	France				
2025	The Residence	France / Belgium				
2025	C.O.G. (originally CognAItive)	USA	C.O.G.			
2026	Mercy	USA	Maddox			
2026	Good Luck, Have Fun, Don't Die	USA		check		
2026	Toy Story 5	USA	Lilypad	check		
2026	Hoppers	USA				
2026	Scream 7	USA				
2026	The AI Doc: Or How I Became an Apocaloptimist	USA				
2026	The Taken: Chapter One – The Arrival	India				
2026	O Horizon	USA				
2026	Klara and the Sun	USA	Klara		check	
2026	Soulm8te	USA				
2026	Paradise Lost	South Korea	Sun-woo	check		
2026	Artificial	USA	ChatGPT			

== See also ==
- Artificial intelligence in fiction
