= Kirsty Besterman =

British actress (born 1980)

- Born: 1980 (age 45–46)
- Education: Royal Academy of Dramatic Art graduating in 2002
- Occupation: actress

Kirsty Besterman (born 1980) is a British actress of the stage and screen. She trained at the Royal Academy of Dramatic Art graduating in 2002.

== Filmography ==
=== Film ===
Year	Title	Role	Notes
2006	An American Nobody in London	Isabelle	
2007	Supermarket Sam	Jenny	Short
2015	Chicken	Mrs. Rickson	
2018	A.I. Rising	Computer	
2021	Rupture	Ruby	

=== Television ===
Year	Title	Role	Notes
2004	Doctors	Jackie	Episode: "Hidden Harm"
2009	Doctors	Carla Mayhew	Episode: "Gone to the Dogs"
2010	Foyle's War	Caroline Devereaux	Episode: "The Hide"
2011	Doctors	Becky Garland	Episode: "The Lonely Woman"
2014	Silent Witness	Amy Nash	Episode: "Fraternity"
2015	Father Brown	Julia Flanders	Episode: "The Paradise of Thieves"
2017	Holby City	Claire Hatbridge	Episode: "Wildest Dreams"
2020	Doctor Who	Solpado	Episode: "The Timeless Children"
2020	His Dark Materials	Sam Cansino	Episode: "Theft"
2022	Grantchester	Melanie Carmichael	Series 7, Episode 2
2022	Top Boy	Home office official	Series 4, Episode 5
2022	Professor T. (British TV series)	Defence Counsel	Series 2, Episode 5
2023	Vigil (TV series)	Intelligence officer Wright	Series 2, Episode 5
2025	The Sandman (TV series)	Queen Elizabeth	Series 2, Episode 1

=== Theatre ===
- "Arcadia" (English Touring Theatre)
- "Separate Tables" (Salisbury Playhouse)
- "Tonight at 8.30" (English Touring Theatre)
- "Private Lives" (Royal Lyceum Edinburgh)
- "Playhouse Creatures" (Chichester Theatre)
- "Foxfinder" (Finborough Theatre)
- "The Importance of Being Earnest" (The Rose Theatre Kingston)
- "Amy's View" (Nottingham Playhouse)
- Plunder (Watermill Theatre)
- The Rivals (Theatre Royal, Bath)
- Othello (Cheek by Jowl), as Bianca.
- King Lear (RSC Academy), as Cordelia.
- Holding Fire! (Shakespeare's Globe).
- The Merchant of Venice (Shakespeare's Globe), as Portia.
- Macbeth (National Theatre tour), as Lady Macbeth.
- Habeas Corpus (play) (Menier Chocolate Factory) as Connie.
- The Party Girls (Marlowe Theatre) as Nancy Mitford.

She has also appeared in Peter Ackroyd's London and Doctors on BBC television, and Dragon Age: Inquisition when it comes to video games.
