= Dawn (2014 film) =

- Directed by: Romed Wyder
- Written by: Billy MacKinnon
- Based on: Dawn by Elie Wiesel
- Produced by: Samir; Tunje Berns; Romed Wyder; Philip Gates; Richard West; Amir Harel; Clarens Grollmann
- Starring: Joel Basman; Liron Levo; Moris Cohen; Rami Heuberger; Sarah Adler; Jason Isaacs
- Cinematography: Ram Shweky
- Edited by: Kathrin Plüss
- Music by: Bernard Trontin
- Release date: 29 April 2015 (Switzerland)
- Running time: 95 minutes
- Countries: Switzerland; United Kingdom; Germany; Israel
- Languages: French, English, Hebrew

Dawn (French: L'Aube; German: Morgengrauen; Hebrew: שחר) is a 2014 drama film directed by Romed Wyder, written by Billy MacKinnon, and based on the novel Dawn by Elie Wiesel. It is set in Palestine in1947. The film was screened at several international film festivals.

== Synopsis ==
In 1947, during the British Mandate in Palestine, a Jewish underground group holds a British officer captive in an attempt to stop the execution of one of its members. While they wait for news, Elisha is pressured to carry out the threatened reprisal.

== Cast ==
The cast includes:

- Joel Basman as Elisha
- Liron Levo as Gad
- Moris Cohen as Joab
- Rami Heuberger as Gideon
- Sarah Adler as Ilana
- Jason Isaacs as Dawson

== Background ==
Wyder said the material had interested him for some time. After his 2004 film Absolut, he wanted to continue working with the theme of resistance. He was also interested in the Israeli-Palestinian conflict and in the events from 1947 and 1948 that he felt were not widely known.

== Production ==
Joel Basman was cast in the role because Romed Wyder was looking for a young Swiss actor who spoke Hebrew.

== Reception ==
Filmdienst described Dawn as a psychological chamber drama adapted from Elie Wiesel’s novel. SRF wrote that it combines historical realism with moral debate, but found the ending too simple. It praised the acting and filmmaking. Swissinfo said that the indoor setting mades the film feel tense and called it a universal moral drama.

== Festival screenings ==
The film premiered in January 2014. It was later screened at festivals including the Solothurn Film Festival in 2014 and the Miami Jewish Film Festival, the Palm Beach International Film Festival, and the Chelsea Film Festival in 2015.

== See also ==
- Dawn (1985)
