= Romed Wyder =

Swiss filmmaker (born 1967)

Romed Wyder (born 1967) is a Swiss filmmaker. He has been established in Geneva since 1989.

== Biography ==
Romed Wyder was born in 1967 in Brig-Glis, Valais, Switzerland. In 1995, he graduated with a degree from the cinema department of the Geneva University of Art and Design (HEAD) (formerly École Supérieure des Beaux-Arts, Genève).

He is a former member of the Cinéma Spoutnik and founded Laika Films with five other filmmakers in 1993. Romed developed a tape to film system and an online widget generator. He founded Paradigma Films SA in 2003. During 12 years he was a member of the Federal Film Commission. Between 2005 and 2008 he was the president of the Swiss Filmmakers Association and is currently a member of the Board of Trustees of Swiss Films and of the executive committee of the Swiss Film Academy. He works as director, producer and screenwriter since 1990.

== Filmography ==
- Laterna Magica directed by Séverine Barde; created by Dorian Rossel, produced by Romed Wyder (2025, docu-fiction, 59 min, DCP)
- A fleeting encounter (Une histoire provisoire) directed by Romed Wyder; written by Nasim Ahmadpour and Romed Wyder, produced by Romed Wyder, Cyrill Gerber, Bady Minck, Alexander Dummreicher-Ivanceanu (2022, fiction, 85 min, DCP)
- Et Israël fut... directed and written by Romed Wyder; produced by Yasmine Abd El Aziz and Romed Wyder (2018, documentary, 52 min, DCP)
- Dawn directed by Romed Wyder; written by Billy MacKinnon; based on a novel by Elie Wiesel; produced by Samir and Romed Wyder (2014, fiction, 95 min, DCP)
- Ménagerie intérieure directed by Nadège de Benoit-Luthy, written by Nadège de Benoit Luthy and Nicole Borgeat, produced by Romed Wyder (2007, fiction, 18 min, 35mm)
- Absolut directed and produced by Romed Wyder, written by Romed Wyder, Yves Mugny and Maria Watzlawick (2004, fiction, 94 min, 35mm)
- Pas de café, pas de télé, pas de sexe directed and produced by Romed Wyder, written by Romed Wyder and Maria Watzlawick (1999, fiction, 87 min, 35mm)
- Écran d’argile directed, written and produced by Romed Wyder and Maria Watzlawick (1997, documentary, 53 min, 16mm)
- Excursion directed, written and produced by Romed Wyder (1996, fiction, 21 min, 35mm)
- Squatters directed, written and produced by Romed Wyder (1995, documentary, 70+55 min, 16mm)
- November am Meer directed, written and produced by Romed Wyder (1992, fiction, 5 min, 16mm
