= Mikke Levo =

Finnish ice hockey player

- Born: March 28, 1995 (age 29); Orivesi, Finland
- Height: 6 ft 0 in (183 cm)
- Weight: 168 lb (76 kg; 12 st 0 lb)
- Position: Defence
- Shoots: Left
- Liiga team: Ilves
- NHL draft: Undrafted
- Playing career: 2013–present

Mikke Levo (born March 28, 1995) is a Finnish ice hockey defenceman. His is currently playing with Ilves in the Finnish Liiga.

Levo made his Liiga debut playing with Ilves during the 2013–14 Liiga season.
