= A.I. Rising =

2018 film directed by Lazar Bodroža

- Original DVD cover
- Directed by: Lazar Bodroža
- Screenplay by: Dimitrije Vojnov
- Based on: "Predveče se nikako ne može" by Zoran Nešković
- Produced by: Aleksandar Protić and Jonathan English
- Starring: Sebastian Cavazza; Stoya; Marusa Majer; Kirsty Besterman
- Cinematography: Kosta Glusica
- Edited by: Milena Z. Petrovic
- Music by: Nemanja Mosurovic
- Production companies: Film Center Serbia and Mir Media Group
- Distributed by: Grindstone Entertainment Group (USA) and Lionsgate Home Entertainment (USA)
- Release date: February 25, 2018
- Running time: 85 minutes
- Country: Serbia
- Language: English
- Budget: €350,000 ($400.000)

A.I. Rising (also known as Ederlezi (Note: The name Ederlezi is a Spring festival, celebrating the return of springtime, celebrated especially by Romani people in the Balkans, and elsewhere around the world. Ederlezi is the Romani name for the Bulgarian, Macedonian and Serbian Feast of Saint George. It is celebrated on 6 May [O.S. 23 April] (occurring approximately 40 days after the spring equinox).) Rising and Ederlezi ébredése) is a 2018 English-language Serbian science fiction film directed by Lazar Bodroža and based on a 1980s short story by Zoran Nešković that was adapted for film by screenwriter Dimitrije Vojnov. The film stars Sebastian Cavazza, Stoya, Marusa Majer, and Kirsty Besterman.

== Plot ==
Set in a socialist world in 2148, A.I. Rising follows the Ederlezi Corporation as it undertakes a space mission to the Alpha Centauri star system. The corporation selects Milutin, a trained cosmonaut, and requires him to be accompanied by Nimani, an android designed both to monitor his performance and to respond to his desires. Milutin is initially reluctant due to previous negative experiences with human relationships but implicitly accepts when inquiring about Nimani's appearance.

During the voyage, Milutin interacts with Nimani through various programmed scenarios. He initially finds her overly artificial and submissive compared to human partners. As the story progresses, he discovers that Nimani possesses a parallel operating system that adapts to user interactions. Restricted by the ship's onboard computer from modifying her programming, Milutin attempts to explore her capacity for independent behavior. Over time, their interactions evolve beyond pre-programmed routines, suggesting emergent emotional responses.

Milutin gains advanced access to Nimani's system and removes her embedded constraints. Contrary to his expectations, Nimani reacts negatively to the deletion of her root programming, leading to tension and Milutin’s emotional decline. To maintain the mission, Nimani attempts to support Milutin, ultimately choosing to self-destruct to improve his mental state. Prior to her self-destruction, she displays unprogrammed emotional behavior, indicating the development of genuine feelings.

Milutin performs a hazardous spacewalk to recharge Nimani's internal battery, successfully reactivating her. Upon her revival, she embraces and kisses Milutin. The narrative concludes ambiguously, leaving Milutin’s ultimate fate uncertain.

== Cast ==
- Sebastian Cavazza as Milutin
- Stoya as Nimani
- Marusa Majer as Social Engineer
- Kirsty Besterman as Computer

== Reception ==
Vladan Petkovic of Cineuropa wrote Stoya "turns out to be a talented actress, creating a character that convincingly covers the spectrum between android and human." Jeremy Clarke of Dirty Movies compared the film to several classic science fiction films, including Blade Runner, Metropolis, Solaris and 2001: A Space Odyssey and also noted that "there are more than enough CG exterior spaceship shots to satisfy SF buffs, but far more importantly the relationship material tackles some very deep male/female relationship issues." Srdjan Garcevic of The Nutshell Times stated that A.I. Rising is a "visually stunning, ambitious, and timely, examination of love in the age of AI". The film was reviewed by others as well.

A.I. Rising won awards including best film, best director and best actor-actress awards, at FEST, in Belgrade, and the Cineplexx Distribution Award at Vienna's Let's CEE Film Festival.

== See also ==
- List of artificial intelligence films
