= List of Romanian Nobel laureates and nominees =

As of 2023, Romania has produced four Nobel laureates in the fields of Chemistry, Physiology or Medicine, Literature and Nobel Peace Prize.

== Laureates ==
Year	Image	Laureate	Born	Died	Field	Citation
Citizens
1974		George Emil Palade	19 November 1912 in Iași, Romania	8 October 2008 in Del Mar, California, United States	Physiology or Medicine	"for their discoveries concerning the structural and functional organization of the cell." (shared with American-Belgian cell biologist Albert Claude and Belgian biochemist Christian de Duve)
1986		Eliezer "Elie" Wiesel	30 September 1928 in Sighetu Marmației, Maramureș, Romania	2 July 2016 in Manhattan, New York, United States	Peace	"for being a messenger to mankind: his message is one of peace, atonement and dignity."
2009		Herta Müller	17 August 1953 in Nițchidorf, Timiș, Romania	—N/a	Literature	"who, with the concentration of poetry and the frankness of prose, depicts the landscape of the dispossessed."
2014		Stefan Walter Hell	23 December 1962 in Arad, Romania	—N/a	Chemistry	"for the development of super-resolved fluorescence microscopy." (shared with American physicist Eric Betzig and physical chemist William E. Moerner)
Expatriates
1907		Eduard Buchner	20 May 1860 in Munich, Bavaria, Germany	13 August 1917 in Focșani, Vrancea, Romania	Chemistry	"for his biochemical researches and his discovery of cell-free fermentation."

== Nominations ==
Image	Nominee	Born	Died	Years Nominated	Citation	Nominator(s)
Physics
	Hermann Julius Oberth	25 June 1894 in Sibiu, Transylvania, Kingdom of Hungary.	28 December 1989 in Nuremberg, Bavaria, Germany	1967 (Note: Oberth was nominated as a choice for the 1967 Nobel Prize in Physics along with Murray Gell-Mann, Kazuhiko Nishijima, Marvin Leonard Goldberger, Nikolay Bogolyubov, Geoffrey Chew, Isaak Pomeranchuk, Louis Leprince-Ringuet, Cormac Ó Ceallaigh, George Rochester, Clifford Charles Butler, Chien-Shiung Wu, James Van Allen, Tullio Regge, Gerhart Lüders, Rafael Armenteros, and Gordon Thompson Danby.)	"for contributions to astronautics and rocketry, and discovering the effect for fuel-saving maneuvers in interplanetary space flights (Oberth effect)."	Ferdinand Cap (1924–2016); Austria
Chemistry
	Costin Nenițescu	15 July 1902 in Bucharest, Romania	28 July 1970 in Bușteni, Prahova, Romania	1969 (Note: Nenițescu was nominated jointly for the 1969 Nobel Prize in Chemistry with Rowland Pettit and Rudolf Criegee by Paul Doughty Bartlett, professor of chemistry at Harvard University.)	"for discovering two new syntheses for the indole nucleus, and a new method of polymerisation of ethylene.	Paul Doughty Bartlett (1907–1997); United States
Physiology or Medicine
	Victor Babeș	28 July 1854 in Vienna, Austria	19 October 1926 in Bucharest, Romania	1914 (Note: Nomination was declared invalid by the Nobel Committee.)	"for work on pathological anatomy, and the discovery of the first piroplasmosis."	Mihail Manicatide (1867–1954); Romania
	Victor Babeș	28 July 1854 in Vienna, Austria	19 October 1926 in Bucharest, Romania	1924	"for work on the pathological anatomy, symptomatology, prophylaxis and treatment of pellagra."	Gheorghe Marinescu et al. (Note: Other nominators of V. Babeș in 1924 included Constantin Daniel (1876–1973), G. Stoicescu (?), Ion Nanu-Muscel (1862–1938), Mina Minovici (1858–1933), Nicolae Mețianu (1881–1965), Anibal Theohari (1873–1933), Dimitrie Gerota (1867–1939), Alexandru Obregia (1860–1937), Ștefan S. Nicolau (1896–1967), Ernest Juvara (1870–1930), Mihail Manicatide (1867–1954), and D. Manolescu (?), all from Romania.) (1863–1938); Romania
	Constantin Levaditi	1 August 1874 in Galați, Romania	5 September 1953 in Paris, France	1922	"for work on the virus of poliomyelitis, influenza and sleeping sickness."	Richard Bruynoghe (1881–1957); Belgium
	Constantin Levaditi	1 August 1874 in Galați, Romania	5 September 1953 in Paris, France	1924	"for work on experimental syphilis."	João de Aguiar Pupo (1890–1980); Brazil
	Constantin Levaditi	1 August 1874 in Galați, Romania	5 September 1953 in Paris, France	1927	"for discovery of new chemical treatments for syphilis, and of a new method for the prevention of the disease."	Germund Wirgin (1868–1939); Sweden
	Constantin Levaditi	1 August 1874 in Galați, Romania	5 September 1953 in Paris, France	1930	"for work on metallotherapy in the treatment of spirochet diseases, and work on the use of bismuth and stovarsol in the treatment of syphilis."	Jean Lépine et al. (Note: Other nominators of Levaditi in 1930 included Erich Hoffmann (1868–1959) of Germany, Germund Wirgin (1868–1939) of Sweden, Émile Roux (1853–1933) of France and Carl Kling (1879–1967) of Sweden.) (1876–1967); France
	Constantin Levaditi	1 August 1874 in Galați, Romania	5 September 1953 in Paris, France	1931	"for work on the prophylactic and therapeutic effects of metals, especially bismuth, in the treatment of syphilis, and the conditions at which their pharmacodynamic effects arise."	Israel Holmgren et al. (Note: Other nominators of Levaditi in 1931 included Jules Guiart (1870–1965) of France, George Raiziss (?) of the United States, Germund Wirgin (1868–1939) of Sweden, and Carl Kling (1879–1967) of Sweden, W. Scholtz (?) of Germany, Nicolae Minovici (1868–1941), Iuliu Hațieganu (1885–1959), Dimitrie Negru (1883–1955), Victor Papilian (1920–1982), C. Grigoriu (?), P. Thomas (?), J. Moldovan (?), J. Jacobovici (?), C. Urechia (?), J. Minea (?), T. Gane (?), T. Vasiliu (?), J. Nițescu (?) and D. Mihail (?), all from Romania.) (1871–1961); Sweden
	Constantin Levaditi	1 August 1874 in Galați, Romania	5 September 1953 in Paris, France	1932	"for work on chemotherapy, and work on bismuth therapy against syphilis and syphilis prevention."	Karl Landsteiner et al. (Note: Other nominators of Levaditi in 1932 included Ernest Fourneau (1872–1949) of France, Johan Almkvist (1869–1945) of Sweden, Israel Holmgren (1871–1961) of Sweden, Carl Kling (1879–1967) of Sweden and Germund Wirgin (1868–1939) of Sweden.) (1868–1943); Austria; United States
	Constantin Levaditi	1 August 1874 in Galați, Romania	5 September 1953 in Paris, France	1933	"Work on the prophylactic and therapeutic effect of bismuth on syphilis."	Carl Kling et al. (Note: Other nominators of Levaditi in 1933 included Germund Wirgin (1868–1939) of Sweden.) (1879–1967); Sweden
	Constantin Levaditi	1 August 1874 in Galați, Romania	5 September 1953 in Paris, France	1934	"for work on syphilis, especially on metallotherapy and metalloprophylaxis, and on treponema's states of latency."	Louis Spillman (1875–1940); France
	Constantin Levaditi	1 August 1874 in Galați, Romania	5 September 1953 in Paris, France	1935	"for work in the area of microbiology, Wassermann's reaction, the treatment of syphilis and the pathogenesis in tertiary syphilis."	Henri Gougerot (1881–1955); France
	Constantin Levaditi	1 August 1874 in Galați, Romania	5 September 1953 in Paris, France	1938	"for work on the use of bismuth in the therapy of syphilis."	Ștefan S. Nicolau (1896–1967); Romania
	Constantin Levaditi	1 August 1874 in Galați, Romania	5 September 1953 in Paris, France	1939	"for work on bacteriology, ultra virus, sulphanilamides and chemotherapy, particularly on the introduction of the use of bismuth in the treatment of syphilis."	René Le Blaye et al. (Note: Other nominators of Levaditi in 1939 included H. Vincent (?) and M. Roblin (?), both from France.) (1881–1941); France
	Thoma Ionescu	13 September 1860 in Ploiești, Prahova, Romania	28 March 1926 in Bucharest, Romania	1924	"for work on the anatomy, physiology and surgery of the neck and chest sympathicus."	Nicolae Paulescu et al. (Note: Other nominators of T. Ionescu in 1924 included D. Ionesco (?), I. Balacesco (?), A. Jiano (?), Ernest Juvara (1870–1930), Nicolae Gheorghiu (1867–1958), and D. Manolescu (?), all from Romania.) (1869–1931); Romania
	Ioan Cantacuzino	25 November 1863 in Bucharest, Romania	14 January 1934 in Bucharest, Romania	1933	"for work on immunity reaction on invertebrates and contact immunity."	E. Techoueyres el al. (Note: Other nominators of Cantacuzino in 1933 included J. Magrou (?), J. Bouillot (?), and J. Malassez (?), all from France.); France
Literature
	Alexandru Dimitrie Xenopol	23 March 1847 in Iași, Romania	27 February 1920 in Bucharest, Romania	1901, 1909	The History of the Romanians in Trajan's Dacia (1888–93); The Fundamental Principles of History (1899)	Ion Găvănescu (1859–1949); Romania
	Dezső Szabó	10 June 1879 in Cluj-Napoca, Cluj, Romania	13 January 1945 in Budapest, Hungary	1935 (Note: Nobel Prize in Literature has not been awarded this year.)	The Eroded Village (1919); Wonderful Life (1920); Resurrection in Makucska (1925)	Björn Collinder (1894–1983); Sweden
	Martha Bibescu	28 January 1886 in Bucharest, Romania	28 November 1973 in Paris, France	1956	The Green Parrot (1923); Isvor, Land of Willows (1924); Catherine-Paris (1927); At the Ball with Marcel Proust (1928)	Auguste-Armand de la Force et al. (Note: Other nominators of Bibescu in 1956 included Henri Davignon (1879–1964) of Belgium, Fernand Desonay (1899–1973) of Belgium and Marie-Jeanne Durry (1901–1980) of France.) (1878–1961); France
	Mircea Eliade	13 March 1907 in Bucharest, Romania	22 April 1986 in Chicago, Illinois, United States	1957	Bengal Nights (1933); Miss Christina (1936); Marriage in Heaven (1938); The Forbidden Forest (1955); The Forge and the Crucible (1956)	Ernest Koliqi (1903–1975); Albania
	Mircea Eliade	13 March 1907 in Bucharest, Romania	22 April 1986 in Chicago, Illinois, United States	1968	Bengal Nights (1933); Miss Christina (1936); Marriage in Heaven (1938); The Forbidden Forest (1955); The Forge and the Crucible (1956)	Stig Wikander (1908–1983); Sweden
	Paul Celan	23 November 1920 in Cernăuți, Romania (now Chernivtsi, Ukraine)	20 April 1970 in Paris, France	1964	The Sand from the Urns (1948); Poppy and Destiny (1952); From Threshold to Threshold (1955); The No-One's-Rose (1963); Breathturn (1967); Threadsuns (1968)	Hermann Bausinger et al. (Note: Other nominators of Celan in 1964 included Wilhelm Emrich (1909–1998) of Germany.) (1926–2021); Germany
	Paul Celan	23 November 1920 in Cernăuți, Romania (now Chernivtsi, Ukraine)	20 April 1970 in Paris, France	1966	The Sand from the Urns (1948); Poppy and Destiny (1952); From Threshold to Threshold (1955); The No-One's-Rose (1963); Breathturn (1967); Threadsuns (1968)	Henry Olsson (1896–1985); Sweden
	Paul Celan	23 November 1920 in Cernăuți, Romania (now Chernivtsi, Ukraine)	20 April 1970 in Paris, France	1968	The Sand from the Urns (1948); Poppy and Destiny (1952); From Threshold to Threshold (1955); The No-One's-Rose (1963); Breathturn (1967); Threadsuns (1968)	unnamed nominator
	Paul Celan	23 November 1920 in Cernăuți, Romania (now Chernivtsi, Ukraine)	20 April 1970 in Paris, France	1969	The Sand from the Urns (1948); Poppy and Destiny (1952); From Threshold to Threshold (1955); The No-One's-Rose (1963); Breathturn (1967); Threadsuns (1968)	Heinz Politzer et al. (Note: Other nominators of Celan in 1969 included Ernst Wilhelm Meyer (1892–1969), Dietrich Jöns (1924–2011) and Gerhart Baumann (1920–2006), all from Germany.) (1910–1978); Austria
	Eugène Ionesco	26 November 1909 in Slatina, Olt, Romania	28 March 1994 in Paris, France	1964	The Bald Soprano (1948); Jack, or The Submission (1950); The Lesson (1951); The Chairs (1951); Victims of Duty (1952); The New Tenant (1953); The Picture (1955); The Killer (1959); Rhinoceros (1959); Exit the King (1962); The Hermit (1973)	Erik Lindegren (1910–1968); Sweden
	Eugène Ionesco	26 November 1909 in Slatina, Olt, Romania	28 March 1994 in Paris, France	1967, 1971	The Bald Soprano (1948); Jack, or The Submission (1950); The Lesson (1951); The Chairs (1951); Victims of Duty (1952); The New Tenant (1953); The Picture (1955); The Killer (1959); Rhinoceros (1959); Exit the King (1962); The Hermit (1973)	Karl Ragnar Gierow (1904–1982); Sweden
	Eugène Ionesco	26 November 1909 in Slatina, Olt, Romania	28 March 1994 in Paris, France	1968	The Bald Soprano (1948); Jack, or The Submission (1950); The Lesson (1951); The Chairs (1951); Victims of Duty (1952); The New Tenant (1953); The Picture (1955); The Killer (1959); Rhinoceros (1959); Exit the King (1962); The Hermit (1973)	Walter Mönch et al. (Note: Other nominators of Ionesco in 1968 included Paul Vernois (1920–1997) of Belgium.) (1905–1994); Germany
	Eugène Ionesco	26 November 1909 in Slatina, Olt, Romania	28 March 1994 in Paris, France	1969	The Bald Soprano (1948); Jack, or The Submission (1950); The Lesson (1951); The Chairs (1951); Victims of Duty (1952); The New Tenant (1953); The Picture (1955); The Killer (1959); Rhinoceros (1959); Exit the King (1962); The Hermit (1973)	Eyvind Johnson (1900–1976); Sweden
	Eugène Ionesco	26 November 1909 in Slatina, Olt, Romania	28 March 1994 in Paris, France	1970	The Bald Soprano (1948); Jack, or The Submission (1950); The Lesson (1951); The Chairs (1951); Victims of Duty (1952); The New Tenant (1953); The Picture (1955); The Killer (1959); Rhinoceros (1959); Exit the King (1962); The Hermit (1973)	Louis Alexander MacKay (1901–1982); Canada; United States
	Eugène Ionesco	26 November 1909 in Slatina, Olt, Romania	28 March 1994 in Paris, France	1972	The Bald Soprano (1948); Jack, or The Submission (1950); The Lesson (1951); The Chairs (1951); Victims of Duty (1952); The New Tenant (1953); The Picture (1955); The Killer (1959); Rhinoceros (1959); Exit the King (1962); The Hermit (1973)	Johannes Söderlind (1918–2001); Sweden
	Tudor Arghezi	21 May 1880 in Bucharest, Romania	14 July 1967 in Bucharest, Romania	1965	Fitting Words (1927); Flowers of Mildew (1932); The Black Gate (1932); Tablets from the Land of Kuty (1934)	Angelo Monteverdi (1886–1967); Italy
	Zaharia Stancu	7 October 1902 in Salcia, Teleorman, Romania	5 December 1974 in Bucharest, Romania	1969	Simple Poems (1927); Camp Days (1945); Barefoot (1948); A Gamble with Death (1962); The Mad Forest (1963); The Gypsy Tribe (1968)	Șerban Cioculescu et al. (Note: Other nominators of Stancu in 1969 included Alexandru Philippide (1900–1979), Andrei Oțetea (1894–1977), George Ivașcu (1911–1988), Marin Preda (1922–1980), Virgil Teodorescu (1909–1987), Aurel Baranga (1913–1979), Ovid Crohmălniceanu (1921–2000), Dumitru Panaitescu-Perpessicius (1891–1971), Demostene Botez (1893–1973), and George Macovescu (1913–2002), all from Romania.) (1902–1988); Romania
	Zaharia Stancu	7 October 1902 in Salcia, Teleorman, Romania	5 December 1974 in Bucharest, Romania	1971	Simple Poems (1927); Camp Days (1945); Barefoot (1948); A Gamble with Death (1962); The Mad Forest (1963); The Gypsy Tribe (1968)	Karl Ragnar Gierow (1904–1982); Sweden
	Zaharia Stancu	7 October 1902 in Salcia, Teleorman, Romania	5 December 1974 in Bucharest, Romania	1972	Simple Poems (1927); Camp Days (1945); Barefoot (1948); A Gamble with Death (1962); The Mad Forest (1963); The Gypsy Tribe (1968)	Miguel Ángel Asturias et al. (Note: Other nominators of Stancu in 1972 included Victor Eftimiu (1889–1972) of Romania.) (1899–1974); Guatemala
	Zaharia Stancu	7 October 1902 in Salcia, Teleorman, Romania	5 December 1974 in Bucharest, Romania	1973	Simple Poems (1927); Camp Days (1945); Barefoot (1948); A Gamble with Death (1962); The Mad Forest (1963); The Gypsy Tribe (1968)	Alf Lombard et al. (Note: Other nominators included Miguel Ángel Asturias (1899–1974) of Guatemala, Andri Peer (1921–1985) of Switzerland, and Virgil Teodorescu (1909–1987) of Romania.) (1902–1996); Sweden
	Eugen Barbu	20 February 1924 in Bucharest, Romania	7 September 1993 in Bucharest, Romania	1970	Golden Triplet (1956); The Pit (1957); The Making of the World (1964); The Prince (1969)	Alexandru Rosetti (1895–1990); Romania
	Elie Wiesel	30 September 1928 in Sighetu Marmației, Maramureș, Romania	2 July 2016 in Manhattan, New York, United States	1971	Night (1960); Dawn (1961); Day (1962); The Gates of the Forest (1964); The Oath (1973)	Gerd Høst (1915–2007); Norway
	Elie Wiesel	30 September 1928 in Sighetu Marmației, Maramureș, Romania	2 July 2016 in Manhattan, New York, United States	1972	Night (1960); Dawn (1961); Day (1962); The Gates of the Forest (1964); The Oath (1973)	André Neher (1914–1988); France
	Elie Wiesel	30 September 1928 in Sighetu Marmației, Maramureș, Romania	2 July 2016 in Manhattan, New York, United States	1973	Night (1960); Dawn (1961); Day (1962); The Gates of the Forest (1964); The Oath (1973)	Robert Alter et al. (Note: Other nominators included Marver Bernstein (1919–1990), Albert H. Bowker (1919–2008), Jules Brody (1928–2021), Harry J. Cargas (1932–1998), Gerson D. Cohen (1924–1991), David Daiches (1912–2005), Louis Finkelstein (1895–1991), Maurice Stanley Friedman (1921–2012), Victor Gourevitch (1925–2020), Irving Greenberg (born 1933), Irving Halperin (1922–2000), Philip Handler (1917–1981), James McNaughton Hester (1924–2014), Gerd Høst-Heyerdahl (1915–2007), Lothar Kahn (1922–1990), Louis L. Kaplan (1902–2001), Jack Kolbert (born 1927), Joshua Lederberg (1925–2008), André Michel Lwoff (1902–1994), Gabriel Marcel (1889–1973), Robert Marshak (1916–1992)) (born 1935); United States
	Eugen Jebeleanu	24 April 1911 in Câmpina, Prahova, Romania	21 August 1991 in Bucharest, Romania	1973	The Smile of Hiroshima (1958); Lidice, Songs against Death (1963); Elegy for the Cut Flower (1966)	Miron Nicolescu et al. (Note: Other nominators included Grigore Moisil (1906–1973), Alexandru A. Philippide (1900–1979), and Corneliu Baba (1906–1997), all from Romania.) (1903–1975); Romania
Peace
	Vespasian Pella	17 January 1897 in Bucharest, Romania	24 August 1952 in New York City, New York, United States	1926	"for promoting the idea of international criminal proceedings against war crimes through a special international tribunal."	Constantin Dissescu (1854–1932); Romania
	Peter Tomaschek	11 July 1882 in Siret, Suceava, Romania	1 December 1940 in Siret, Suceava, Romania	1931	"for his visionary ideas on the issues of world peace." (Note: Tomaschek's important studies on world peace were Paneuropa sau Popoarele Unite ale Lumii? Propuneri privind realizarea păcii mondiale ("Paneuropa or the United Nations of the World? Proposals Regarding the Achievement of World Peace", 1931) and arşul milioanelor pentru cucerirea păcii ("Millions March for the Conquest of Peace", 1931).)	Pantelimon Chirilă (1899–1952); Romania
	Peter Tomaschek	11 July 1882 in Siret, Suceava, Romania	1 December 1940 in Siret, Suceava, Romania	1933	"for his visionary ideas on the issues of world peace."	Ștefan Percec (1873–1938); Romania
	Peter Tomaschek	11 July 1882 in Siret, Suceava, Romania	1 December 1940 in Siret, Suceava, Romania	1934, 1935, 1936, 1937	"for his visionary ideas on the issues of world peace."	Erast Nastasi (1898-1933); Romania
	Andreo Cseh	12 September 1895 in Luduș, Mureș County, Romania	9 March 1979 in The Hague Netherlands	1934 (Note: No Nobel Peace Prize has been awarded this year.)	"for his apostolic action for international understanding and peace, uniting people by means of a common language (Esperanto) and working on reconciliation of mankind."	Henri La Fontaine (1854–1943); France
	Eugen Relgis	22 March 1895 in Iași, Romania	24 May 1987 in Montevideo, Uruguay	1956	"for his steadfast dedication toward humanitarianism and pacifism.	members of Japanese Parliament
	Elie Wiesel	30 September 1928 in Sighetu Marmației, Maramureș, Romania	2 July 2016 in Manhattan, New York, United States	1970	"for being a messenger of peace and brotherhood, fighting in for the cause of human rights and building bridges between generations through his literary works."	Jean Halpérin et al. (Note: Other nominators of Wiesel in 1970 included Walter Kaufmann (1921–1980) of Germany–United States "for Wisel's literary works and their ability to communicate to a younger generation how to speak without hatred, even after witnessing man's inhumanity towards other men"; Maurice S. Friedman (1921–2012) of the United States "on the grounds of Wiesel's powerful and uniquely influential portrait in his literary work The Jews of Silence and his candor, fairness, and clear trust in mankind despite all that has happened in our time"; and Jean Ziegler (born 1934) of Switzerland "for Wiesel's courageous and profoundly intelligent efforts to hinder separation of peoples and promote true human connection.") (1921–2012); France
	Elie Wiesel	30 September 1928 in Sighetu Marmației, Maramureș, Romania	2 July 2016 in Manhattan, New York, United States	1971	"for, in terms of his own personal experience of horrors and his subsequent efforts for peace, having become a symbol of hope and an inspiration to peoples throughout the world."	Fred Roy Harris et al. (Note: Other nominators of Wisel in 1971 included Amiya Chakravarty (1901–1986) of India "for [Wiesel] being a prominent author, transcendent humanist, and intrepid peace-worker"; Alan Cranston (1914–2000) of the United States "for [Wiesel] having offered a moral perspective on the Holocaust which bears broad implications about human nature, civilization, and moral value, and throughout his novels and essays, his travels and lectures, he has been a ceaseless advocate of peace"; Hubert Humphrey (1911–1978) of the United States "for throughout Wiesel's novels and essays, his travels and lectures being a ceaseless advocate of peace and for his works of great importance, especially since a generation has passed since the end of the Second World War"; André Monteil (1915–1998) of France "for Wiesel's work against hate, and his faith in mankind and the final victory of the forces of progress and peace"; Jacob Javits (1904–1986) of United States "for showing a wisdom born of incredible suffering and a burning desire in his writing to bring the inexorable lessons of the Holocaust home to mankind"; and Emil Fackenheim (1916–2003) of Israel without motivations for the nomination.) (born 1930); United States
	Elie Wiesel	30 September 1928 in Sighetu Marmației, Maramureș, Romania	2 July 2016 in Manhattan, New York, United States	1972		George McGovern et al. (Note: Other nominators of Wiesel in 1973 included Olivier de Pierrebourg (1908–1973) of France, Walter Kaufmann (1921–1980) of Germany–United States, Henry M. Jackson (1912–1983) of the United States, Paul Stehlin (1907–1975) of France, Richard A. Falk (born 1930) of the United States, Georg Leber (1920–2012) of Germany, Haakon Olsen Wika (1899–1981) and Ingemund Gullvåg (1925–1998) of Norway.) (1922–2012); United States
	Elie Wiesel	30 September 1928 in Sighetu Marmației, Maramureș, Romania	2 July 2016 in Manhattan, New York, United States	1973		Hubert Humphrey et al. (Note: Other nominators of Wiesel in 1973 included Ingemund Gullvåg (1925–1998) of Norway and Henry M. Jackson (1912–1983) of the United States.) (1911–1978); United States
	4 Romanian (part of the 1000 PeaceWomen) (Note: The four Romanian women who formed part in the 1000 PeaceWomen were Cristina Guseth, Erzsebet Turos, Cornelia Negoiță, and Soknan Han Jung.)	began in 2003 in Bern, Switzerland		2005	"in recognition of women's efforts and visibility in promoting peace all over the world."	Ruth-Gaby Vermot-Mangold (born 1941) Switzerland
