= Salutation (disambiguation) =

A salutation is a word or phrase of greeting.

Salutation may also refer to:

- Angelic Salutation, or Hail Mary, a Catholic prayer

== Arts and entertainment ==
- Salutations (album), 2017, by Conor Oberst
- Salutation (ballet), 1936
- Salutations (play), a 1966 French sketch
- Vito & the Salutations, a 1960s New York doo-wop group
- Salutation, composed by Charles Edmund Rubbra

== Places ==
- Salutation (estate), a New York mansion
- The Salutation, Sandwich, a house in Kent, England
- Salutation, Hammersmith, a London pub
- Salutation Island, Shark Bay, Australia
