= Matei Basarab National College =

High school in Bucharest, Romania

Coordinates: 44.4303°N 26.1135°E

- Colegiul Național "Matei Basarab"
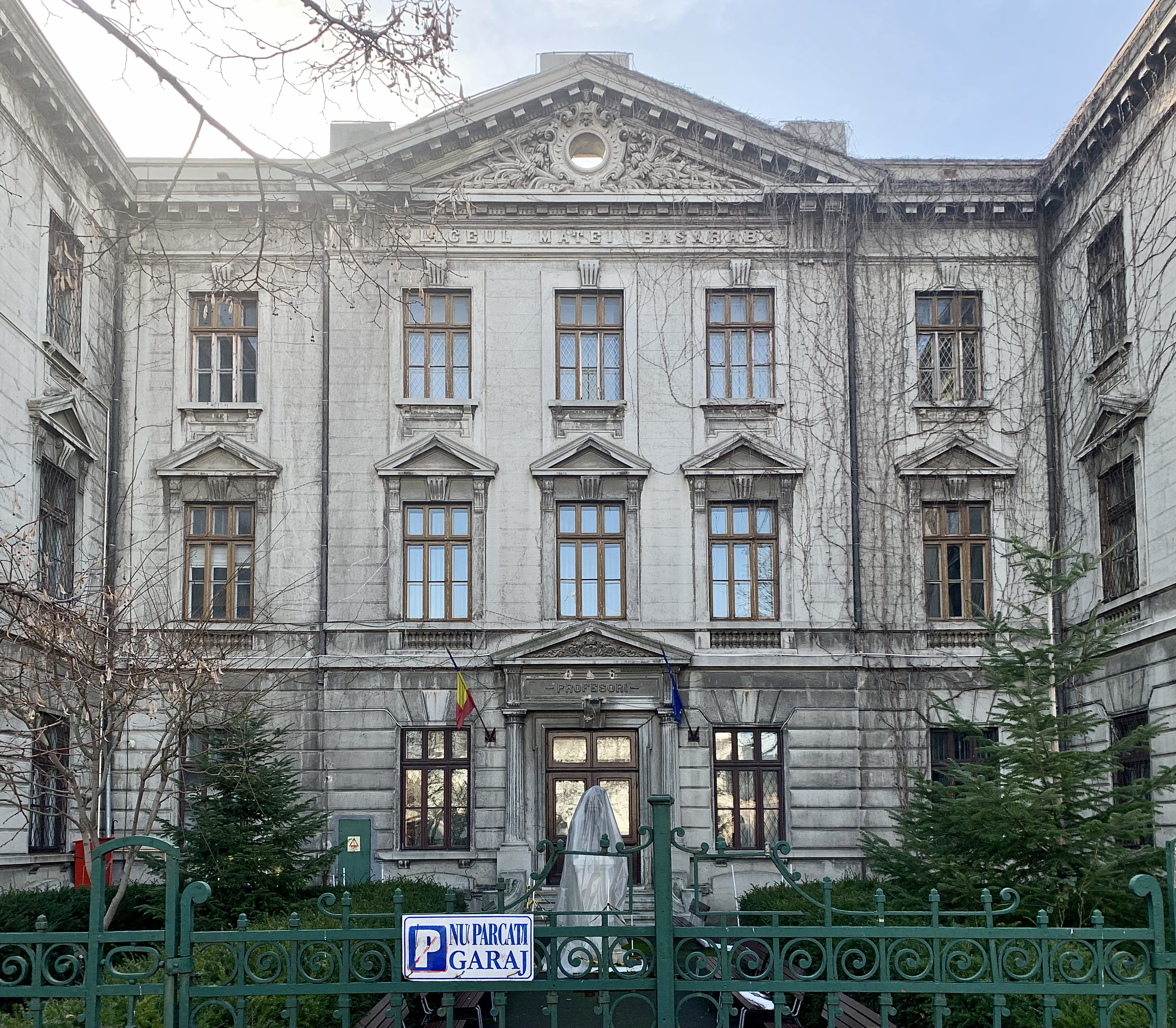

Location
- Matei Basarab 32; Bucharest, Romania

Information
- School type: Secondary
- Established: 25 November 1859
- Founder: Alexandru Ioan Cuza
- Status: Active
- Nickname: CNMB
- Newspaper: Basarab Highschool Magazine
- Alumni: Lucrețiu Pătrășcanu, George Topîrceanu, Radu D. Rosetti, Ion Mincu and more
- Website: https://basarab.ro/

Matei Basarab National College (Romanian: Colegiul Național "Matei Basarab") is a high school in central Bucharest, Romania, located at 32 Matei Basarab Street, Sector 3. It is one of the oldest secondary education institutions in Bucharest, second only to Saint Sava National College. It opened in November 1859, one of two secondary schools to open that year in the Romanian capital, the other being Gheorghe Lazăr Gymnasium, in order to supplement the older Saint Sava.

It is named after Matei Basarab, a 17th century Wallachian prince responsible for a cultural, artistic and societal renaissance and known as the greatest builder of churches in Romanian history along with Stephen the Great. Responsible for replacing Old Church Slavonic with Romanian during religious processions, he also initiated a failed anti-Ottoman alliance with Poland and Russia.

It became a National College in 1998, marking the historical and educational prestige associated with the institution.

== History ==
=== Establishment of the gymnasium (1859 - 1860) ===
Following the unification of the Romanian Principalities Wallachia and Moldavia of 1859, the newly elected prince Alexandru Ioan Cuza enacted an educational reform aimed at the restructuring of the institutional framework of the education system of the new country. As such, on 25 November 1859, decretul domnesc numărul 158 (the 158th princely decree) established a new gymnasium that had its original location on Calea Craiovei (currently Calea Rahovei), an important avenue in present-day Bucharest.

The first lectures officially took place nearly a year later, on 3 November 1860. The original location of the school was varied, lessons and courses taking place on the premises of the various properties of Ioan Urlăţeanu and Tomiţă Atanasovici, rich landowners of the era. Students of the school would also participate at lessons held inside the chambers of the church Sf. Apostoli.

==== First split ====
In 1878, due to overcrowding and an expanding demand for secondary education, a new school split from Matei Basarab and took on the name of Cantemir-Vodă, which will go on to become the Cantemir-Vodă National College.

=== Move to the current building ===
In 1885, at the incentive of the education minister of the time, Spiru Haret, the school is moved to the actual building it still resides in to this day, on Matei Basarab Street in the Jewish Quarter of Bucharest. The original proprietors of the land to which it was moved were the descendants of August Treboniu Laurian, a founding member of the Romanian Academy and participant in the Romanian revolution of 1848. The initial building featured the current central structure and its two floors with 4 rooms each, with the two current wings and an additional floor added later to also host additional classrooms, secretary and principal offices.

Three years later, the bust of prince Matei Basarab was unveiled, which still sits in the central courtyard of the high school to this day.

==== Second and third split ====
In 1892, another split took place - a new secondary education institution was founded, which went on to become the Gheorghe Șincai National College. A third and final split happened in 1913, the resulting institution eventually becoming the Spiru Haret National College.

=== Interwar period and Second World War (1918 - 1945) ===
In the interwar period, a gym meant for sports classes and a festivities hall were also built. The festivities hall, built between 1923 and 1928, would become a major addition to the school due to both its architectural design and its importance of the subsequent years.

During the early 1940s, as Romania fell increasingly under the influence of Ion Antonescu’s fascist and antisemitic regime, the high school - like many educational institutions in Bucharest - was compelled to align itself with the new ideological and political directives of the state. In doing so, the school implemented exclusionary policies that resulted in the expulsion of a substantial number of Jewish students. This action not only mirrored the broader pattern of systemic discrimination imposed across the country’s educational system but also carried particular weight given the school’s location within a district historically known for its vibrant Jewish community.

A notable student of the school, Justin Georgescu, became a top alumni, eventually becoming a communist and anti-fascist activist until he was assassinated by authorities of the Antonescu regime while going to a clandestine UTC cell meeting, in 1942.

=== Post-war and during the communist regime (1945 - 1989) ===
During the first post-war years, it hosted plays of the National Theatre of Bucharest, between 1945 and 1947, after the actual building of the theatre was damaged during Allied bombings of Bucharest in 1944.

After the war, the college resumed normal lectures, largely unaffected by it. Until the abdication of King Michael on 30 December 1947, the institution continued to be referred to as a college and acted as a largely humanities-focused lyceum. Beginning with the communist take-over of the government and the proclamation of the People's Republic of Romania in 1948, the high school was named simply Liceul "Matei Basarab" and was subject to the laws of the new authorities applied generally to every secondary education institution: a shift towards sciences took place, supplemented to the previous curricula being a new mathematics-physics department, together with obligatory Russian language lessons. During those years, the institution went through numerous incarnations, either becoming an industrial (lower tier) or theoretical (higher tier) high school.

=== Post communism ===
After the fall of the Ceașusescu regime in 1989, the high school was once again subject to post-communist education reform, having its curricula structured along two main branches: humanities and exact sciences, with two sub-branches: social sciences and philology, and mathematics-informatics and natural sciences respectively.

In 1998 it attained the highest tier in the Romanian education system, earning the designation of a National College, owing to its age and educational prestige in both local and national education. In 1999 it earned the title of "pilot school" for the Municipality of Bucharest for the respective year.

== Present day ==
During the 21st century, the school has had various reputations in the community of Bucharest, being judged as an average-to-high level school due to its results at both the Baccalaureate and its admission exams.

Towards the middle of the 2010s and into the 2020s, the National College began ranking among the top 10 high schools in Bucharest and among the highest and prestigious ones at the national level, along with Gheorghe Lazăr National College and its children institutions, Gheorghe Șincai, Cantemir-Vodă and Spiru Haret, but still trailed the more elite Mihai Viteazul and Saint Sava National Colleges.

According to data from October 2025, the institution is ranked 12th among 120 high schools in Bucharest and 39th among 1,398 nationwide based on the average grade obtained in the national graduation exam. When evaluated by admission grades, it ranks 5th in Bucharest and 6th in Romania.

Besides the standard curricula for a theoretical high school in Romania, extracurricular activities for the students include a theatre and musical band, a choir and a debate club active in inter-school competitions at both local and national level. The students' council also administers a student magazine, Basarab High School Magazine, and represents the pupils' interests in the National Students' Council of Romania.

== Notable teachers and alumni ==
=== Teachers ===
- Emanoil Bacaloglu
- George Călinescu
- Mitiță Constantinescu
- Eugen Lovinescu
- Constantin Moisil
- Gheorghe Munteanu-Murgoci
- Dumitru Panaitescu-Perspessicius
- Dimitrie D. Pătrășcanu
- Ion Popescu-Voitești
- Constantin F. Robescu
- Ioan Slavici
- Theodor Speranția
- G. Dem. Teodorescu
- Claudiu Isopescu,
- George Potra.

=== Alumni ===
- Constantin Antoniade
- Aurel Baranga
- Nicolae Cajal
- Paul Georgescu
- Alexandru Graur
- Petre V. Haneș
- Petre Iorgulescu-Yor
- Ștefan Octavian Iosif
- Constantin Levaditi
- Adrian Maniu
- Gheorghe Marinescu
- Constantin Miculescu
- Vintilă M. Mihăilescu
- Ion Mincu
- Costin Murgescu
- Ștefan S. Nicolau
- Miron Nicolescu
- Dimitrie Paciurea
- Lucrețiu Pătrășcanu
- Radu D. Rosetti
- George Topîrceanu
- Ilarie Voronca
- George Vraca
- Duiliu Zamfirescu
- George Oprescu
- Nicolae Secăreanu
