= Armenteros (surname) =

Armenteros is a Spanish surname. Notable people with the surname include:

- Alfredo "Chocolate" Armenteros (1928–2016), Cuban trumpeter
- Emiliano Armenteros (born 1986), Argentine footballer
- José Armenteros (born 1992), Cuban judoka
- Juan Armenteros (1928–2003), Cuban baseball player
- Lázaro Armenteros (born 1999), Cuban baseball player
- Rafael Armenteros (1922–2004), Spanish particle physicist
- Samuel Armenteros (born 1990), Swedish footballer
