= Mircea Eliade bibliography =

This is a bibliography of works by Mircea Eliade.

== Scholarly works ==
- The Comparative History of Yoga Techniques, 1933
- Oceanografie, 1934
- Alchimia Asiatică, 1934
- Yoga: Essai sur les origines de la mystique indienne, 1936
- Cosmologie și alchimie babiloniană, 1937
- Fragmentarium, 1939
- Comentarii la legenda Meșterului Manole, 1943
- Techniques du Yoga, 1948
- Traité d'histoire des religions, 1949 - Patterns in Comparative Religion
- Le Chamanisme et les techniques archaïques de l'extase, 1951
  - Shamanism: Archaic Techniques of Ecstasy, rev'd & enlarg'd edn. Trans. by Willard R. Trask. NY: Pantheon Books; London: Routledge & K. Paul, 1964 (reprint 1974, 1989, 2004).
- Images et Symboles, 1952 - Images and Symbols
- Forgerons et alchimistes, 1956 - The Forge and the Crucible.
- Cosmos and History: The Myth of the Eternal Return, translated: W.R. Trask. Princeton, NJ: Princeton University Press, 1954. Originally published as Le Mythe de l'eternel retour: archétypes et répetition, 1949.
- Yoga, Immortality and Freedom, translated: W.R. Trask. London: Routledge & Kegan Paul, 1958. First published in French as Yoga: Essai sur l'origine de la mystique Indienne in 1933.
- Rites and Symbols of Initiation (Birth and Rebirth), translated: W. Trask, London: Harvill Press, 1958. The publication of Eliade's 1956 Haskell Lectures at the University of Chicago, Patterns of Initiation.
- Patterns in Comparative Religion, translated: R. Sheed, London: Sheed and Ward, 1958.
- The Sacred and the Profane: The Nature of Religion, translated from French: W.R. Trask, Harvest/HBJ Publishers, 1957 ISBN 0-15-679201-X.
- Myths, Dreams and Mysteries: the Encounter between Contemporary Faiths and Archaic Realities, translated: P. Mairet, London: Harvill Press, 1959.
- Images and Symbols: Studies in Religious Symbolism, translated: P. Mairet, London: Harvill Press, 1961.
- Patanjali et Yoga, 1962 - Patanjali and Yoga
- Myth and Reality, translated: W. Trask, New York: Harper and Row, 1963.
- Shamanism: Archaic Techniques of Ecstasy, translated: W.R. Trask. London: Routledge and Kegan Paul, 1964. Originally published Le Chamanisme, 1951.
- The Two and the One, translated: J.M. Cohen, Chicago, IL: University of Chicago Press, 1965.
- The Quest: History and Meaning in Religion, London: University of Chicago Press, 1969.
- De Zalmoxis à Gengis-Khan. Études comparatives sur les religions et le folklore de la Dacie et de l'Europe orientale, Payot, 1970
- Zalmoxis, The Vanishing God, The University of Chicago Press, 1972.
- Australian Religions, Cornell University Press, 1973
- Occultism, Witchcraft and Cultural Fashions, The University of Chicago Press, 1976
- A History of Religious Ideas, vol. I, From the Stone Age to the Eleusinian Mysteries, translated: W. Trask, Chicago, IL: University of Chicago Press, 1978.
- A History of Religious Ideas, vol. II, From Gautama Buddha to the Triumph of Christianity, translated: W. Trask, Chicago, IL: University of Chicago Press, 1982.
- The History of Religious Ideas, vol. III, From Muhammad to the Age of the Reforms, translated: A. Hiltebeitel and D. Apostolos-Cappadona, Chicago, IL: University of Chicago Press, 1985.
- Symbolism, the Sacred, and the Arts, edited by Diane Apostolos-Cappadona, The Crossroad Publishing Company, N.Y., 1986. ISBN 0-8245-0723-1
- Encyclopedia of Religion (editor-in-chief), New York: Macmillan, 1987.
- From Primitives to Zen (full text).
- The Harpercollins Concise Guide to World Religions, 2000 (with Ioan P. Culianu, Hillary S. Wiesner)

== Fiction ==
- 1921, Cum am găsit piatra filosofală. (How I Found the Philosophers’ Stone). Eliade's first story to be published when he was fourteen years old. RR p. 40.
- 1924, Romanul adolescentului miop. (Novel of the Nearsighted Adolescent). Published in serial form in the periodicals Cuvântul, Viața Literară, and Universul Literar. Published in French: Le roman de l'adolescent myope. Paris: Acte Sud, 1992. RR pp. 48–73.
- 1927, Itinerar spiritual. (Spiritual Itinerary) Cuvântul (Sept.- Nov. 1927). RR pp. 245–270.
- 1928, Gaudeamus. A sequel to Romanul adolescentului miop, first published in 1986 in Revista de istorie și teorie literară. RR pp. 56, 198–201.
- 1928, Apologia virilității (Apology for Virility) In Gândirea, 8 (1928):8-9. RR pp. 216–223.
- 1930, Isabel și apele diavolului (Isabel and the Devil's Waters). Editura Națională Ciornei, Bucharest. RR pp.414–436.
- 1932, Într-o Mănăstire din Himalaya, (In a Himalayan Monastery) Editura Cartea Românească, Bucharest.
- 1932, Întoarcerea din rai (Return from Paradise). Written in late 1932 and published in 1934, Editura Națională Ciornei, Bucharest. The first part of a projected trilogy with Huliganii (The Hooligans) and Viața Nouă (New Life). RR pp.677–707, 1035-1040.
- 1933, Maitreyi. Editura Cultura Națională, Bucharest. Translated from the Romanian by Alain Guillermou — La Nuit Bengali, Lausanne: Gallimard, 1950. Translated from the French by Catherine Spencer — Bengal Nights, Chicago: University of Chicago Press, 1994. RR pp.464–486, pp.535–541.
- 1934, Lumina ce se stinge (The Failing Light), Editura Cartea Românească, Bucharest. RR pp.436–460.
- 1934, Șantier (Work in Progress, an "indirect novel"), Editura Cugetarea, Bucharest, 1935. RR pp.752–755.
- 1935, Huliganii (The Hooligans), Editura Națională Ciornei, Bucharest. RR pp.1007–1035.
- 1935, Domnișoara Christina (Miss Christina). Mademoiselle Christina. Paris: L’Herne 1978. (French introduction by Eliade, 1978.). RR pp.1045–1052. In Mystic Stories: The Sacred and Profane. Tr. Ana Cartianu, edited by Kurt Treptow. Classics of Romanian Literature Series, Vol. II. Boulder: East European Monographs, 1992.
- 1936, Șarpele (The Serpent). Editura Națională Ciornei, Bucharest, 1937. Andronic et le Serpent. Paris: L’Herne 1979. (Introduction by Sorin Alexandrescu). RR pp.1057–1073.
- 1937, Aventura (An Adventure) and Întâlnire (An Encounter). Both published in the back of the original edition of Șarpele. RR pp. 1041–1042.
- 1938, Nuntă în cer (Marriage in Heaven). RR pp. 1160–1178. Won the Elba-Brignetti prize for the best novel in Italian 1983, Nozze in Ciello. Also published in German: Hochzeit im Himmel.
- 1939, Iphigenia. Play, first published as Iphigenia: piesă în trei acte. Valle Hermosa, Argentina: Editura Cartea Pribegiei, 1951. Also published as Ifigenia: piesă în trei acte: cinci tablouri. Bucharest: 1974. RR pp.1178–1185.
- 1940, Nopți la Serampore (Nights at Serampore). Translated by William Ames Coates, in Two Strange Tales. Boston and London: Shambhala, 1986.ISBN 0877733864 RR pp.1185–1193.
- 1940, Secretul doctorului Honigberger (The Secret of Dr. Honigberger). Translated by William Ames Coates, in Two Strange Tales. Boston and London: Shambhala, 1986.
- 1943, Oameni și pietre (Men and Stones) Play. RR pp.1193–1199.
- 1945, Un om mare (A Great Man). Translated by Eric Tappe. In Fantastic Tales. London: Dillon’s, 1969. RR pp.1199–1203.
- 1946, Fratele risipitor (The Prodigal Brother). Luceafărul, 2, 1949, pp. 162–70.)
- 1951, 1241 (A Play in One Act) in Caiete de dor, 4 (1951): 10-14. Republished in Revista de istorie si teorie literară XXXIV (April–September, 1986): 2-3.
- 1952, Douăsprezece mii de capete de vite (Twelve Thousand Heads of Cattle). Translated by Eric Tappe. In Fantastic Tales. London: Dillon’s, 1969.
- 1954, Noaptea de Sânziene (The Forbidden Forest), Ioan Cusa, Paris, 1971. Translated by M. L. Ricketts and Mary Park Stevenson. Notre Dame: University of Notre Dame Press, 1978.
- 1955, Fata căpitanului (The Captain's Daughter). Published in La Țigănci și alte povestiri, Bucharest: Editura pentru Literatură, 1969.
- 1955, Adio (Goodbye) in La Țigănci și alte povestiri, translated by M. L. Ricketts in Imagination and Meaning. The Scholarly and Literary Works of Mircea Eliade, edited by Norman Girardot and M. L. Ricketts. New York: The Seabury Press, 1982.
- 1960, La Țigănci (With the Gypsy Girls). Translated by William Ames Coates. In Tales of the Sacred and Supernatural. Philadelphia: Westminster Press, 1981.
- 1963, O fotografie veche de 14 ani (A Fourteen Year Old Photograph). First published in Nuvele, Madrid; Colecția Destin, 1963. Translated by M. Ricketts. The Louisberg College Journal, vol. VIII (1974): 3-15.
- 1963, Ivan in Nuvele, Madrid, Colecția Destin: 1963.
- 1963, Podul (The Bridge), in La Țigănci și alte povestiri, Bucharest.
- 1963, Ghicitor în pietre (The Man Who Could Read Stone) in Nuvele, Madrid, Colectia Destin: 1963. Translated by Mac Linscott Ricketts in Changing Religious Worlds: The Meaning and End of Mircea Eliade, ed. Bryan Rennie. Albany, NY: 2000.
- 1964, Într-o cazarmă (In a Barracks) in Destin (Madrid), 13-14 (1964): 84-92.
- 1967, Pe Strada Mântuleasa (The Old Man and the Bureaucrats). Translated by Mary Park Stevenson. Notre Dame and London: University of Notre Dame Press, 1979.
- 1968, În curte la Dionis (In Dionysus’ Court — a collection of short stories), Editura Cartea Românească, Bucharest.
- 1970, Coloana nesfârșită (The Endless Column), in Coloana nesfârșită, Editura Minerva, 1996. Play. Translated by Mary Park Stevenson in Dialectics and Humanism 10, 1 (1983): 44-88.
- 1971, Uniforme de general (Two Generals’ Uniforms), in În curte la Dionis (In Dionysus’ Court — a collection of short stories), Caietele inorogului IV, Paris, 1977.
- 1974, Incognito la Buchenwald (Incognito at Buchenwalt), in În curte la Dionis, Caietele inorogului IV, Paris, 1977.
- 1975, Pelerina (The Cape), in Nuvele inedite, Editura Rum-Irina, Bucharest, 1991. Translated from the Romanian by Mac Linscott Ricketts in Youth Without Youth. Columbus: Ohio State University Press, 1988.
- 1976, Les Trois Grâces in În curte la Dionis, Caietele inorogului IV, Paris, 1977. Translated by Mac Linscott Ricketts. In Tales of the Sacred and Supernatural. Philadelphia: Westminster Press, 1981.
- 1976, Tinerețe fără de tinerețe (Youth Without Youth) Translated by Mac Linscott Ricketts in Youth Without Youth. Columbus: Ohio State University Press, 1988.
- 1979, Nouăsprezece Trandafiri (Nineteen Roses) Translated by Mac Linscott Ricketts in Youth Without Youth. Columbus: Ohio State University Press, 1988.
- 1979, Dayan in Nuvele inedite, Editura Rum-Irina, Bucharest, 1991.
- 1982, La umbra unui crin (In the Shadow of a Lily) in Nuvele inedite, Editura Rum-Irina, Bucharest, 1991.
- 2012[1946], Aventura Spirituală (A Spiritual Adventure). Unpublished newly discovered and translated into English play by M. L. Ricketts. Theory in Action -the journal of the Transformative Studies Institute., vol. 5 (2012): 2-58.

== Other ==
- 1942, Salazar, Editura Gorjan
- 1943, Os romenos, Latinos do oriente
- 1988, Autobiography, Volume 2, 1937-1960: Exile's Odyssey, The University of Chicago Press, Chicago, ISBN 978-0226204116
- 1990, Autobiography. Volume I, 1907-1937: Journey East, Journey West, The University of Chicago Press, Chicago, [1981, Harper & Row, San Francisco] ISBN 978-0226204079
