= Petre Iorgulescu-Yor =

Romanian painter (1890–1939)

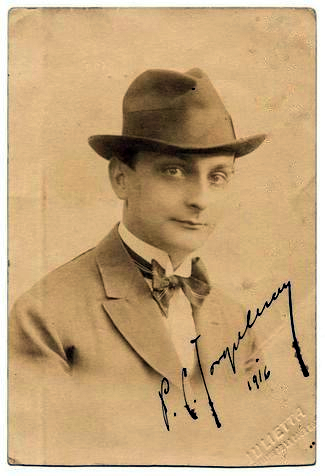
Petre Iorgulescu-Yor in 1916

Petre Iorgulescu-Yor (24 December 1890, Râmnicu Sărat – 29 April 1939, Bucharest) was a Romanian Expressionist painter of Jewish and Greek ancestry.

== Biography ==
His father was a landowner who held several local political offices. After attending the Matei Basarab High School in Bucharest, he graduated from the Law Faculty in Iași in 1914. During World War I, he went against his family's wishes and gave up a promising legal career to become an artist. He and his father were never reconciled. After the war, in 1919, he sold most of his belongings and went to Paris, where he enrolled at the Académie Julian; studying with Othon Friesz and Maurice Denis. He also came under the influence of Les Nabis. His début was at the Salon in 1920 and it received good reviews from the press.

In 1927, he and his friend, Vasile Popescu, spent their time painting in villages on the banks of the Siret. From 1928 to 1939, he was a regular exhibitor at the Official Bucharest Salon. Although he painted numerous still-lifes, landscapes with villages remained his speciality. He was particularly fond of Sighișoara and other small towns in Transylvania.

He also spent time in the Bulgarian seaside resort of Balchik and occasionally went to Brittany. In 1929, he won a gold medal at the Barcelona International Exposition. From 1933 to 1934, he was custodian at the new Municipal Art Gallery in Bucharest. For several years, he taught at a private art school.

He always led a disorganized, Bohemian lifestyle. His last years were marked by intense physical and mental suffering from unspecified conditions. In 1939, he stayed briefly at a sanatorium in Cluj and committed suicide by shooting himself later that year at his family's residence in Bucharest.

== Selected paintings ==
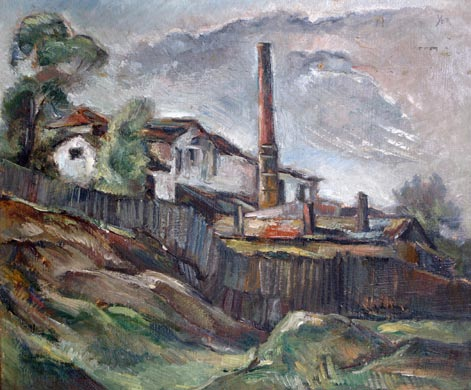
Industrial Landscape

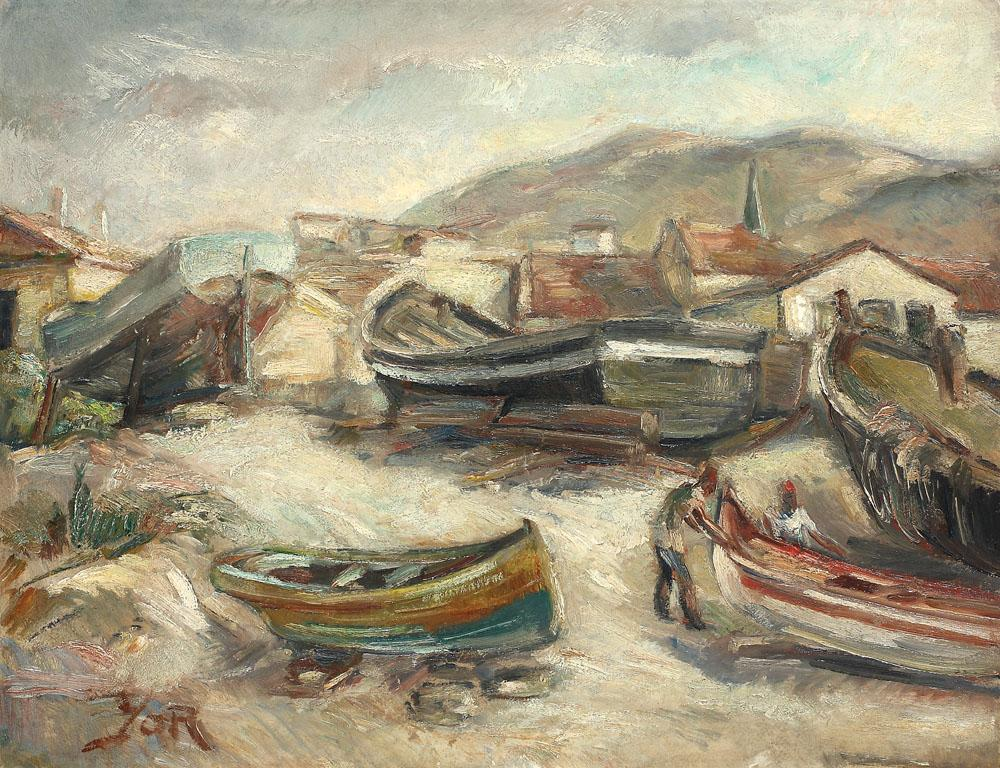
Fishermen with Dinghies

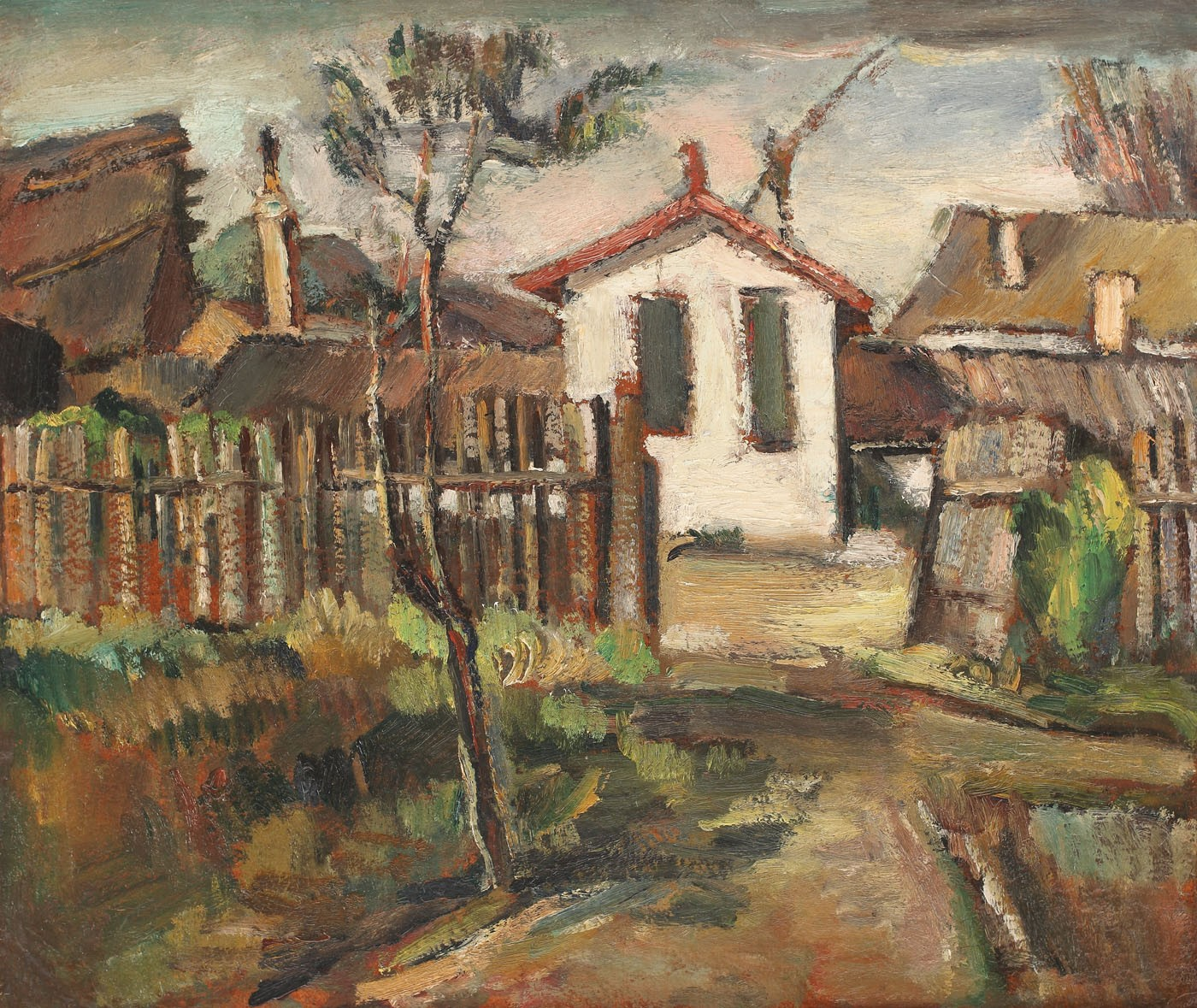
On the Edge of a Slum

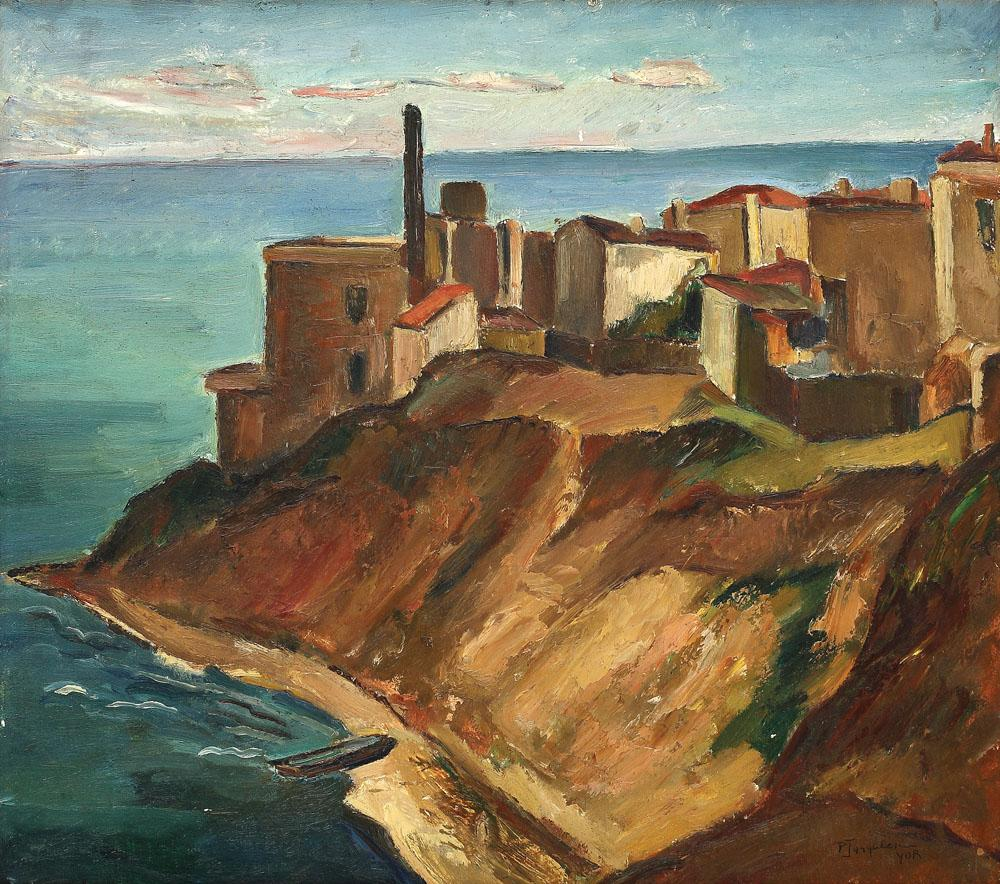
Cliff at Constanța
