= Improvisation or the Shepherd's Chameleon =

Theatre

Improvisation or The Shepherd’s Chameleon is a play by Eugene Ionesco, L'Impromptu de l'Alma published in French in 1956, in English in 1960 (translated by Donald Watson).

== Productions ==
The play premiered on February 20, 1956. Produced by The Mercury Theatre, Paris, at the Studio des Champs-Élysées, in a production by Maurice Jacquemont.

The play was first produced in New York as The Shepherd’s Chameleon by the American National Theatre and Academy (ANTA) at Theatre de Lys (NYC - 1960) starring Sudie Bond, Philip Bruns, Frank Groseclose, Gene Gross; directed by David Brooks (actor). (Theatre de Lys is now the Lucille Lortel Theatre).

Cesear’s Forum, a minimalist theatre company, presented the play, now entitled Improvisation or The Shepherd’s Chameleon at Chicago’s Playwright’s Center in a 1989 production.

== Synopsis ==
This Theatre of the Absurd one-act lampoons theatre criticism and theatrical conventions. Only about an hour in length and little known, it has seldom been seen since its inception. Ionesco, criticized for his early brand of avant-garde work, wrote the play as a responsive satire. Portraying himself as a beleaguered playwright, Ionesco is besieged by three scholarly critics; “Bartholoméus I, II, III and their attempt to replace truth with dogma. The character-author reveals the importance of theatre, and implicitly art, as an outlet for his inner obsessions.” He is saved from himself and The Dunciad by his cleaning lady.

== Themes ==
Theatrical debates of the 1950’s and 60’s began with the avant-garde theatre of Samuel Becket, Eugene Ionesco, Arthur Adamov, Jean Genet and Bertolt Brecht. Performance techniques and theories of alienation or the distancing effect that began with Erwin Piscator and epic theatre became part of this debate. This movement of aesthetics and art criticism, particularly in France, came to be known as Nouvelle Critique. Roland Barthes, Bernard Dort and Jean-Jacques Gautier are the three Academic Critics (Bartholoméus I, II, III, in that order) represented in the play. Ionesco’s French title of the play also references earlier satires; Molière’s L’Impromptu de Versailles and Jean Giraudoux’s L’Impromptu de Paris.

== Critical reception ==
Of the avante-garde movement, Robert W. Corrigan wrote, “these plays keep reasserting themselves; they have a mysterious hold on our sensibilities." Arthur Gelb in his New York Times 1960 review of the ANTA production writes, “The play, a long one-acter, is not only totally comprehensible but is also extremely funny... It is a wild, mocking, clear-eyed appraisal of theatre critics and scholars, avant-garde philosophers and obscurant playwrights –including one named Ionesco.” A Time Magazine article stated, “All this was no surprise to those who came expecting to be surprised, as any Ionesco audience must. It was a kind of Left Bank version of Author Meets the Critics, a personal attack on critics in dramatic form.” Both articles mention Eugene Ionesco, in person, at the close of the play; to discuss the influences on his work and provide an epilogue.

Of the Cesear’s Forum revival, Anthony Adler, in his Chicago Reader review, found the play dated, writing “it means almost nothing in 1989 Chicago, where the most influential critics aren't Derrida or Foucault but Siskel and Ebert.” Richard Christiansen, however, in the Chicago Tribune, noted that the play “looks back to earlier French satires by Molière and Jean Giradoux in the same vein, while keeping up the stream of verbal nonsense that Ionesco stampedas his own... The five actors, headed by director Greg Cesear as the embattled Ionesco, are distinctly un-French, but they understand the jokes and the conceits, and they play them zestfully, without a trip of the tongue.”
