= Twelve Thousand Head of Cattle =

- Short story by Mircea Eliade
- Original title: Douăsprezece mii de capete de vite
- Translator: Eric Tappe
- Country: Spain
- Language: Romanian
- Genre: fantasy

Publication
- Published in: Nuvele, Madrid
- Publication type: Short story collection
- Media type: print
- Publication date: 1963
- Published in English: 1969

Twelve Thousand Head of Cattle (Romanian: Douăsprezece mii de capete de vite) is a 1952 novella by the Romanian writer Mircea Eliade. It was written in Paris in December 1952 and published in 1963 in Nuvele, printed by Cercul de Studii "Destin" of Madrid. It was translated by Eric Tappe in Fantastic Tales, London, Dillon’s, 1969.

The subject of this novella is a strange time travel of a cattle dealer on a street in Bucharest during the Second World War. After a civil defense siren announces the imminence of an air raid, Iancu Gore is hiding in an anti-aircraft shelter. Also in the shelter are three other people. Later Iancu Gore learns that they died more than a month ago. His disturbing experience is not believed by anyone.

== See also ==
- Mircea Eliade bibliography
