= Hunger and Thirst =

- Written by: Eugène Ionesco
- Original language: French

Premiere
- Date premiered: February 28, 1966
- Place premiered: Comédie-Française

Hunger and Thirst (French original title La Soif et la faim) is one of Eugène Ionesco's late plays, premiering in Paris at Comédie-Française on February 28, 1966.

The play has one act divided into four periods. In the play, Ionesco depicts religion as an expression of conformism and of the alienation of idealism to the establishment. It was first produced in an English translation in the United States in April, 1967, by the Yale Dramatic Association.
