= The New Tenant =

Play by Eugène Ionesco

- Original language: French
- Written by: Eugène Ionesco
- Genre: Theatre of the Absurd

Premiere
- Date: 1955
- Place: Lilla Teatern

The New Tenant (French: Le Nouveau Locataire) is a play written by Eugène Ionesco in 1953, translated by Donald Watson in 1956, It premiered in 1955 in Lilla Teatern in Helsinki, Finland, directed by Vivica Bandler.

The central image is common to many Ionesco plays: something accumulates on stage and overwhelms the characters. In this case its furniture. The main characters are a gentleman, a caretaker, and two movers. The caretaker talks as the gentleman, the "new tenant" of the title, directs the two movers who continuously bring in furniture.
