= Israel Holmgren =

Israel Frithiofsson Holmgren (1871–1961) was a Swedish scientist, physician and professor at the Karolinska University Hospital in Stockholm. Politically he was a liberal and a teetotaler.

He was the son of professor Frithiof Holmgren and writer and feminist Ann-Margret Holmgren. Holmgren is mostly known for having been a prominent anti-fascist during the Second World War, when he collaborated closely with the Swedish socialist Ture Nerman in the propaganda struggle against nazism. In 1942 Holmgren wrote the book Nazisthelvetet (The Nazi Hell) for which he was sentenced to jail by a Swedish court for defying Sweden's neutrality in the war. Eventually he was pardoned. Holmgren decided to publish exactly the same book again, but with a new ironic title, this time called Nazistparadiset (The Nazi Paradise).

In 1959, shortly before he died, Israel Holmgren published his autobiography, Mitt liv, (My Life), in two parts.

Despite what his name might suggest, Israel Holmgren was not Jewish himself.
