= Rowland Pettit =

- Born: February 6, 1927 (age 99); Port Lincoln, South Australia, Australia
- Died: December 10, 1981 (aged 54)
- Occupation: Chemist

Rowland Pettit (February 6, 1927 – December 10, 1981) was an Australian-born American chemist. He was awarded an overseas scholarship from the Royal Commission 1851 from 1952 - 1954. He came to London to Queen Mary College to conduct research into "the molecular orbital theory of organic chemistry and its application". Pettit was noted for preparation of Cyclobutadieneiron tricarbonyl and the related trimethylenemethane complex. Pettit was head of the Department of Chemistry and W. T. Doherty Professor in Chemistry at the University of Texas, Austin, a member of the National Academy of Sciences, a member of the American Chemical Society, a member of the Chemical Society of London, a recipient of the American Chemical Society's the Southwest Regional Award, a member of the American Academy of Arts and Sciences.

The University of Texas said that Pettit was an "internationally recognized organic chemist".

Early Career

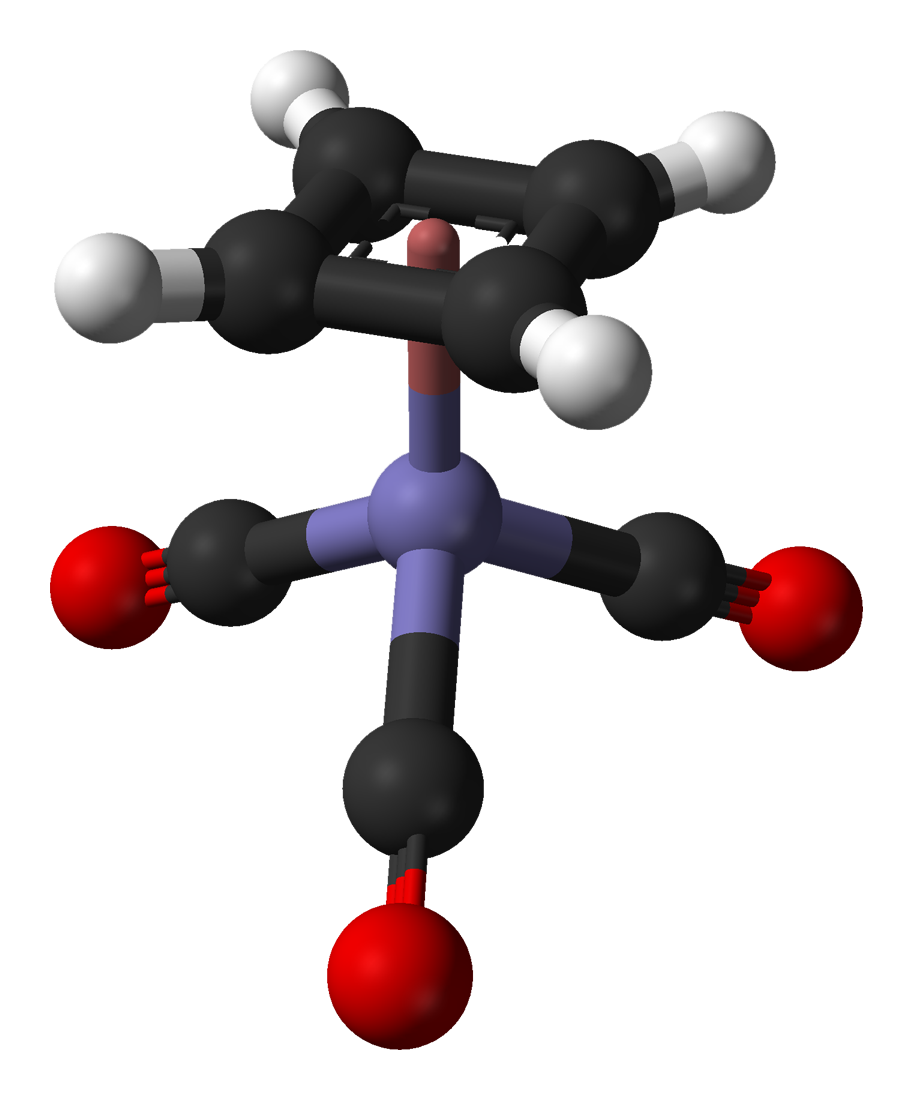
Cyclobutadieneiron tricarbonyl.

== Chronology ==
- 1927 born in Port Lincoln, Australia
- 1949 B.Sc, University of Adelaide
- 1950 M.Sc, University of Adelaide
- 1953 PhD in chemistry, University of Adelaide
- 1954 2nd PhD, Queen Mary College in London
- 1957 assistant professor, the University of Texas, Austin
- 1960 associate professor, the University of Texas, Austin
- 1963 professor of chemistry, the University of Texas, Austin
- 1968 Southwest Regional Award, the American Chemical Society
- 1970-1974 Chairman of Department of Chemistry, the University of Texas, Austin
- 1973 elected to the National Academy of Sciences
- 1980 advanced to W. T. Doherty Professor in Chemistry, the University of Texas, Austin
- 1981 dies in Austin, Texas

== Scholarship ==
Some of his work has been summarized with a focus on his synthesis of Cyclobutadieneiron tricarbonyl.
