= Nicolae Cajal =

Romanian Jewish physician, academic, politician and philanthropist

- Born: October 1, 1919; Bucharest, Kingdom of Romania
- Died: March 7, 2004 (aged 84); Bucharest, Romania
- Resting place: Filantropia Israelite Cemetery in Bucharest
- Education: University of Bucharest
- Children: Irina Sanda Cajal-Marin
- Awards: Order of the Star of Romania
- Scientific career
- Institutions: Biologist; Politician

Nicolae Cajal (October 1, 1919, in Bucharest – March 7, 2004) was a Romanian Jewish physician, academic, politician, and philanthropist. He was the president of Federation Jewish Communities of Romania from 1994 until his death.

== Biography ==
Cajal held a Ph.D. degree in virology and chaired the Ștefan S. Nicolau Virology Research Center in Bucharest for years. He was a Member of the Romanian Academy, the Romanian Medical Sciences Academy, the British Royal Society of Medicine, and the New York Academy of Sciences. From 1966, he was an expert for the World Health Organization. In 1944, Cajal worked as an intern in the hospital laboratories, in the laboratories of the bacteriology department of the Medical Faculty of Bucharest, and since 1945 at the department of inframicrobiology - virusology.

As a specialist in virology, Cajal was a disciple of Ștefan S. Nicolau, founder of the Romanian School of Virology. His contributions were published in over 400 scientific papers.

In 1966, Cajal became a professor and head of the virology department at the Institute of Medicine and Pharmacy of Bucharest, having passed through all the didactic degrees, being, in turn, through the competition, trainer, assistant, head of works, lecturer. Starting in 1967, Cajal was the director of the Institute of Virusology of the Romanian Academy.

Cajal was an active member of civil society, involved in improving awareness of war crimes carried out in World War II Romania and of the genocide in Transnistria and other occupied areas (see Romania during World War II).

Between 1990 and 1992, he was a senator for Bucharest, representing the National Salvation Front, the new moderate-Socialist government party after the Romanian Revolution. In his parliamentary activity, Cajal was a member of the parliamentary groups of friendship with the People's Republic of China, the State of Israel, and with the French Senate.

He was elected as a correspondent member in 1963 and in 1990 a full member of the Romanian Academy. He was vice-president of the Romanian Academy (1990-1994), president of the Medical Sciences Section and president of the M. H. Elias Foundation. He was a member of the New York Academy of Sciences and Doctor Honoris Causa of the Universities of Oradea (1994), Timișoara (1995), Cluj-Napoca (1995), and Iași (1996).
