= Eugène Ionesco =

Romanian-French playwright (1909–1994)

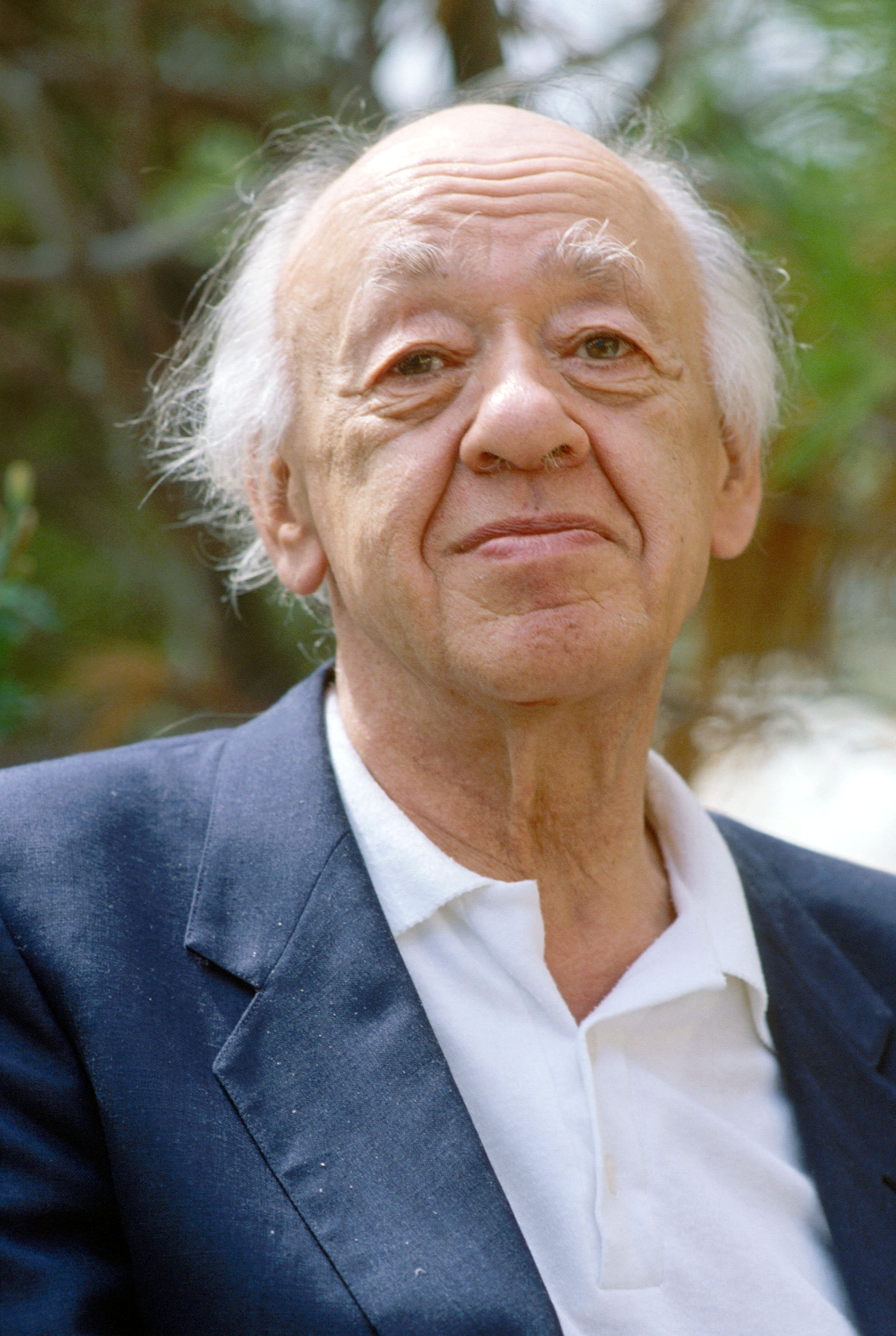
- Ionesco in 1993
- Born: Eugen Ionescu; 26 November 1909; Slatina, Kingdom of Romania
- Died: 28 March 1994 (aged 84); Paris, France
- Resting place: Cimetière du Montparnasse, Paris
- Occupations: Playwright, dramatist
- Writing career
- Period: 1931–1994
- Genre: Theatre
- Movements: Avant-garde; Theatre of the absurd

Eugène Ionesco (/jəˈnɛskoʊ/; French: [øʒɛn jɔnɛsko]; born Eugen Ionescu, Romanian: [e.uˈdʒen joˈnesku]; 26 November 1909 – 28 March 1994) was a Romanian-French playwright who wrote mostly in French, and was one of the foremost figures of the French avant-garde theatre in the 20th century. Ionesco instigated a revolution in ideas and techniques of drama, beginning with his "anti play", The Bald Soprano, which contributed to the beginnings of what is known as the Theatre of the Absurd. He wrote a number of plays that, following the ideas of the philosopher Albert Camus, explore concepts of absurdism and surrealism. He was made a member of the Académie française in 1970, and was awarded the 1970 Austrian State Prize for European Literature, and the 1973 Jerusalem Prize.

== Biography ==
Ionesco was born in Slatina, Romania. His father belonged to the Orthodox Christian church. His mother was of French and Romanian heritage. According to some sources, her faith was Protestant (the faith into which her father was born and to which her originally Greek Orthodox Christian mother had converted). According to other sources, his mother had Jewish ancestry; however, this has been contested by his niece. Eugène was baptized into the Orthodox Christian faith. Many sources cite his birthdate as 1912, this error being due to vanity on the part of Ionesco himself, who wanted the year of his birth to coincide with that of when his idol, Romanian playwright Caragiale, died.

He spent most of his childhood in France and, while there, had an experience he claimed affected his perception of the world more significantly than any other. As Deborah B. Gaensbauer describes in Eugène Ionesco Revisited, "Walking in summer sunshine in a white-washed provincial village under an intense blue sky, [Ionesco] was profoundly altered by the light." He was struck very suddenly with a feeling of intense luminosity, the feeling of floating off the ground and an overwhelming feeling of well-being. When he "floated" back to the ground and the "light" left him, he saw that the real world in comparison was full of decay, corruption and meaningless repetitive action. This also coincided with the revelation that death takes everyone in the end. Much of his later work, reflecting this new perception, demonstrates a disgust for the tangible world, a distrust of communication, and the subtle sense that a better world lies just beyond our reach. Echoes of this experience can also be seen in references and themes in many of his important works: characters pining for an unattainable "city of lights" (The Killer, The Chairs) or perceiving a world beyond (A Stroll in the Air); characters granted the ability to fly (A Stroll in the Air, Amédée, Victims of Duty); the banality of the world which often leads to depression (the Bérenger character); ecstatic revelations of beauty within a pessimistic framework (Amédée, The Chairs, the Bérenger character); and the inevitability of death (Exit the King).

He returned to Romania with his father and mother in 1925 after his parents divorced. There he attended Saint Sava National College, after which he studied French Literature at the University of Bucharest from 1928 to 1933 and qualified as a teacher of French. While there he met Emil Cioran and Mircea Eliade, and the three became lifelong friends.

In 1936, Ionesco married Rodica Burileanu. They had one daughter, Marie-France Ionesco, for whom he wrote a number of unconventional children's stories. With his family, he returned to France in 1938 to complete his doctoral thesis. Caught by the outbreak of World War II in 1939, he returned to Romania, but soon changed his mind and, with the help of friends, obtained travel documents which allowed him to return to France in 1942, where he remained during the rest of the war, living in Marseille and then moving with his family to Paris after its liberation.

== Literary career ==
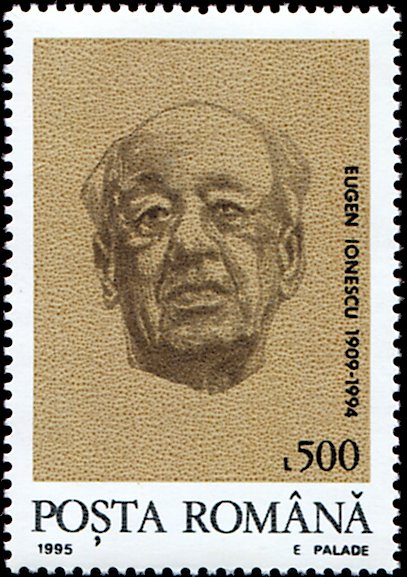
Romanian postage stamp depicting Ionesco

=== Writing in Romania ===
Though best known as a playwright, plays were not his first chosen medium. He started writing poetry and criticism, publishing in several Romanian journals. Two early writings of note are Nu, a book criticizing many other writers, including prominent Romanian poets, and Hugoliade, or, The grotesque and tragic life of Victor Hugo a satirical biography mocking Victor Hugo's status as a great figure in French literature. The Hugoliade includes exaggerated retellings of the most scandalous episodes in Hugo's life and contains prototypes for many of Ionesco's later themes: the ridiculous authoritarian character, the false worship of language.

=== Origins of his first play ===
Ionesco began his theatre career later in life; he did not write his first play until 1948 (La Cantatrice chauve, first performed in 1950 with the English title The Bald Soprano). At the age of 40, he decided to learn English using the Assimil method, conscientiously copying whole sentences in order to memorize them. Re-reading them, he began to feel that he was not learning English, rather he was discovering some astonishing truths such as the fact that there are seven days in a week, that the ceiling is up and the floor is down; things which he already knew, but which suddenly struck him as being as stupefying as they were indisputably true.

This feeling intensified with the introduction in later lessons of the characters known as "Mr. and Mrs. Smith". To her husband's astonishment, Mrs. Smith informed him that they had several children, that they lived in the vicinity of London, that their name was Smith, that Mr. Smith was a clerk, and that they had a servant, Mary, who was English like themselves. What was remarkable about Mrs. Smith, Ionesco thought, was her eminently methodical procedure in her quest for truth. For Ionesco, the clichés and truisms of the conversation primer disintegrated into wild caricature and parody with language itself disintegrating into disjointed fragments of words. Ionesco set about translating this experience into a play, La Cantatrice Chauve, which was performed for the first time in 1950 under the direction of Nicolas Bataille. It was far from a success and went unnoticed until a few established writers and critics, among them Jean Anouilh and Raymond Queneau, championed the play.

=== Early plays ===
Ionesco's earliest theatrical works, considered to be his most innovative, were one-act plays or extended sketches: La Cantatrice chauve translated as The Bald Soprano or The Bald Prima Donna (written 1948), Jacques ou la soumission translated as Jack, or The Submission (1950), La Leçon translated as The Lesson (1950), Les Salutations translated as Salutations (1950), Les Chaises translated as The Chairs (1951), L'Avenir est dans les oeufs translated as The Future is in Eggs (1951), Victimes du devoir translated as Victims of Duty (1952) and, finally, Le Nouveau locataire translated as The New Tenant (1953). These absurdist sketches, to which he gave such descriptions as "anti-play" (anti-pièce in French) express modern feelings of alienation and the impossibility and futility of communication with surreal comic force, parodying the conformism of the bourgeoisie and conventional theatrical forms. In them Ionesco rejects a conventional story-line as their basis, instead taking their dramatic structure from accelerating rhythms and/or cyclical repetitions. He disregards psychology and coherent dialogue, thereby depicting a dehumanized world with mechanical, puppet-like characters who speak in non-sequiturs. Language becomes rarefied, with words and material objects gaining a life of their own, increasingly overwhelming the characters and creating a sense of menace.

=== The full-length plays ===
With Tueur sans gages translated as The Killer (1959; his second full-length play, the first being Amédée, ou Comment s'en débarrasser in 1954), Ionesco began to explore more sustained dramatic situations featuring more humanized characters. Notably this includes Bérenger, a central character in a number of Ionesco's plays, the last of which is Le Piéton de l'air translated as A Stroll in the Air.

Bérenger is a semi-autobiographical figure expressing Ionesco's wonderment and anguish at the strangeness of reality. He is comically naïve, engaging the audience's sympathy. In The Killer he encounters death in the figure of a serial killer. In Rhinocéros he watches his friends turning into rhinoceroses one by one until he alone stands unchanged against this mass movement. It is in this play that Ionesco most forcefully expresses his horror of ideological conformism, inspired by the rise of the fascist Iron Guard in Romania in the 1930s. Le Roi se meurt translated as Exit the King (1962) shows him as King Bérenger I, an everyman figure who struggles to come to terms with his own death.

=== Later works ===
Ionesco's later work has generally received less attention. This includes La Soif et la faim translated as Hunger and Thirst (1966), Jeux de massacre (1971), Macbett (1972, a free adaptation of Shakespeare's Macbeth) and Ce formidable bordel (1973).

Ionesco also wrote his only novel, The Hermit, during this later period. It was first published in 1975.

Apart from the libretto for the opera Maximilien Kolbe (music by Dominique Probst) which has been performed in five countries, produced for television and recorded for release on CD, Ionesco did not write for the stage after Voyage chez les morts in 1981. However, La Cantatrice chauve is still playing at the Théâtre de la Huchette today, having moved there in 1952. It holds the world record for the play that has been staged continuously in the same theatre for the longest time.

=== Theoretical writings ===
Like Shaw and Brecht, Ionesco contributed to the theatre with his theoretical writings (Wellwarth, 33). Ionesco wrote mainly in attempts to correct critics whom he felt misunderstood his work and therefore wrongly influenced his audience. In doing so, Ionesco articulated ways in which he thought contemporary theatre should be reformed (Wellwarth, 33). Notes and Counter Notes is a collection of Ionesco's writings, including musings on why he chose to write for the theatre and direct responses to his contemporary critics.

In the first section, titled "Experience of the Theatre", Ionesco claimed to have hated going to the theatre as a child because it gave him "no pleasure or feeling of participation" (Ionesco, 15). He wrote that the problem with realistic theatre is that it is less interesting than theatre that invokes an "imaginative truth", which he found to be much more interesting and freeing than the "narrow" truth presented by strict realism (Ionesco, 15). He claimed that "drama that relies on simple effects is not necessarily drama simplified" (Ionesco, 28). Notes and Counter Notes also reprints a heated war of words between Ionesco and Kenneth Tynan based on Ionesco's beliefs and Ionesco's hatred for Brecht and Brechtian theatre.

=== Literary context ===
Ionesco is often considered a writer of the Theatre of the Absurd, a label originally given to him by Martin Esslin in his book of the same name. Esslin placed Ionesco alongside contemporaries Samuel Beckett, Jean Genet, and Arthur Adamov, calling this informal group "absurd" on the basis of Albert Camus' concept of the absurd. In Esslin's view, Beckett and Ionesco better captured the meaninglessness of existence in their plays than works by Camus or Sartre. Because of this loose association, Ionesco is often mislabeled an existentialist. Ionesco claimed in Notes and Counter Notes that he was not an existentialist and often criticized existentialist figurehead Jean-Paul Sartre. Although Ionesco knew Beckett and honored his work, the French group of playwrights was far from an organized movement.

Ionesco on the metaphysics of death in Through Parisian Eyes: Reflections on Contemporary French Arts and Culture by Melinda Camber Porter: "Death is our main problem and all others are less important. It is the wall and the limit. It is the only inescapable alienation; it gives us a sense of our limits. But the ignorance of ourselves and of others to which we are condemned is just as worrying. In the final analysis, we don't know what we're doing. Nevertheless, in all my work there is an element of hope and an appeal to others."

Ionesco claimed instead an affinity for ’Pataphysics and its creator Alfred Jarry. He was also a great admirer of the Dadaists and Surrealists, especially his fellow countryman Tristan Tzara. Ionesco became friends with André Breton, whom he revered. In Present Past, Past Present, Ionesco wrote "Breton taught us to destroy the walls of the real that separate us from reality, to participate in being so as to live as if it were the first day of creation, a day that would every day be the first day of new creations." Raymond Queneau, a former associate of Breton and a champion of Ionesco's work, was a member of the Collège de ’Pataphysique and a founder of Oulipo, two groups with which Ionesco was associated. Politically, Ionesco expressed sympathy with the left-libertarian Transnational Radical Party of Marco Pannella.

== Honours and awards ==
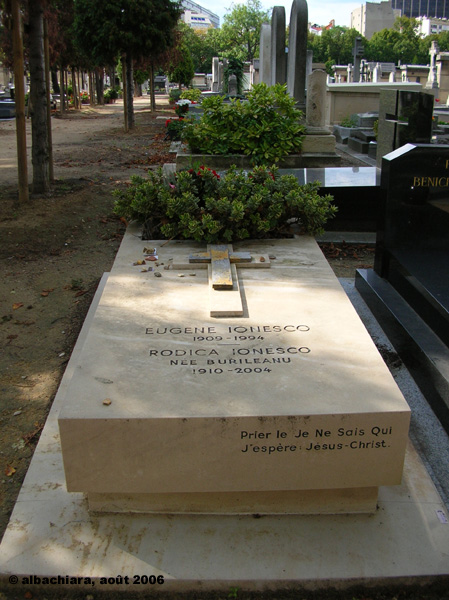
Ionesco's grave in Montparnasse cemetery, Paris. The inscription translates: Pray to the I don't-know-who: Jesus Christ, I hope

Ionesco was made a member of the Académie française in 1970. He also received numerous awards including Tours Festival Prize for film, 1959; Prix Italia, 1963; Society of Authors Theatre Prize, 1966; Grand Prix National for theatre, 1969; Monaco Grand Prix, 1969; Austrian State Prize for European Literature, 1970; Jerusalem Prize, 1973; and honorary Doctoral Degrees from New York University and the Universities of Leuven, Warwick and Tel Aviv. He was nominated for the Nobel Prize in Literature eight times.

== Death ==
Eugène Ionesco died at age 84 on 28 March 1994 and is buried in the Cimetière du Montparnasse in Paris.

In 2009, the Romanian Academy granted posthumous membership to Ionesco.

== Theatrical works ==
Long plays

- Amédée, or How to Get Rid of It (1954)
- The Killer (1958)
- Rhinoceros (1959)
- Exit the King (1962)
- Stroll in the Air (1962)
- Hunger and Thirst (1964)
- The Killing Game aka Here Comes a Chopper (1970)
- Macbett (1972)
- Oh, What a Bloody Circus aka A Hell of a Mess (1973)
- Man with Bags (1977)
- Journeys Among the Dead (1980)

Short plays

- The Bald Soprano (1950)
- Salutations (1950)
- The Lesson (1951)
- The Motor Show (1951)
- The Chairs (1952)
- The Leader (1953)
- Victims of Duty (1953)
- Maid to Marry (1953)
- Jack, or The Submission (1955)
- The New Tenant (1955)
- The Picture (1955)
- Improvisation or the Shepherd's Chameleon (1956)
- The Foot of the Wall (1956)
- The Future is in Eggs, or It Takes All Sorts to Make a World (1957)
- Foursome (1959)
- Frenzy for Two, or More (1962)
- The Oversight (1966)

Vignettes

- The Duel (1971)
- Double Act (1971)

Monologue

- How to Prepare a Hard-Boiled Egg (1966)

Ballet scenario

- Learning to Walk (1960)

Opera libretto

- Maximilien Kolbe (1987)

== Other writings ==
Fiction

- The Colonel's Photograph and Other Stories (1962)
- The Hermit (1973)
- Stories 1, 2, 3, 4 (2012)

Non-fiction

- Hugoliad, or The Grotesque and Tragic Life of Victor Hugo (1935, published 1982)
- Notes and Counter-Notes (1962)
- Fragments of a Journal (1967)
- Present Past Past Present (1968)

Film scenarios

- Anger (1961)
- La vase (Slime) (1971)

Television scenario

- The Hard Boiled Egg (1966)

== Untranslated writings ==
Non-fiction

- Nu (1934)
- Decouvertes: Les Sentiers de la Creation (1969)
- Antidotes (1977)
- Un homme en question (1979)
- Le blanc et le noir (1981)
- La quête intermittente (1987)

Plays

- Le vicomte (1950)
- La nièce-épouse (1953)
- Exercices de conversation et de diction françaises pour étudiants américains (1966)

Ballet scenario

- Le jeune homme à marier (1966)

Poetry

- Elegii pentru ființe mici (1931)

== See also ==
- List of Romanian playwrights
