= Ștefan S. Nicolau =

Romanian physician

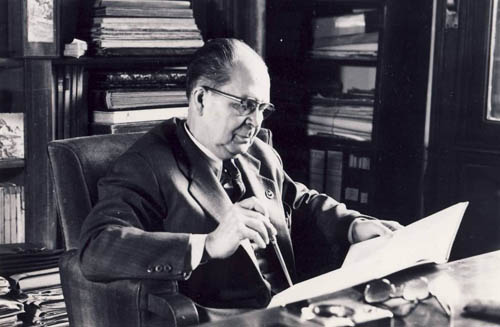
- Photograph of Nicolau
- Born: February 15, 1896; Bucharest, Kingdom of Romania
- Died: October 15, 1967 (aged 71); Bucharest, Socialist Republic of Romania
- Education: Matei Basarab High School
- Alma mater: University of Medicine and Pharmacy, Cluj; Sorbonne University
- Known for: Founder of the Romanian school of virology
- Children: Claude Nicolau; Käty van der Mije-Nicolau
- Awards: Montyon Prize (1935)
- Scientific career
- Fields: Virology
- Institutions: Pasteur Institute; National Institute for Medical Research; University of Iași; University of Medicine and Pharmacy, Bucharest
- Thesis: (1925)
- Notable students: Nicolae Cajal

Ștefan S. Nicolau (15 February 1896 – 15 October 1967) was a Romanian physician who is considered to be the founder of the Romanian school of virology. In 1948, he was elected a titular member of the Romanian Academy.

== Biography ==
He was born in Bucharest and graduated from the Matei Basarab High School in 1913. He started his medical studies at the University of Bucharest, but was conscripted into the Army once Romania entered World War I in August 1916. He served under Mihai Ciucă as a medical second lieutenant on the Moldavian front and worked at the 2nd Hospital for Contagious Diseases. After the war, Nicolau obtained his MD degree in 1920 from the Faculty of Medicine in Cluj.

He pursued his medical training in Paris, where he worked at the Pasteur Institute from 1920 to 1939, where he started as Assistant, then advancing to Associate, and finally to Head of Laboratory. Nicolau obtained his Ph.D. from Sorbonne University in 1925. At the Pasteur Institute, he was a collaborator of Constantin Levaditi. The two of them published in 1922 a series of articles in which new properties of viral agents were established, including ultrafiltrability (passage through the pores of a collodion membrane) and the antigenic properties of killed and replicative viruses. In his studies, Nicolau underscored the macromolecular nature of viruses and the significance of their genomic nucleic acid.

From 1927 to 1931 he worked as a researcher at the National Institute for Medical Research in London. Some of his most cited publications date from this period, when he investigated the Bornaviruses, in collaboration with Ian Alfred Galloway. The two were the first researchers to conduct experimental studies of the Borna disease in sheep and cattle and to describe the characteristics of this enzootic encephalomyelitis. Nicolau and Galloway were also the first to identify the sensitivity of the Borna disease virus to lipid solvents, an observation confirmed more than 70 years later.

Nicolau returned to Romania in 1939, where he became a professor at the Faculty of Medicine of the University of Iași and in 1942 at the Carol Davila University of Medicine and Pharmacy in Bucharest. In 1949 he founded the Institute of Virology of the Romanian Academy (one of the first establishments of its kind in Europe). Together with his disciples, Radu Portocală and Nicolae Cajal, he began to recruit researchers to work on isolation and cultivation of human and animal viruses. He was the director of the institute until his death, when he was succeeded by Cajal. The institute now bears Nicolau's name.

He was the recipient of the Bellion Prize in 1926, the Bréant Prize in 1930, and the Montyon Prize in 1935. In 1946 he was elected corresponding member of the Romanian Academy; he became titular member in 1948, and served until 1966 as president of the Medical Sciences section of the academy.

His son, Claude, was born in Paris in 1936 and became a professor of biochemistry in Romania, France, and the United States. His daughter, Alexandra, was born in Bucharest in 1940, and later, known as Käty van der Mije-Nicolau, became a chess player and Woman Grandmaster.

Nicolau died in Bucharest in 1967. A street in Sector 3 of the city is named after him.

== Selected publications ==
=== Research reports ===
- Levaditi, Constantin; Nicolau, Ștefan (1923). "Vaccine et néoplasmes". Annales de l'Institut Pasteur. 37 (5): 443–447.
- Levaditi, Constantin; Nicolau, Ștefan (1924), L'étiologie de l'encéphalite épizootique du lapin: dans ses rapports avec l'étude expérimentale de l'encéphalite léthargique: encephalitozoon cuniculi (nov. spec.), Libraires de l'Académie de Médecine
- Nicolau, S.; Galloway, I. A. (1927). "Preliminary note on the experimental study of enzootic encephalo-myelitis (Borna Disease)". British Journal of Experimental Pathology. 8 (4): 336–341. PMC 2047960.
- Nicolau, S.; Galloway, I. A. (1928), "Borna disease and enzootic encephalo-myelitis of sheep and cattle", Medical Research Council Special Report Series, 121: 7–90

=== Monographs ===
- Nicolau, Ștefan S. (1954). Hepatitele inframicrobiene [Viral hepatitis]. București: Editura Academiei Republicii Populare Romîne. OCLC 14659226.
- Nicolau, Ștefan S. (1955). Cancer și virusuri; cîteva considerații privitoare la ipoteza virotică a cancerului [Cancer and viruses – remarks on the cancer viral etiology]. București: Editura Academiei Republicii Populare Romîne. OCLC 14656107.
- Nicolau, Ștefan S. (1956). Elemente de inframicrobiologie generală [Basic inframicrobiology]. București: Editura Academiei Republicii Populare Romîne. OCLC 14683805.
