= Jack, or The Submission =

- Original language: French
- Written by: Eugène Ionesco
- Genre: Theatre of the Absurd

Premiere
- Date: 1955

Jack, or The Submission (French: Jacques ou la soumission) is an absurdist play by Eugène Ionesco, the first of two about Jack and his family (the second being The Future is in Eggs), all of whom are named after Jack (Father Jack, Mother Jack, etc.).

The thrust of the narrative involves Jack's arranged marriage to Roberta and, when the first Roberta is not satisfactory, Roberta II. The play contains nonsensical exchanges and strings of clichés, similar to The Bald Soprano, and the sort of surreal conceits (Roberta's multiple noses, for example) common in many of Ionesco's later plays.
