= Salutations (play) =

1950 Sketch by Eugène Ionesco

- Written by: Eugène Ionesco
- Original language: French
- Genre: Theatre of the Absurd

Premiere
- Date premiered: 1950

Salutations (French: Les Salutations) is a sketch written by Eugène Ionesco in 1950. Three men, after being asked "How are you?" greet each other continuously through different adverbs and each responding to the civilities of the previous questioner. Typically, each character would end with "And you?" after each adverb. There are also several spectators commenting about the characters on stage.
