= Constantin Levaditi =

Romanian–French physician, microbiologist, a major figure in virology and immunology

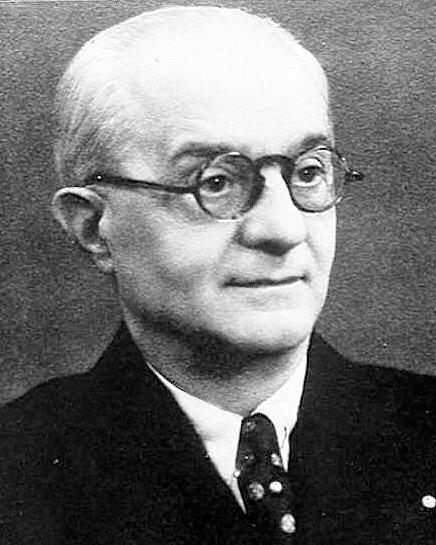
- Born: 1 August 1874; Galați, Romania
- Died: 5 September 1953 (aged 79); Paris, France
- Citizenship: Romanian; French (1908)
- Education: Carol Davila University of Medicine and Pharmacy; Collège de France
- Known for: Co-discoverer of the poliovirus Treatment of syphilis by bismuth
- Spouse: Elena Istrati (1882–1969)
- Children: Marthe Aglae Dite Ohé Levaditi (1904–1983); Jean Levaditi (1906–1991) – head of the department of histopathology at the Pasteur Institute
- Parents: Spyridon Livaditis (father); Ioana Ștefănescu (mother)
- Awards: Cameron Prize for Therapeutics of the University of Edinburgh (1928)
- Scientific career
- Fields: Microbiology; Virology; Immunology
- Workplaces: Pasteur Institute – Paris; Carol Davila University of Medicine and Pharmacy – Bucharest; Babeș-Bolyai University – Cluj
- Doctoral advisor: Victor Babeș

Constantin Levaditi (1 August 1874 – 5 September 1953) was a Romanian physician and microbiologist, a major figure in virology and immunology, especially in the study of poliomyelitis and syphilis.

== Biography ==
Constantin Levaditi was born in Galați. His father, Spyridon Livaditis, of Greek descent (from Macedonia) was 30 years old and working as a customs officer. His mother, Ioana Ștefănescu, then aged 18 years, was the daughter of peasants from Focșani. The family name originates from the name of the town of Livadia, a town 150 kilometres (93 mi) north of Athens (Livaditis means one who comes from Livadia). The researcher Pierre Lépine [fr] (1901–1987) reported that Spyridon Livaditis was a member of the Filiki Eteria (Society of Friends), established to organize the Greek Revolution of 1821 against the Ottoman Empire under the leadership of Prince Alexander Ypsilantis. However, after he had graduated from the Medical School, Constantin altered his surname from Livaditis to Levaditi, which is the alternative spelling of the town (Livadia is also Levadia).

Constantin Levaditi had a difficult childhood due to financial problems in the family. In September 1880, he went to the "Cuza Vodă" primary school in Galați, and at the same time started work at the store of his uncle Ștefan Ștefănescu. After the untimely death of his parents in 1883, Constantin's aunt Efrosini, a member of his father's family, took custody and he continued his basic education in Bucharest. He studied at Matei Basarab High School in Bucharest and at the Carol Davila University of Medicine and Pharmacy (1892–1896), where he studied under Victor Babeș. He had the opportunity to become familiar with a medical environment, as his aunt was a laundry worker at the "Brâncovenesc" Hospital in Bucharest. Thus, it was in a medical atmosphere that the future scientist grew up, a good student, gifted in mathematics, a lover of music and the theatre. His medical studies completed, Levaditi, an intern at the hospital, left it to his colleagues to make the ward rounds and spent his entire days in the laboratory. This is how he was noticed by Victor Babeș, of whom, in 1897, he became the assistant at the Bacteriological Institute. But he decided to leave for France: in 1898, he landed in Paris. After a passage in the laboratory of the academician Charles Bouchard, at the Hôtel-Dieu, he was, in 1899, assistant to Albert Charrin at the Collège de France.

Levaditi continued his postgraduate studies in 1900 and 1901 in Frankfurt with Paul Ehrlich who was considered the father of modern chemotherapy. In the spring of 1901 Levaditi, following the advice of the physician John Kantakouzinos, had the great opportunity to work in the Élie Metchnikoff Laboratory at the Pasteur Institute. In 1902, he completed his doctoral thesis entitled Contribution a l’étude des Mastzellen et de la Mastzellen-Leycocytose (Contribution to the study of the mast cells and the mast cells-leucocytes), which was considered a pioneering contribution to haematology. Two years later, in 1904, Emile Roux recognized Levaditi's abilities and enthusiasm and appointed him director of an independent laboratory at the Pasteur Institute.

He will remain at the Pasteur Institute until retirement age. His choice is made: if he will remain sentimentally attached to his native Romania, it is France that has become his homeland because he has found there not only the means to work, but the intellectual atmosphere and the spiritual climate where he will be able to realize. He will return to Romania for a short trip in 1903, when he married Helen, the younger daughter of Dr. Constantin Istrati, and in 1920, as a guest lecturer at the University of Cluj.

His enterprising research in immunology led to nomination as Professor in 1924. The American Professor Simon Flexner proposed him as director of the Rockefeller Institute for Medical Research in New York, but Levaditi refused politely. Meanwhile, Levaditi taught at many Universities all over the world including London, Madrid, Barcelona, New York and Philadelphia.

The work of C. Levaditi extends over more than half a century and touches on domains that are united by the logical chain of thought and the development of research. His doctoral dissertation in medicine (1902) made Levaditi a cytologist and an immunologist. Pathological histology holds a considerable place in all his experimental work, oriented towards the solution of immunological problems raised by the various diseases he studied.

Constantin Levaditi dedicated an important part of his research to the study of syphilis, a scourge of the 20th century. From 1907, when he began to investigate venereal disease systematically, he emphasized the importance of studying this widespread problem. Levaditi studied the invasive capability of Treponema pallidum into the target-organs and at the same time described the technique of staining this bacterium (the Levaditi–Manouelian method). He and Auguste-Charles Marie traced T. pallidum in the brainstem of patients suffering from neurosyphilis, a discovery that confirmed the infiltrating capacity of the organism and opened up new horizons for experimental study in animals. The two pioneer researchers also made the very significant observation that not only the antigens of T. pallidum, but also extracts of normal tissues from patients who had been infected by syphilis, gave a positive complement fixation reaction. This observation, in combination with the perfection of the serum detection method (the Wasserman Test), contributed to the discovery of autoantibodies and the phenomenon of autoimmunity.

In his studies of syphilis, Levaditi introduced new techniques in serology, and recommended bismuth in its treatment. Entering World War I as a volunteer, he attained the rank of captain and was detached to serve with the ambulances of la Panne. In this capacity he worked on developing an antitetanus vaccine and studied streptococcus in wounds.

Parallel to these works, which after his retirement from the Institut Pasteur in 1940, he continued at the Alfred-Fournier Institute, from which he had, when it was created in 1932, received the scientific direction, C. Levaditi carried out the research on viruses which made him the founder and leader of the French school in the field of ultraviruses. Levaditi was almost the first and, for a long time, the only person in France to study viruses systematically. C. Levaditi's works on viruses are numerous

Levaditi also carried out research on poliomyelitis and contributed to the clarification of the epidemiological factors causing the disease. He cooperated with the Austrian Karl Landsteiner who was awarded the Nobel Prize in 1930 and who was considered a notable modern immunologist, known for the discovery of the ABO and Rhesus blood group system. Their main areas of cooperation were in the study of scarlet fever and especially of poliomyelitis.

With Karl Landsteiner, he discovered in 1909 the presence of the poliovirus in tissues other than nervous. He expanded on these studies during a poliomyelitis outbreak in Sweden (in 1913), working with Scandinavian researchers (among them Karl Oskar Medin); he was able to isolate the poliovirus on tissue explant and made precious observations on its characteristics. Together with Carl Kling, he authored the first monograph dedicated to the disease, La Poliomyélite aiguë épidémique (1913). His work was the basis for the development of the polio vaccine by Jonas Salk and Albert Sabin.

Apart from these major subjects, Levaditi touched on all branches of microbiology: tuberculosis, protozooses, immunology, each time with success, always with virtuosity, often as an innovator as in the study of toxoplasmosis or during the discovery of Streptobacillus moniliformis, agent of murine polyarthritis and epidemic erythema multiforme in humans. Levaditi's scientific work has been characterized as ‘bridging the gap between nineteenth century pathology and twentieth century immunology’. Levaditi exercised an influence on both specialties. According to the historian John Paul, ‘there was scarcely a microbiological laboratory in Europe that did not boast of at least one worker who had been trained in Paris by Levaditi.’

Levaditi spent almost his entire career at the Pasteur Institute. Though his was the only career beside Landsteiner's to span the age of Pasteur and modern times, he was not well recognized in the history of poliovirus research. Moreover, unlike Landsteiner, Levaditi never relinquished his interest in poliovirus research after the discovery of the aetiologic agent of poliomyelitis by Landsteiner and Popper in 1908. His colleague John Paul notes that Levaditi did not live to see the widespread success of poliomyelitis prevention through immunological approaches. Though, he did live to witness the confirmation of the work he had conducted with Kling and Lépine, which represented an important recognition of his contributions to the field.

In 1919, he returned to Romania. He stayed there for three years to teach at the University of Medicine and Pharmacy of Bucharest before holding, in 1921, at the request of the Romanian government, the chair of microbiology of the Faculty of Medicine of Babeș-Bolyai University in Cluj. After 1920, Levaditi, assisted by Ștefan S. Nicolau, elaborated at the Department of Bacteriology of the Faculty of Medicine in Cluj projects related to the study of other viruses: herpesviruses, vaccine virus and rabies virus group. The investigations performed from rabies outlined an important chapter of the virological research on: the neurotropic ectodermoses. Levaditi introduced the term “neuroprobasia”, which defines the progression of viruses along the nerve tracts.

Constantin Levaditi was a member of the Académie Nationale de Médecine and an honorary member of the Romanian Academy. In 1928, he was awarded the Cameron Prize for Therapeutics of the University of Edinburgh. Throughout his career, Levaditi published more than 1,200 notes, articles, and monographs.

== Brief presentation ==
=== Studies ===
- "Cuza Vodă" primary school in Galati (1880);
- "Matei Basarab" High School in Bucharest (baccalaureate in 1892);
- University of Medicine and Pharmacy from Bucharest (1892–1898).

=== Socio-professional activity ===
- internal physician in a hospital in Bucharest (1896);
- preparator at the Institute of Bacteriology in Bucharest, working during the student period with Professor Victor Babeș (1897);
- he went to Paris with letters of recommendation from Professor Victor Babeș, becoming an assistant to Professor Albert Charrin in the laboratory of general and experimental pathology led by him at the Collège de France, during which Levaditi elaborated 16 original scientific papers (1898–1899);
- assistant to Professor Paul Ehrlich at the Königliches Institut für experimentelle Therapie in Frankfurt am Main (1900–1901);
- preparator at the Pasteur Institute in Paris, actively participating in the development of pastoral doctrine as a student of Élie Metchnikoff and Émile Roux (1902–1905);
- assistant at the Pasteur Institute in Paris (1905–1910);
- he addressed a request to the Faculty of Medicine in Bucharest, requesting a lecturer or professor position, the request was accepted, but without being offered a laboratory for research, which made him resign (1906);
- head of the laboratory at the Pasteur Institute (1910–1912);
- participated with Carl Kling in a scientific mission, researching the poliomyelitis epidemic in Sweden (1912);
- head of department and scientific director, and from 1926, professor at the Pasteur Institute in Paris (1912–1940);
- he taught advanced postgraduate courses at the Pasteur Institute in Paris (1912–1931);
- mobilized in the First World War, he was initially assigned at a field hospital in Orléans, then he was appointed head of the diagnostic laboratory of the Military Hospital in Orléans (1914–1915);
- head of the laboratory of an ambulance station near the city of Reims, being promoted to the rank of captain;
- transferred to the ambulance of the Belgian army in La Panne (1915–1918);
- obtained for Romania a valuable medical aid for the Romanian army during the First World War (1915);
- Professor at the Department of General and Experimental Pathology of the Faculty of Medicine in Cluj (1920–1921);
- screenwriter and director (together with director Eugen Gyulai Farcaş) of the first feature-length medical film in Romania, of anti-syphilitic propaganda, shot in Cluj, "Din grozăviile lumii" (1920);
- associate professor at the Faculty of Medicine in Madrid and Barcelona (1923–1924);
- lectured under the auspices of "The Harben Lectures" in London (1923);
- appointed permanent professor at the "École de sérologie appliquée" in Paris (1927);
- violinist and then conductor of the Doctors' Orchestra of Paris;
- lectured at the University of Edinburgh and under the auspices of "The Harvey Lecture" in New York (1928);
- together with Émile Roux, he carried out a scientific expedition in the Bas-Rhin department (France), where a poliomyelitis epidemic had broken out (1931);
- held a cycle of conferences in Locarno (Switzerland), at the invitation of the American "Tomarkin" Foundation (1932);
- scientific director of the French Institute of Sifiligraphy "Alfred Fournier" (1932–1953);
- he published in specialized magazines from France, Germany and England and supported over 100 communications of original scientific works (1933–1935);
- in the Second World War he entered the army as a consultant doctor in the Health Service of the XV Military Region in Orléans (1939);
- during the Nazi occupation, he evaded offers of collaboration with the Hitlerites, ending up being threatened with "the investigation of his activity directed against the new order", but he managed to publish and support over 70 scientific works.

=== Affiliation ===
- corresponding member (1910), honorary member (1926) of the Romanian Academy; this quality was withdrawn by the communist regime following the reorganization of the Romanian Academy into the R.P.R. Academy (Aug. 1948); he was reinstated (1990);
- member and secretary of the Society of Exotic Pathology (1912–1919);
- full member of the Académie Nationale de Médecine in Paris (1928);
- full member and vice-president of the Society of Biology in Paris (1931);
- president of the French Society of Applied Serology (1931).

=== Notable works ===
- the discoverer, together with Victor Babeș, of the actinomycotic form of the tuberculosis bacillus (1897);
- discovered a new flagellate parasite of silkworms which he named Herpetomonas bombicis (1905);
- he developed a method for detecting the syphilitic spirochete (the Levaditi-Manouélian method) and discovered a new type of spirochete (Spirocheta gracilis) (1906);
- founder of experimental virology: together with the Austrian doctor Karl Landsteiner, he demonstrated that poliomyelitis can be inoculated to superior monkeys (chimpanzee) and that this disease is caused by a filterable virus (1909);
- together with Carl Kling demonstrated that the poliomyelitis virus is transmitted through the digestive tract (1912);
- the first European to grow the poliomyelitis virus on tissue fragments in vitro, an achievement that precedes the preparation of the poliomyelitis vaccine (1913);
- first physician to show utility of streptococcal vaccines in war surgery (1918);
- made one of the first European scientific propaganda films against venereal danger (1920);
- created together with Ştefan S. Nicolau a new vaccine against smallpox, "Neurovaccina Levaditi-Nicolau" (1922);
- together with R. Sazérac, he discovered the therapeutic properties of bismuth and initiated antiluetic bismuth therapy, later publishing, in Paris, the work Bismuth in the treatment of syphilis (1922);
- he coordinated the chemotherapy team at the Pasteur Institute in Paris, conducting systematic research on 45 elements from the Mendeleev Table, of which 10 were found to be active in syphilis (1927–1931);
- was nominated for the Nobel Prize in Medicine (1928);
- he presented his own vision on how viruses multiply (1939, 1943);
- he was the second researcher in the world, who introduced penicillin in the treatment of syphilis (1944);
- he left behind more than 750 published works, among them: Études sur la poliomyélite aigué épidémique (in collaboration, 1913); Ectodermose neurotropes (1922); Le bismuth dans le traitement de la syphilis (1924); L'hérpès et le zone (1926); Syphilis Prophylaxis (1936).

==== Writings ====
- Debut: Sur la forme actinomycosique du bacille de la tuberculosis, in collaboration with Victor Babeș (Archives des sciences médicales, Paris, 1897);
- La leucocytose et ses granulations (Paris, 1902);
- La nutrition dans ses rapports avec l’immunité (Paris, 1904);
- La réaction des anticorps syphilitiques dans la paralysie générale et le tabès (Paris, 1906), written with A. Marie;
- La syphilis (Paris, 1909), written with F. Roché;
- Traitement de la paralysie générale par injection du sérum savarnisé dans la dure-mère cérébrale (Paris, 1913), written with A. Marie et T. Martel;
- Étude sur le tréponème de la paralysie générale (Paris, 1919), written with A. Marie;
- Les ectodermoses neurotropes, poliomyélite, encéphalite, herpès (Paris, 1922), with preface by E. Roux;
- Vaccine pure cérébrale, virulence pour l’homme, in Comptes rendus hebdomadaires des séances de l’Académie des sciences, 174 (1922), written with S. Nicolau;
- Étude de l’action thérapeutique sur la syphilis (Paris, 1923), written with R. Sazérac;
- Le bismuth dans le traitement de la syphilis (Paris, 1924);
- L’herpès et le zona (Paris, 1926);
- Travaux de microbiologie et de pathologie humaines et animales. 1897–1933 (Paris, 1993);
- Prophylaxie de la syphilis (Paris, 1936);
- Traité des ultravirus des maladies humaines et animales, 2 vols. (Paris, 1943–1948);
- La pénicilline et ses applications thérapeutiques (Paris, 1945);
- Précis de virologie médicale (Paris, 1945);
- La streptomycine et ses applications thérapeutiques, pricipalement dans la tuberculose (Paris, 1946);
- Les antibiotiques autres que la pénicilline (Paris, 1950);
- Le chloramphénicol et ses applications thérapeutiques (Paris, 1951).

Bibliographies of monographs and articles by Levaditi are his Travaux de médecine expérimentale, 1897–1931. Ectodermoses neurotropes, neuroprotozooses, syphilis, chimiothérapie et chimioprévention, phagocytose, immunité, érythème polymorphe, rhumatisme, ergostérol irradié (Paris, 1931); and Titres et travaux. Microbiologie, pathologie humaine et animale, chimiothérapie. 1897–1951 (Paris, 1952).

=== Prizes, awards ===
- "Bréant" Prize of the French Academy of Sciences (1901);
- "Montyon" Prize of the French Academy of Sciences (1902);
- First Prize at the International Exhibition in Strasbourg, on the occasion of the centenary of Pasteur's birth (1922);
- The Great "Cameron" Prize of the University of Edinburgh (1928);
- "Cornovin" Award (1928);
- Prize of the French League Against the Venereal Danger (1929);
- The "John Scott" Medal and Prize of the University of Philadelphia (1929);
- The Grand Prize for Chemotherapy and the "Paul Ehrlich" Gold Medal (1931);
- Commander of the "Legion of Honour" Order (1939).

==== Titles ====
- Scientific title: Doctor of Medicine from the University of Paris, with the thesis „Contribution à l’étude des Mastzellen et de la Mastzellen–Leucocytose” (1902).
- Honorary title: Doctor Honoris Causa of the University of Amsterdam (1932).

== Bibliography ==
- Levaditi, Constantin (1931). Travaux de médecine expérimentale. 1897–1931. Ectodermoses neurotropes. Neuroprotozooses. Syphilis. Chimiothérapie et chimioprévention. Phagocytose. Immunité. Erythème polymorphe. Rhumatisme infectieux. Ergostérol irradié [Experimental medicine work. 1897–1931. Neurotropic ectodermoses. Neuroprotozooses. Syphilis. Chemotherapy and chemoprevention. Phagocytosis. Immunity. Erythema multiforme. Infectious rheumatism. Irradiated ergosterol] (in French). Paris: Impr. A. Maretheux et L. Pactat. OCLC 459640006.
- Levaditi, Constantin (1952). Titres et travaux: Microbiologie, pathologie humaine & animale, chimiothérapie: 1897–1951 [Titles and works: Microbiology, human & animal pathology, chemotherapy: 1897–1951] (in French). Paris: Librairie Maloine. OCLC 1237121109.
