= Rafael Armenteros =

Spanish physicist

Rafael Armenteros (1922 – 5 March 2004) was a Spanish particle physicist, who was one of the leading figures in CERN's various bubble chamber experiments. Armenteros got his physics degree from Imperial College London in 1946, and began his scientific career at the University of Manchester. After working on cosmic rays with Blackett and Butler, and later with Leprince-Ringuet at École Polytechnique, he subsequently worked at CERN with Charles Peyrou.

Armenteros is best known for the method he co-devised with Jiří Podolský in 1953–1954. This technique is used in the analysis of the dynamics of two-body V decays and the relevant representation of data is known as an Armenteros-Podolansky plot. These plots were among the first few public results from the LHC experiments, since K^{0}_{S} and (anti-)lambda particles studied this way provide good examples for the demonstration of the performance of the tracking systems.
