= The Forge and the Crucible =

1956 book by Mircea Eliade

- Cover of the first edition
- Author: Mircea Eliade
- Original title: Forgerons et alchimistes
- Translator: Stephen Corrin
- Language: French
- Publisher: Flammarion
- Publication date: 1956
- Publication place: France
- English publication date: 1962
- Pages: 209

The Forge and the Crucible (French: Forgerons et alchimistes) is a 1956 book by the Romanian historian of religion Mircea Eliade. It traces historical rites and symbols associated with mines, smiths and other metal workers. An English translation by Stephen Corrin was published in 1962. A second edition, with an updated appendix and the subtitle "The Origins and Structure of Alchemy," was published in 1979.

== Contents ==
The book contains the following chapters:

1. Meteorites and Metallurgy
2. Mythology of the Iron Age
3. The World Sexualized
4. Terra Mater. Petra Genitrix
5. Rites and Mysteries in Metallurgy
6. Human Sacrifices to the Furnace
7. Babylonian Symbolisms and Metallurgical Rituals
8. 'Masters of Fire'
9. Divine Smiths and Civilizing Heroes
10. Smiths, Warriors, Masters of Initiation
11. Chinese Alchemy
12. Indian Alchemy
13. Alchemy and Initiation
14. Arcana Artis
15. Alchemy and Temporality

== Reception ==
Kirkus Reviews wrote in 1962: "This book, translated from the French, is well documented. Any serious student of man will be well rewarded for the effort expended, and demanded, by this solid exposition of an unusual subject." Florian G. Calian, historian of religion, summarises the book as offering "a theoretical background for understanding alchemy from the perspective of the history of religion. Alchemy is a spiritual technique and can be understood not as an important moment in the history of science but rather as a kind of religious phenomenon with its own particular rules."
