= 40th Locarno Film Festival =

Film festival in Locarno, Switzerland

- Opening film: Intervista directed by Federico Fellini
- Location: Locarno, Switzerland
- Founded: 1946
- Awards: Golden Leopard: O Bobo directed by José Alvaro Morais
- Artistic director: David Strieff
- Festival date: Opening: 6 August 1987; Closing: 16 August 1987
- Website: LFF

Locarno Film Festival
- 41st 39th

The 40th Locarno Film Festival was held from 6 to 16 August 1987 in Locarno, Switzerland. It featured films and television movies from around the globe. To celebrate the 40th Anniversary, a retrospective of 40 years of films at the Locarno Film Festival was organized. Jean-Luc Godard, opened the festival with a lecture on cinema as a guest of honor. The opening film of the festival, which drew a crowd of 8,000 people, was Federico Fellini's film Intervista, despite the contract disputes that had kept the film from screening since its Cannes premiere.

Over 60,000 people attended screenings on the Piazza Grande, the open-air theater, during the week. The Piazza Grande only had 5,000 seats, but thousands sat on the floor and even stood to watch some films, including Ettore Scola's The Family. More than 600 journalists attended the festival and 1,800 professional accreditation passes were given out. Film festival chiefs from around the world attended, including the heads of the Berlin, Mannheim, San Francisco, Sydney, Melbourne, Hong Kong, Istanbul, and Cairo film festivals. It was the most expensive Locarno festival ever, with a budget of around $1,200,000 (2 million Swiss francs).

For the first time in the West, Russian director Aleksandr Sokourov was able to screen his movie The Lonely Voice of Man, which had been banned by the Soviet Union since 1978. Another Russian filmmaker, Kira Muratova, served on the festival jury and was able to screen two of her films that had also been banned in the Soviet Union. Director Win Wenders attended the festival for one day and held a midnight press conference to discuss his new film Wings of Desire. On the last day of the festival Colombia held a surprise screening of La Bamba.

The Golden Leopard, the festival's top prize, was awarded to O Bobo directed by José Alvaro Morais.

== Jury ==
=== International Jury – Main Competition ===
- Benoit Jacquot, French director
- Kira Muratova, Russian director
- Mario Botta, Swiss architect
- Richard Peña, American film researcher

== Official sections ==
The following films were screened in these sections:

=== Main Competition ===
The following films were screened in the Main Competition:

==== Feature films ====
Highlighted title indicates Golden Leopard winner:

In Competition – Feature Films / Main Program
Original Title	English Title	Director(s)	Year	Production Country
A Dos Aguas	The Two Waters	Carlos Olguin	1986	Argentina
A Fior Di Pelle	Skin Deep	Gianluca Fumagalli	1987	Italy
Aurelia		Giorgio Molteni	1987	Italy
Avril Brisé	Broken April	Liria Begeja	1987	France
Checkpoint		Parviz Sayyad	1987	USA
Dixia Qing	Love Unto Waste	Stanley Kwan	1986	Hong Kong
Hol Volt, Hol Nem Volt	A Hungarian Fairy Tale	Gyula Gazdag	1986	Hungary
Konbu Finze (Kongbu Fenzi)	Terrorizers	Edward Yang	1986	Taiwan
O Bobo		José Álvaro Morais	1987	Portugal
Odinokij Golos Celoveka	The Lonely Voice of Man	Aleksandr Sokourov	1987	Russia
Personaggi & Interpreti		Heinz Bütler	1987	Switzerland
Poisons		Pierre Maillard	1987	Switzerland, France
Robinson No Niwa	Robinson's Garden	Masashi Yamamoto	1987	Japan
Sinfin	Class	Cristian Pauls	1986	Argentina
Skytturnar	White Whales	Fridrik Thor Fridriksson	1987	Iceland
Three Bewildered People In The Night		Gregg Araki	1987	USA
With Love To The Person Next To Me		Brian McKenzie	1987	Australia
Zjoek	Zjoek: The Art of Forgetting	Erik van Zuylen	1987	Netherlands

==== Television Movies ====
Highlighted title indicates Golden Leopard's Eye winner:

In Competition – TV-Movies / Main Program
Original Title	English Title	Director(s)	Year	Production Country
After Pilkington		Christopher Morahan	1987	Great Britain
Blue Window		Norman René	1987	USA
Coast To Coast		Sandy Johnson	1987	Great Britain
El Caso Del Cadaver Descuartizado	The Case of Dismembered Corpse	Ricardo Franco	1985	Spain
Escape From Sobibor		Jack Gold	1987	Great Britain
Le Rapport Du Gendarme	The Gendarme Report	Claude Goretta	1986	Switzerland
Life Story		Mick Jackson	1987	Great Britain
Long Gone		Martin Davidson	1987	USA
May We Borrow Your Husband		Bob Mahoney	1986	Great Britain
Piatnò	The Stain	Aleko Tzabadze	1986	Russia
Promise		Glenn Jordan	1986	USA
The Last Innocent Man		Roger Spottiswoode	1987	USA
Welcome In Vienna		Alex Corti	1985	Austria
Zischke		Martin Theo Krieger	1986	Germany

=== Anniversary - 40 Years of Festivals at Locarno ===
The following films were screened in the 40th Anniversary - 40 Years of Festivals at Locarno section:

Anniversary Retrospective – 40 Years of Festivals at Locarno / Main Program
Fest	English title	Original title	Director(s)	Year	Production country
1st	My Sun	O Sole Mio	Giacomo Gentiluomo	1946	Italy
2nd	Lady In The Lake		Robert Montgomery	1947	USA
3rd	Germany, Year Zero	Germania, Anno Zero	Roberto Rossellini	1947	Italy, Germany
4th	Port of Call	Hamnstad	Ingmar Bergman	1948	Sweden
5th	Sunday in August	Domenica D'Agosto	Luciano Emmer	1950	Italy
6th	Gold Marie	Casque D'Or	Jacques Becker	1952	France
10th	Twelve Angry Men		Sidney Lumet	1955	USA
10th	Il Grido		Michelangelo Antonioni	1957	Italy
11th	Le Beau Serge		Claude Chabrol	1958	France
12th	Killer's Kiss		Stanley Kubrick	1955	USA
12th	Pozegnania		Wojciech Has	1958	Poland
14th	The Human Pyramid	La Pyramide Humaine	Jean Rouch	1960	France
14th	Saturday Night and Sunday Morning		Karel Reisz	1960	Great Britain
14th	The Connection		Shirley Clarke	1961	USA
15th	On the Empty Balcony	En El Balcon Vacio	Jomí García Ascot	1962	Mexico
16th	Hallelujah the Hills		Adolfas Mekas	1963	USA
17th	Love Meetings	Comizi D'Amore	Pier Paolo Pasolini	1963	Italy
17th	The Green Years	Os Verdes Anos	Paulo Rocha	1963	Portugal
17th	Black Peter	Cerny Petr	Milos Forman	1964	Czech Republic
18th	Age of Illusions	Álmodozások kora	Istvan Szabo	1964	Hungary
18th	Fists in the Pocket	I Pugni In Tasca	Marco Bellocchio	1965	Italy
18th	The Girl	Eltavozott Nap	Marta Meszaros	1968	Hungary
19th	Shadows of Forgotten Ancestors	Teni Sabytych Prjedkov	Serguei Paradjanov	1965	Russia
20th	The Moon with Teeth	La Lune Avec Les Dents	Michel Soutter	1967	Switzerland
21st	The Hour of the Furnances	La Hora De Los Hornos	Fernando E. Solanas	1968	Argentina
22nd	No Path Through Fire	V Ognje Broda Njet	Gleb Panfilov	1968	Russia
22nd	Three Sad Tigers	Tres Tristes Tigres	Raul Ruiz	1968	Chile
23rd	The Night of Counting the Years	El Mumiaa	Shadi Abdel Salam	1969	Egypt
25th	Bleak Moments		Mike Leigh	1971	Great Britain
26th	The Illumination	Iluminacja	Krzysztof Zanussi	1973	Poland
27th	Céline and Julie Go Boating	Celine Et Julie Vont En Bateau	Jacques Rivette	1974	France
28th	Xala		Ousmane Sembène	1974	Senegal
29th	Harvest: 3,000 Years	Mirt Sost Shi Amit	Haile Gerima	1975	Ethiopia
29th	The Big Night	Le Grand Soir	Francis Reusser	1976	Switzerland
31st	The Idlers of the Fertile Valley	I Tembelides Tis Eforis Kiladas	Nikos Panayotopoulos	1978	Greece
32nd	The Herd	Suru	Zeki Ökten	1978	Türkiye
32nd	Immacolata and Concetta: The Other Jealousy	Immacolata E Concetta	Salvatore Piscitelli	1979	Italy
34th	Pixote		Hector Babenco	1980	Brazil
36th	The Princess	Adj Kiraly Katonat!	Pal Erdöss	1983	Hungary
37th	The Terence Davies Trilogy		Terence Davis	1976	Great Britain

=== Out of Competition (Fuori Concorso) ===
The following films were screened Out of Competition (Fuori Concorso):

Out of Competition – Feature Films / Main Program
English Title	Original Title	Director(s)	Year	Production Country
Candy Mountain		Robert Frank, Rudy Wurlitzer	1987	Switzerland, France
Wings of Desire	Der Himmel Über Berlin	Wim Wenders	1987	Germany
The Death of Empedocles	Der Tod Des Empedokles	Danièle Huillet, Jean-Marie Straub	1986	Germany
Intervista		Federico Fellini	1987	Italy
I've Heard The Mermaids Singing		Patricia Rozema	1987	Canada
Another Love	Ina Laska	Dušan Trančík	1985	Czech Republic
King Lear		Jean-Luc Godard	1987	France
The Family	La Famiglia	Ettore Scola	1986	Italy, France
The Beggars	Les Mendiants	Benoît Jacquot	1987	Switzerland, France
Mills of Hell	Malom A Pokolban	Gyula Maár	1986	Hungary
The Beekeeper	O Melissokomos	Theo Angelopoulos	1986	Greece, France
Dark Eyes	Oci Ciornie	Nikita Mikhalkov	1987	Italy
Prick Up Your Ears		Stephen Frears	1987	Great Britain
Blind Chance	Przypadek	Krzysztof Kieślowski	1987	Poland
Axiliad	Siekierezada	Witold Leszczyński	1986	Poland
Under the Sun of Satan	Sous Le Soleil De Satan	Maurice Pialat	1987	France
The Theme	Tema	Gleb Panfilov	1979	Russia
A Flame in My Heart	Une Flamme Dans Mon Coeur	Alain Tanner	1987	Switzerland, France
Vera		Sérgio Toledo	1986	Brazil
Wish You Were Here		David Leland	1987	Great Britain
I Remember you	Ya Tebia Pomnu	Ali Khamraev	1986	Russia
In the Wild Mountains	Ye Shan	Xueshu Yan	1985	China
Yeelen		Souleymane Cissé	1987	Mali

=== Tribute To – Kira Muratova ===
The following films were screened in tribute to Kira Muratova:

Tribute To Kira Muratova
English Title	Original Title	Director(s)	Year	Production Country
The Long Farewell	Dolgie Provody	Kira Muratova	1971	Russia
Brief Encounters	Korotkie Vstreci	Kira Muratova	1967	Russia

=== On the Occasion of the 40th Anniversary ===
A l'occasion du 40ème anniversaire, was a special selection of films shot on-location at the Locarno Film Festival. The following films were screened in honor of the 40th Anniversary of the Festival.

40th Anniversary Screenings
Original Title	English Title	Director(s)	Year	Production Country
Cine-Piazza		François Kohler		Belgium, Switzerland
L'Internazionale Involontaria Del Cinema Giovane (Locarno 1946-1987)	The Involuntary International Cinema (Locarno 1946-1987)	Matteo Bellinelli	1987	Switzerland
Remake		Ansano Giannarelli	1987	Italy

=== Out of Program ===
The following films were screened Out of Program:

English Title	Original Title	Director(s)	Year	Production Country
Berlin, August 1945	Berlin, Août 1945	Jean Rouch	1987	
La Bomba		Luis Valdez	1987	USA

== Independent sections ==
=== Swiss Information (Information Suisse) ===
The following films were screened in the Swiss Information (Information Suisse) section:

Original Title	English Title	Director(s)	Year	Production Country
Alpenglühn		Silvia Horisberger, Norbert Wiedmer	1971	Switzerland
Blues, Black And White		Markus Imboden	1987	Switzerland
Dani, Michi, Renato Und Max	Dani, Michi, Renato and Max	Richard Dindo	1987	Switzerland
Der Lauf Der Dinge	The Course of Things	Peter Fischli, David Weiss	1987	Switzerland
Die Lange Nacht	The Long Night	Christof Vorster	1987	Switzerland
Du Mich Auch	You Me Too	Anja Franke, Dani Levy	1986	Switzerland, Germany
Duenki-Schott		Tobias Wyss	1986	Switzerland
Ex Voto	Ex Vote	Erich Langjahr	1986	Switzerland
Habibi - Ein Liebesbrief	Habibi - a Love Letter	Anka Schmid	1986	Switzerland
Ikaria Bp 1447		Pierre-Alain Meier	1987	Switzerland
Innocenza	Innocence	Villi Hermann	1986	Switzerland
Jenatsch		Daniel Schmid	1987	Switzerland
Karma		Hô Qunag Minh	1986	Switzerland
L'Autre Suisse	The Other Swiss	Alvaro Bizzarri		Switzerland
L'Ogre	The Ogre	Simon Edelstein	1986	Switzerland
La Dame De Pique	The Lady of Spades	Patricia Plattner	1986	Switzerland
Psychokillers		Jackie Léger	1987	Switzerland
Rotlicht	Red Light	Urs Odermatt	1987	Switzerland
Une Certaine Josette Bauer	A Certain Josette Bauer	Elisabeth Gujer, Uli Meier		Switzerland
Unterwegs	On the Way			Switzerland
Wendel		Christoph Schaub	1987	Switzerland
Zelja Heisst Wunsch, Zivot Ist Das Leben	Zelja Means Wish, Civilo is Life	Snezana Herceg, Otto Wymann	1986	Switzerland

== Official awards ==
=== International Jury ===
- Golden Leopard: O Bobo directed by José Alvaro Morais
- Silver Leopard: Terrorizers directed by Edward Yang (Yang De-Chang)
- Bronze Leopard: The Lonely Voice of Man directed by Aleksandr Sokourov
- Bronze Leopard (Best Acting): for Best Actor to Arpad Vermes in A Hungarian Fairy Tale
- Bronze Leopard (for Technical Achievement): to director and producer Gregg Araki for Three Bewildered People in the Night
- Special Mentions, Official Jury: to Roland Dubillard for acting in Poisons directed by Pierre Maillard; White Whales directed by Fridrik Thor Fridriksson; Robinson No Niwa (Robinson's Garden) directed by Masashi Yamamoto

=== International Jury TV-Movies ===
- Golden Leopard's Eye: Life Story directed by Mick Jackson (BBC)
- Silver Leopard's Eye: Piatno (The Stain) directed by Aleko Tzabadze (USSR)
- Bronze Leopard's Eye: Welcome in Vienna directed by Axel Corti
- Special Mention: Simon Gray for script of After Pilkington (UK)

=== FIPRESCI Jury ===
- FIPRESCI Prize: Three Bewildered People In The Night directed by Gregg Araki
- FIPRESCI Prize: The Long Farewell directed by Kira Muratova
