= Golden Leopard =

Highest award given to a film at the Locarno Film Festival

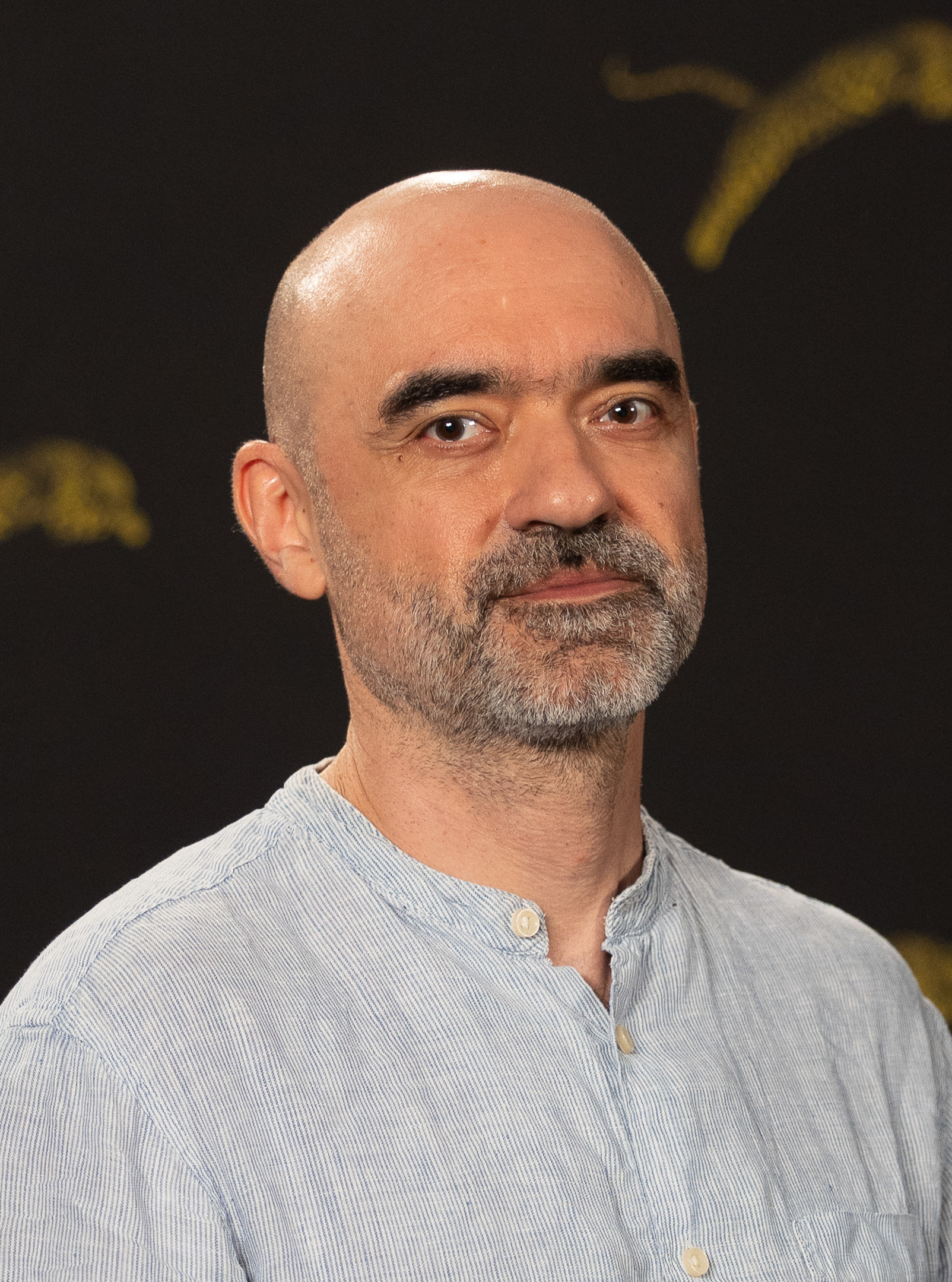
- 2026 recipient: Florin Șerban
- Country: Switzerland
- Presented by: Locarno Film Festival
- First award: 1946
- Currently held by: You Don't Belong Here (2026)

The Golden Leopard (Italian: Pardo d'oro) is the top prize at the Locarno Film Festival, an international film festival held annually in Locarno, Switzerland since 1946. Directors in the process of getting an international reputation are allowed to be entered in the competitive selection. The winning films are chosen by a jury.

Among its winners are René Clair, Roberto Rossellini, John Ford, Otto Preminger, Michelangelo Antonioni, Stanley Kubrick, Kon Ichikawa, Miloš Forman, Glauber Rocha, Raúl Ruiz, Mike Leigh, Jim Jarmusch, Terence Davies, Claire Denis, Jafar Panahi, Jean-Claude Brisseau, Albert Serra, Lav Diaz, Hong Sang-soo, Wang Bing, and Pedro Costa.

== History ==
The award went under many names until it was named the Golden Leopard in 1968. The festival was not held in 1951 and the prize was not awarded in 1956 and 1982.

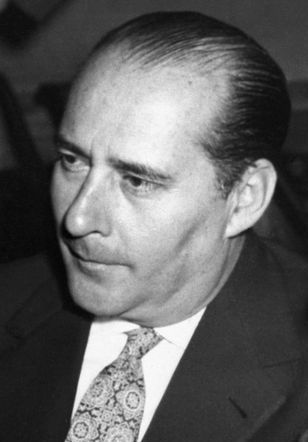
Roberto Rossellini won in 1948.

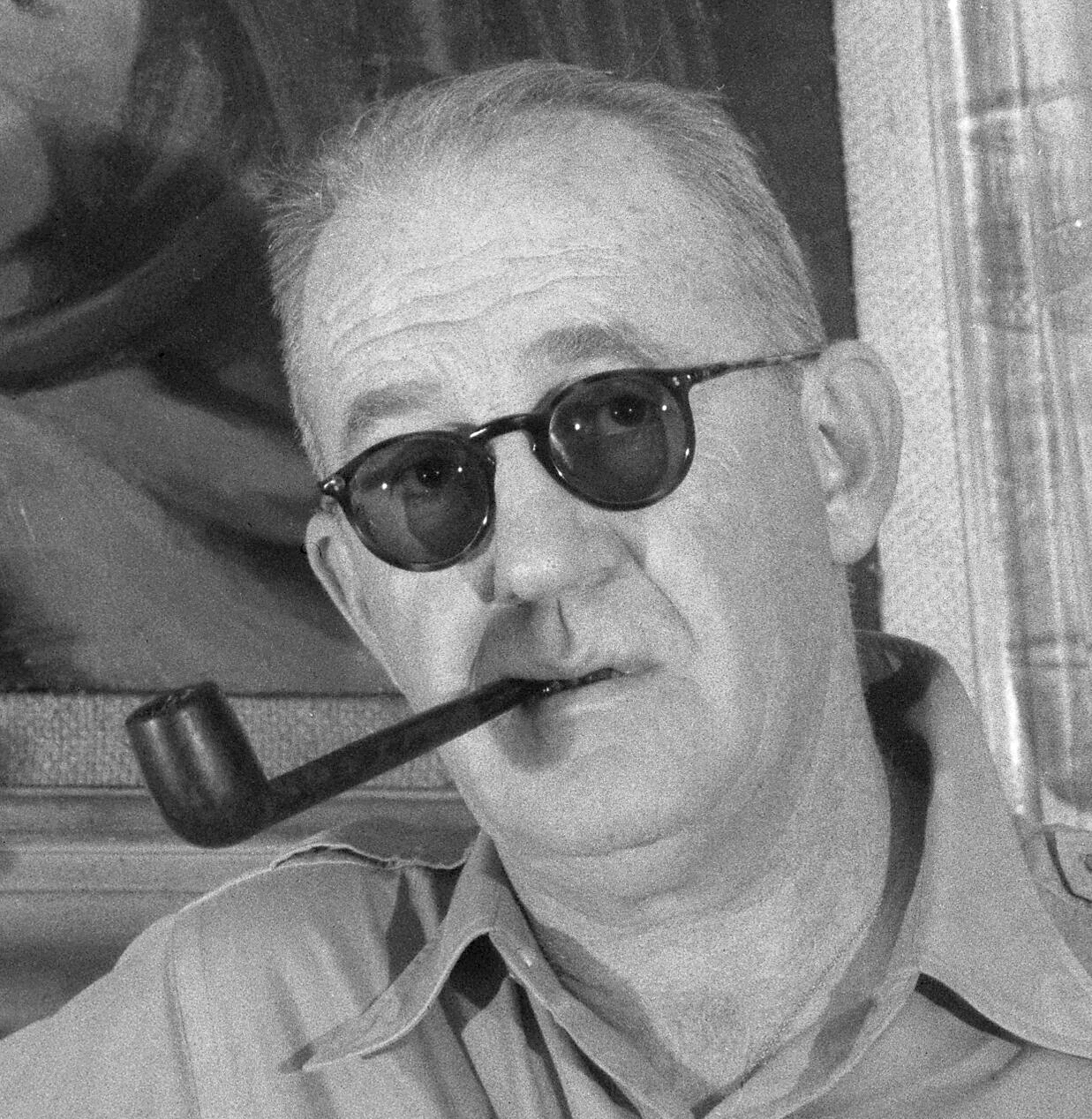
John Ford won in 1950.

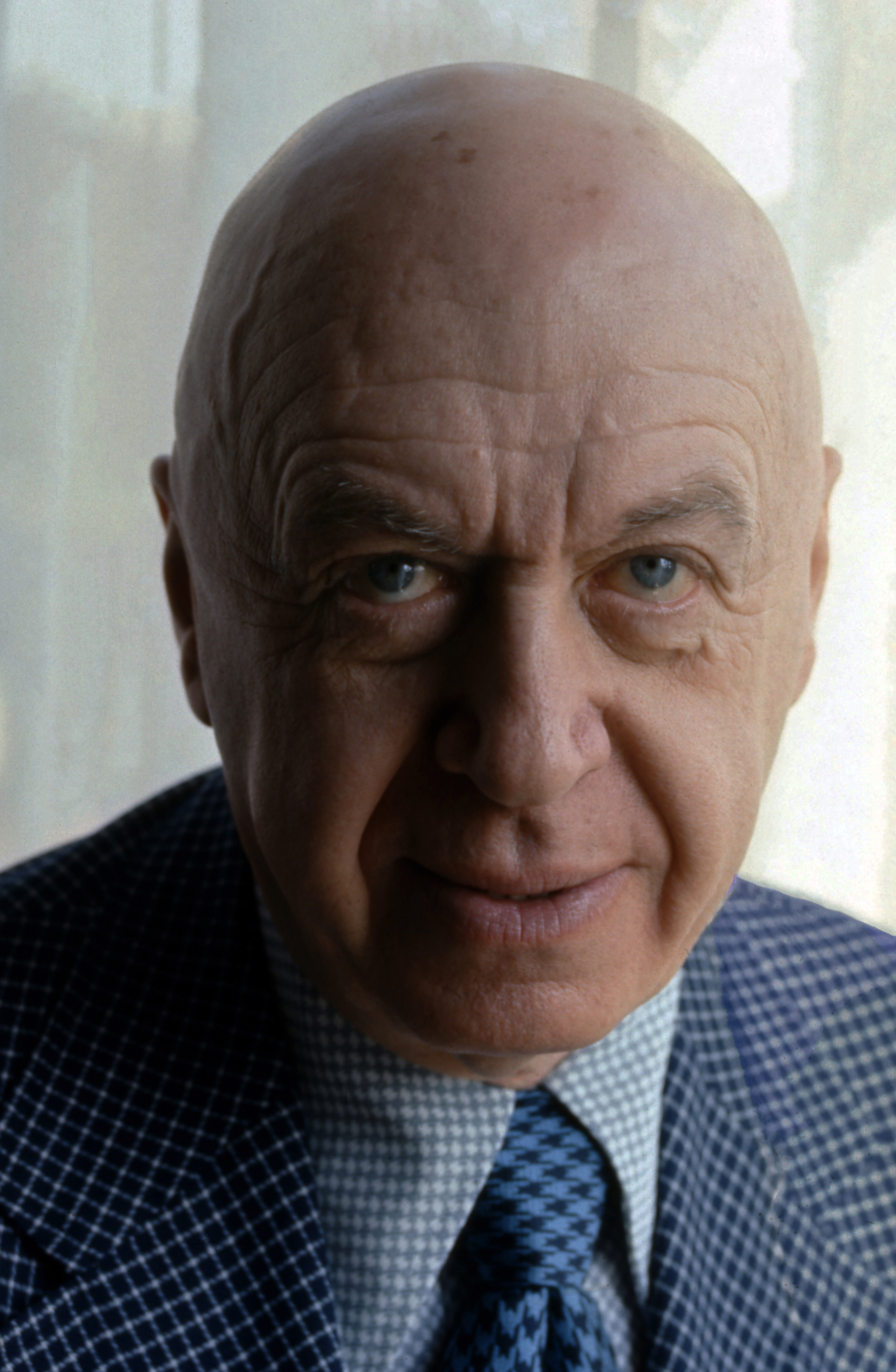
Otto Preminger won in 1955.

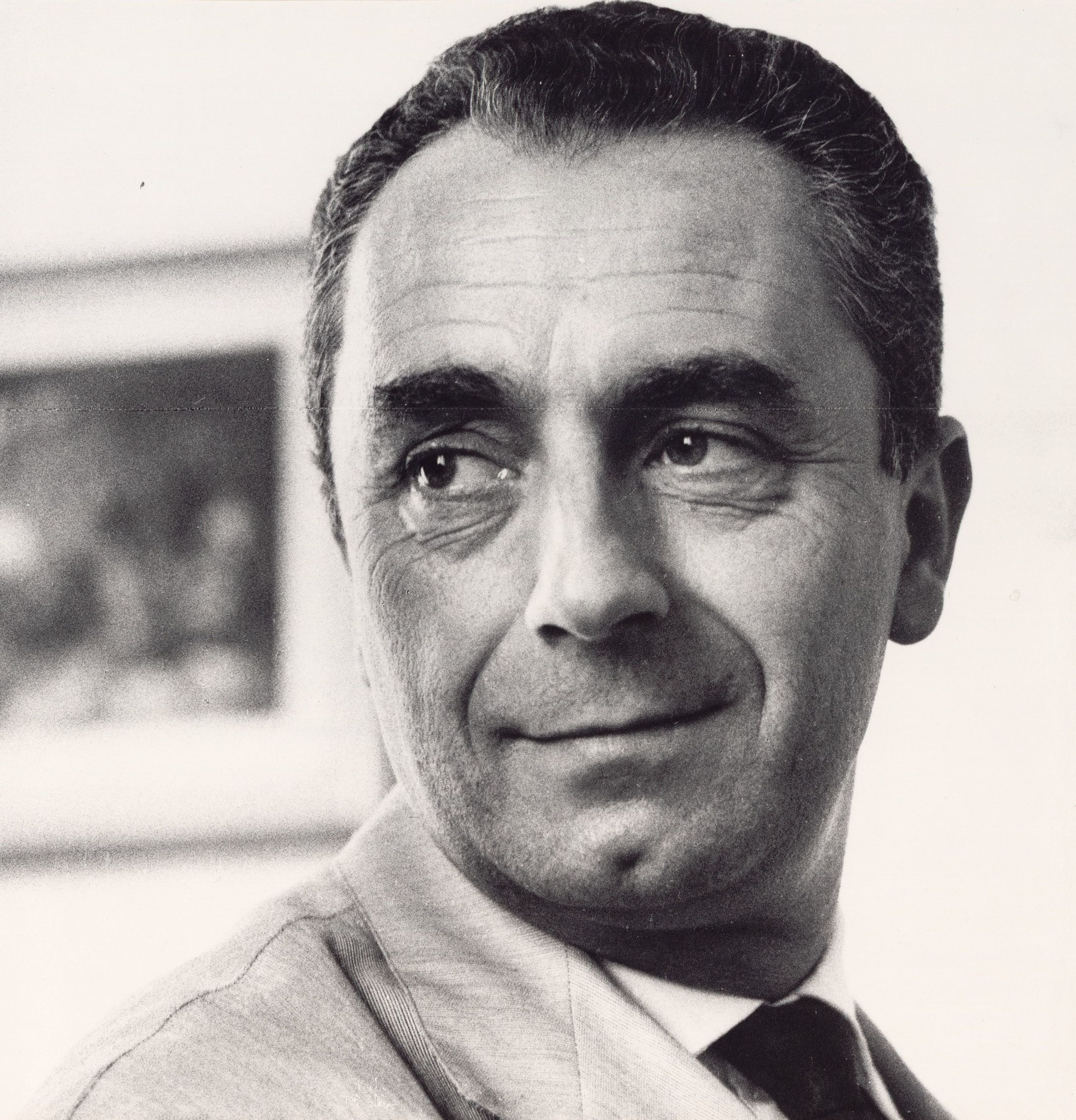
Michelangelo Antonioni won in 1957.

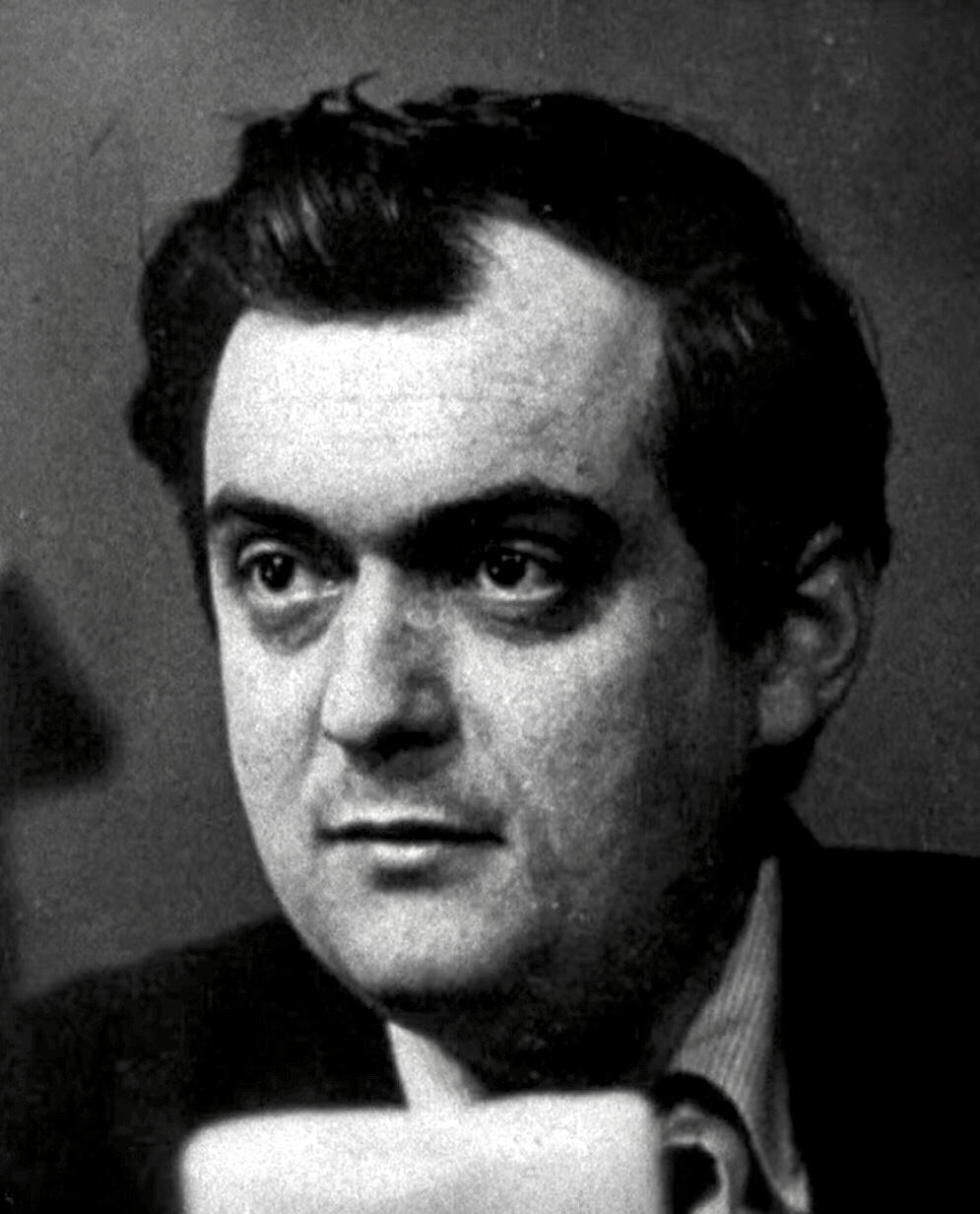
Stanley Kubrick won in 1959.

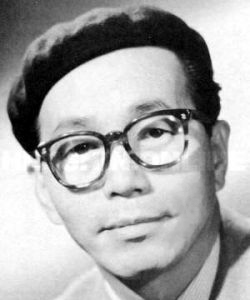
Kon Ichikawa won in 1961.

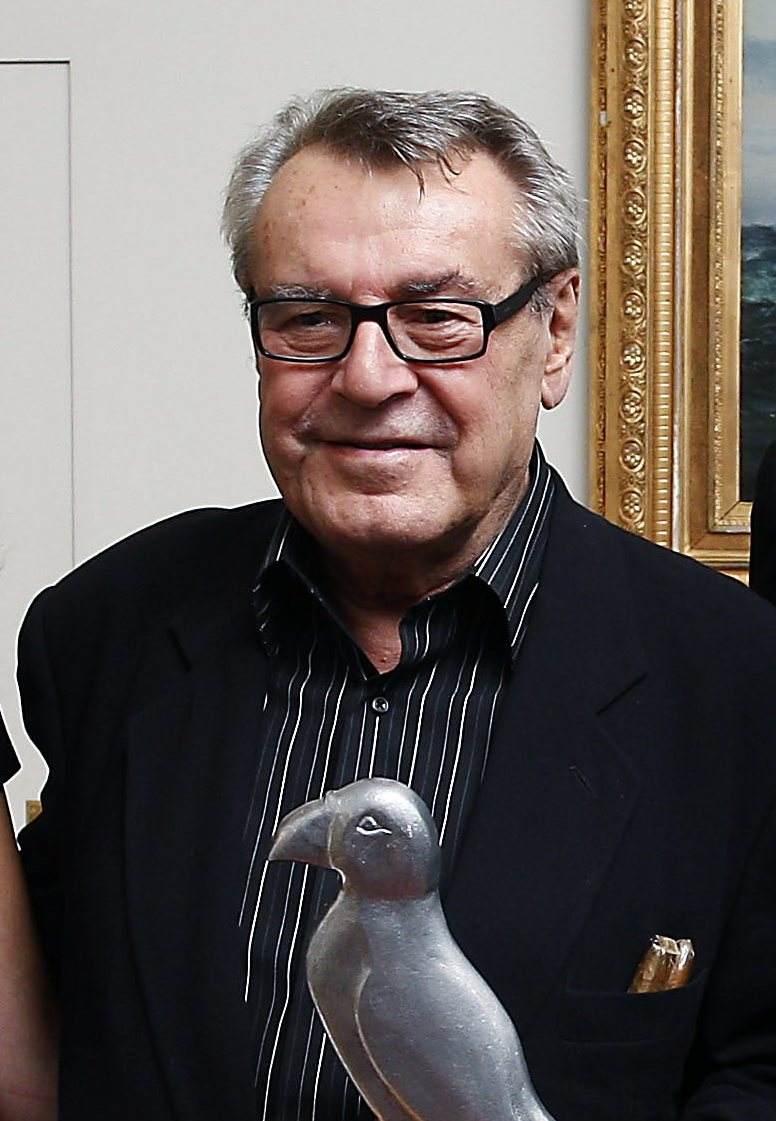
Miloš Forman won in 1964.

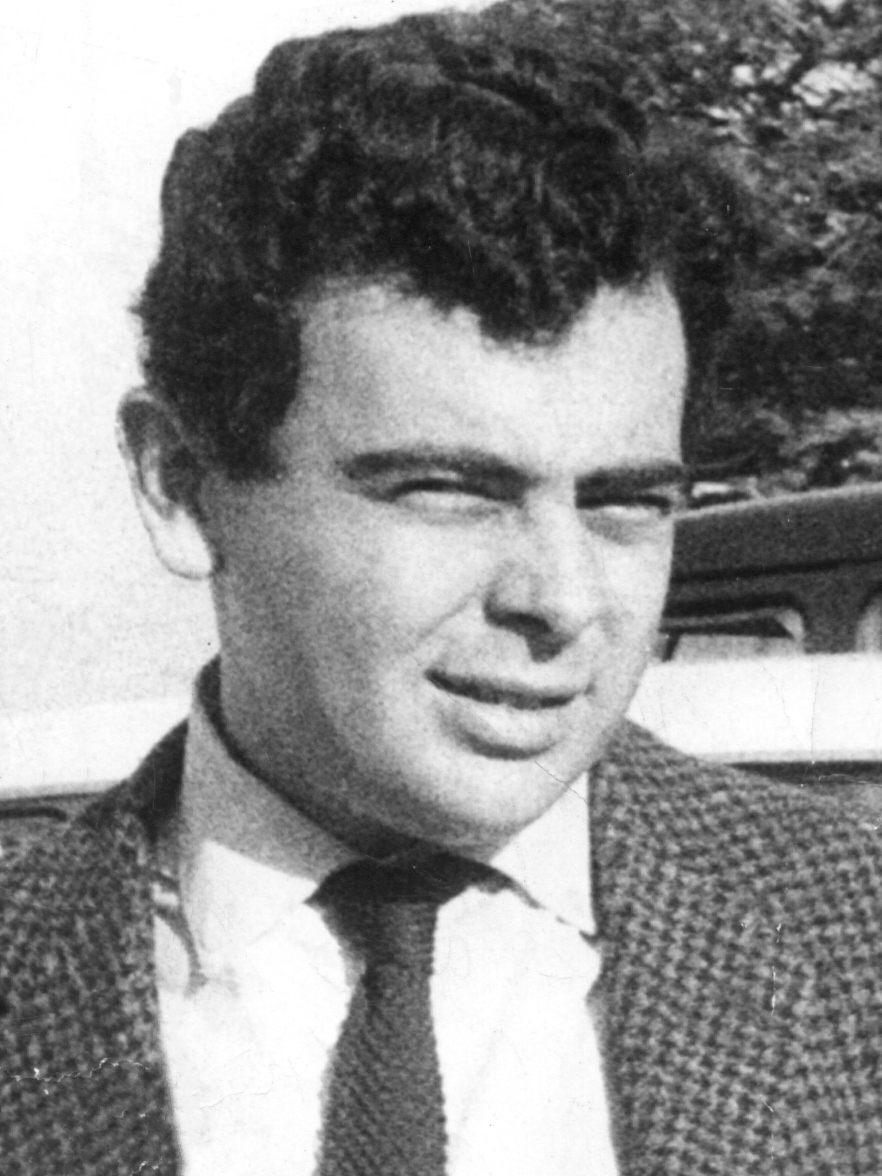
Glauber Rocha won in 1967.

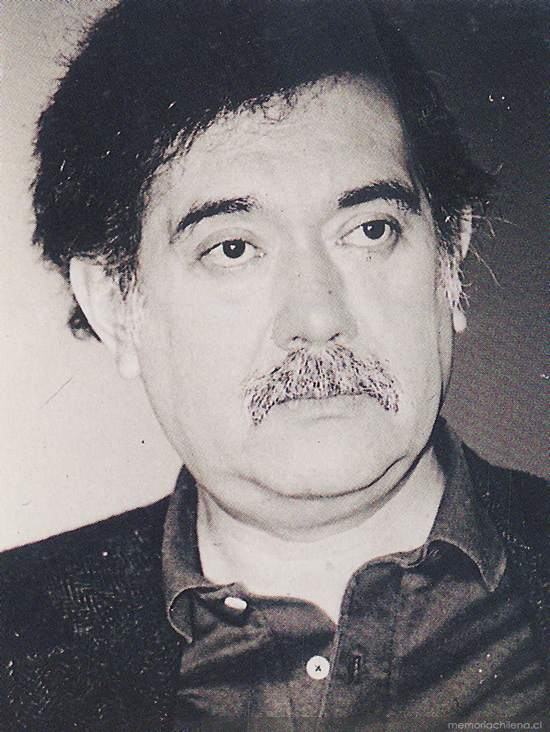
Raoul Ruiz won in 1969.

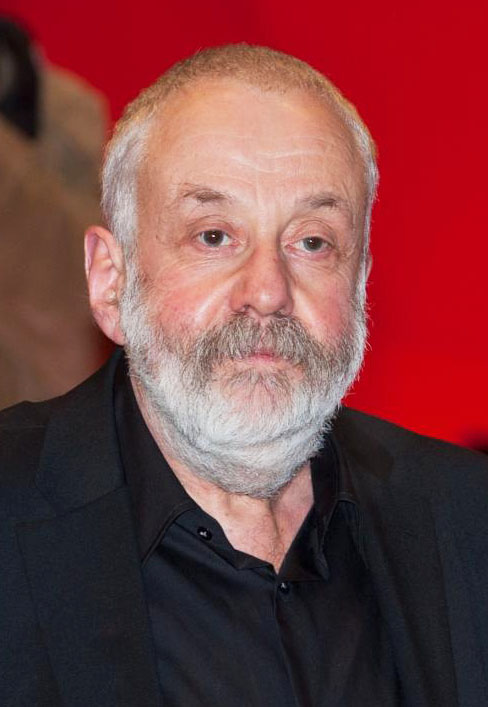
Mike Leigh won in 1972.

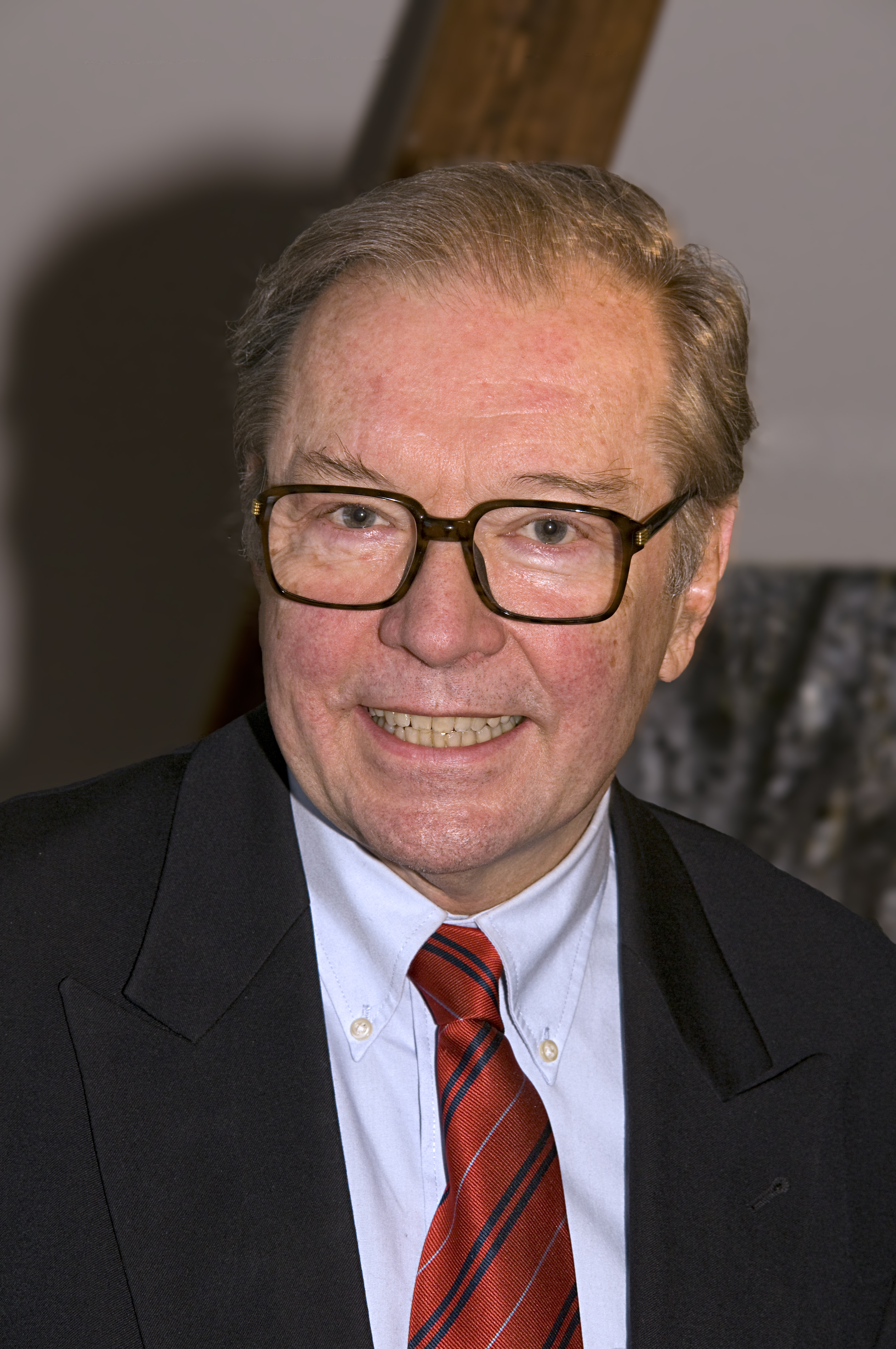
Krzysztof Zanussi won in 1973.

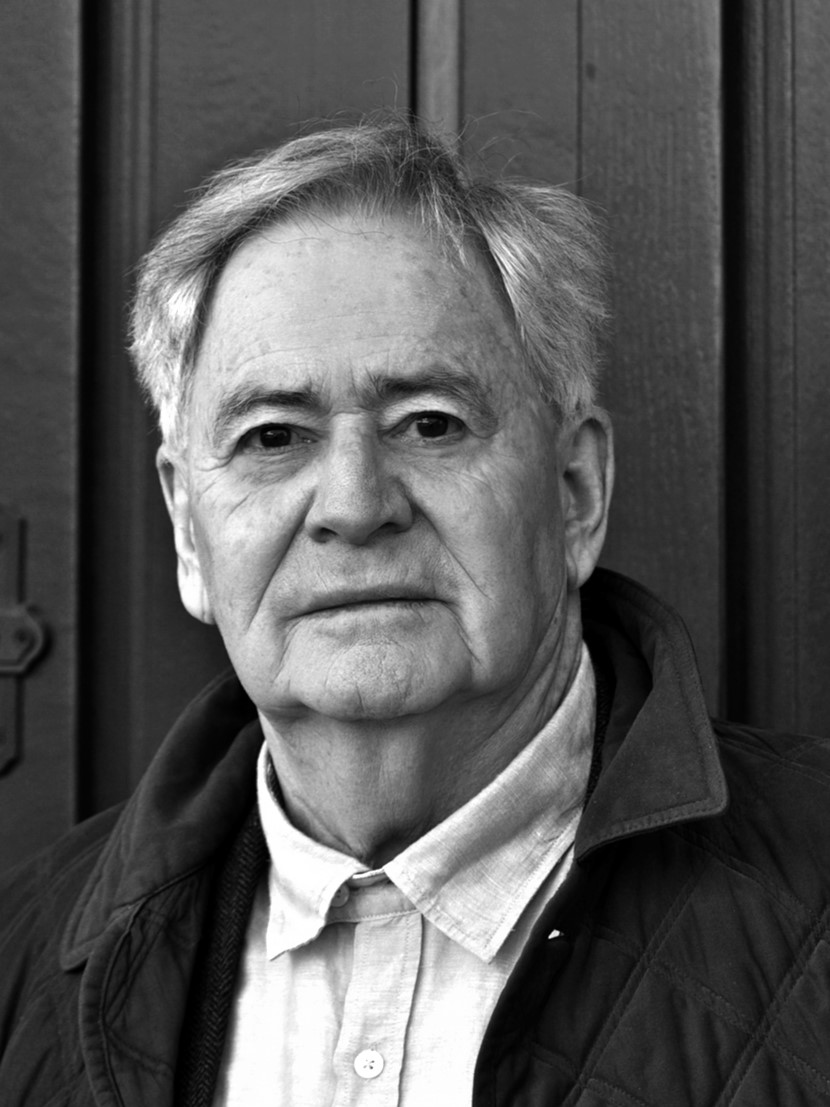
István Szabó won in 1974.

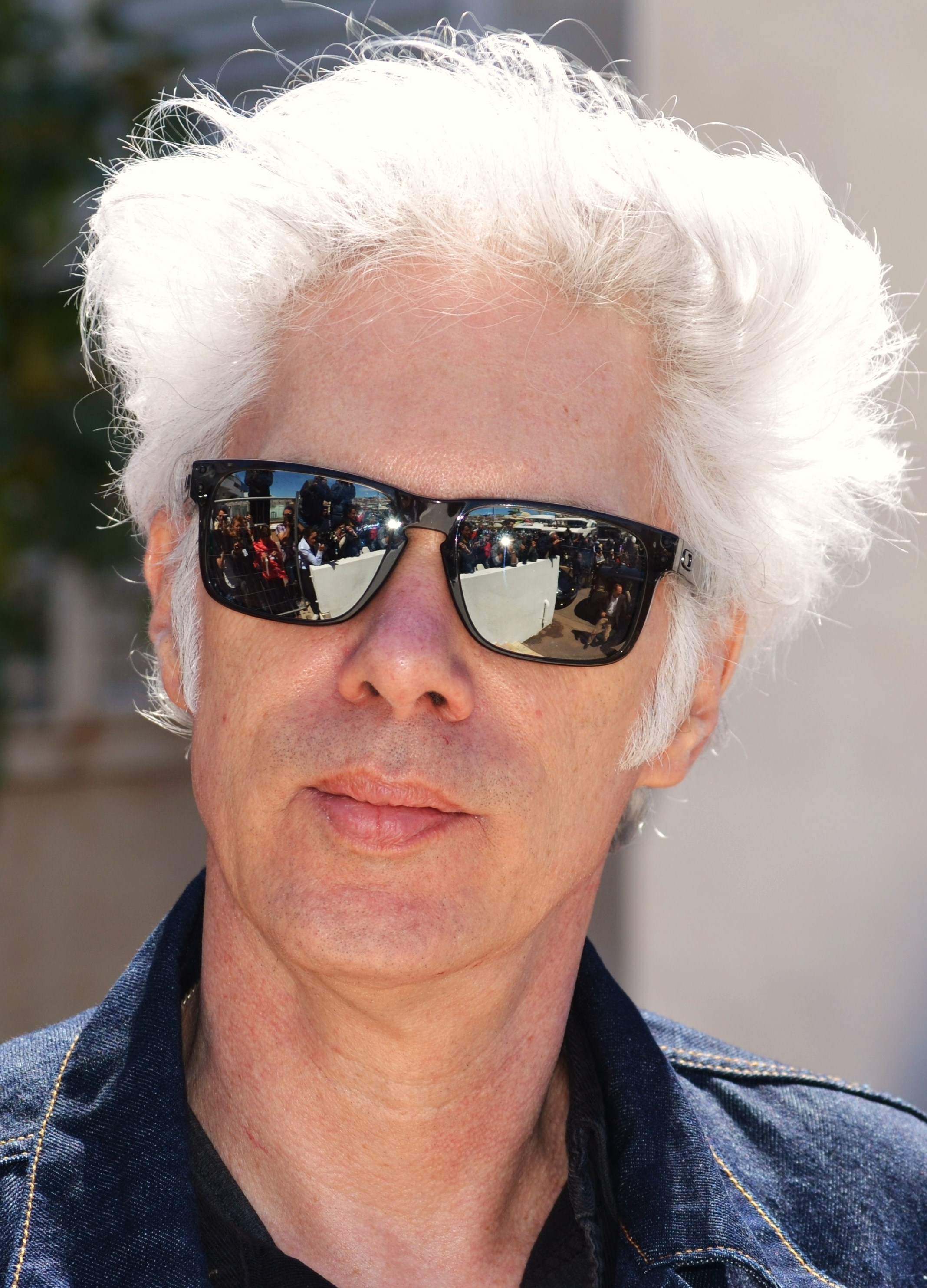
Jim Jarmusch won in 1984.

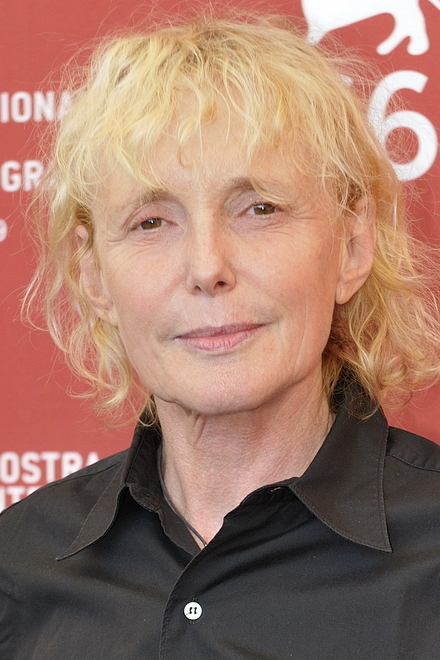
Claire Denis won in 1996.

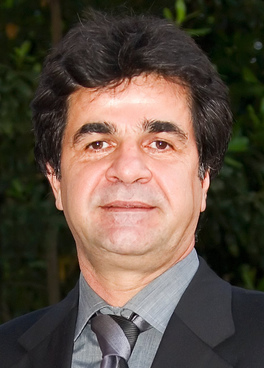
Jafar Panahi won in 1997.

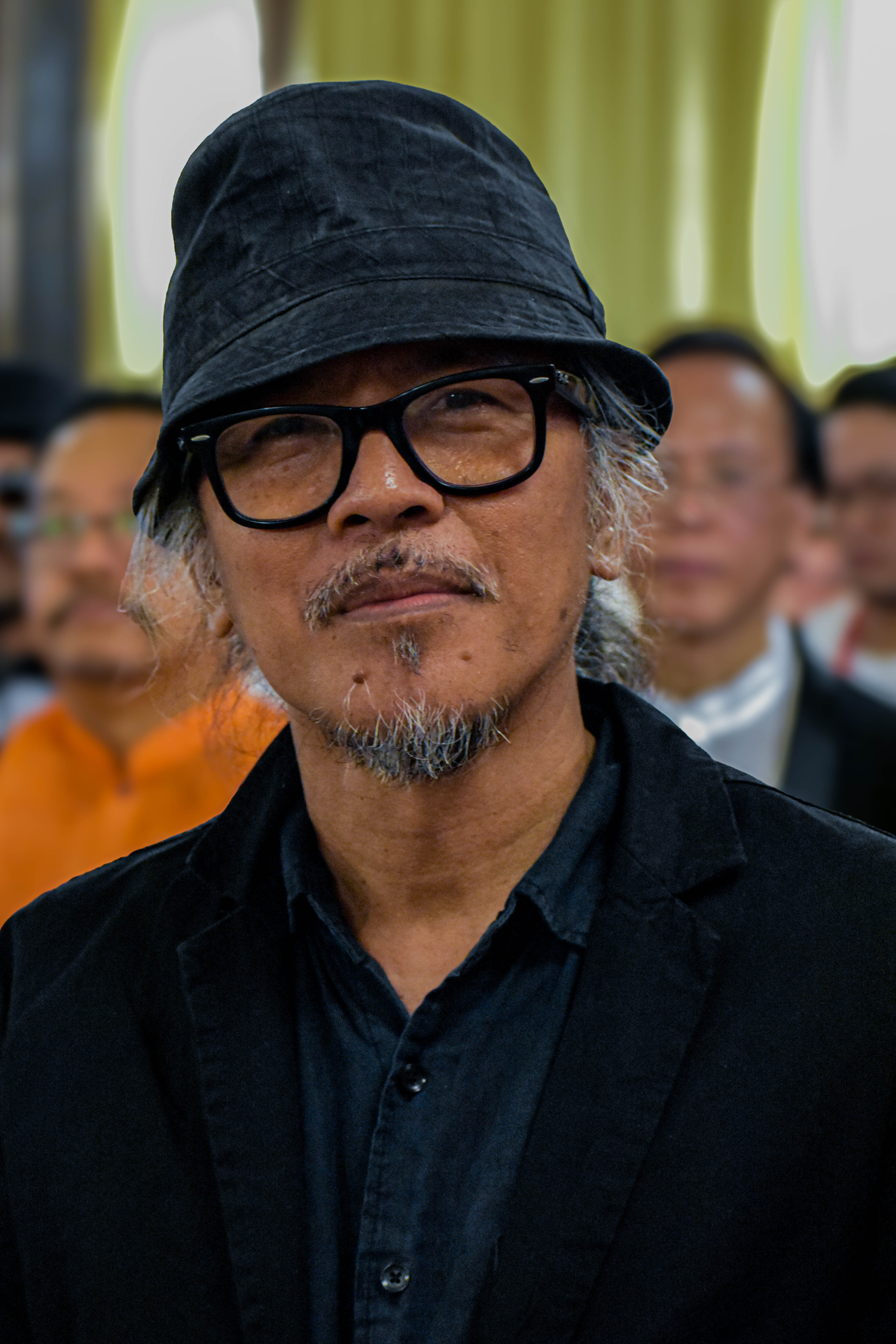
Lav Diaz won in 2014.

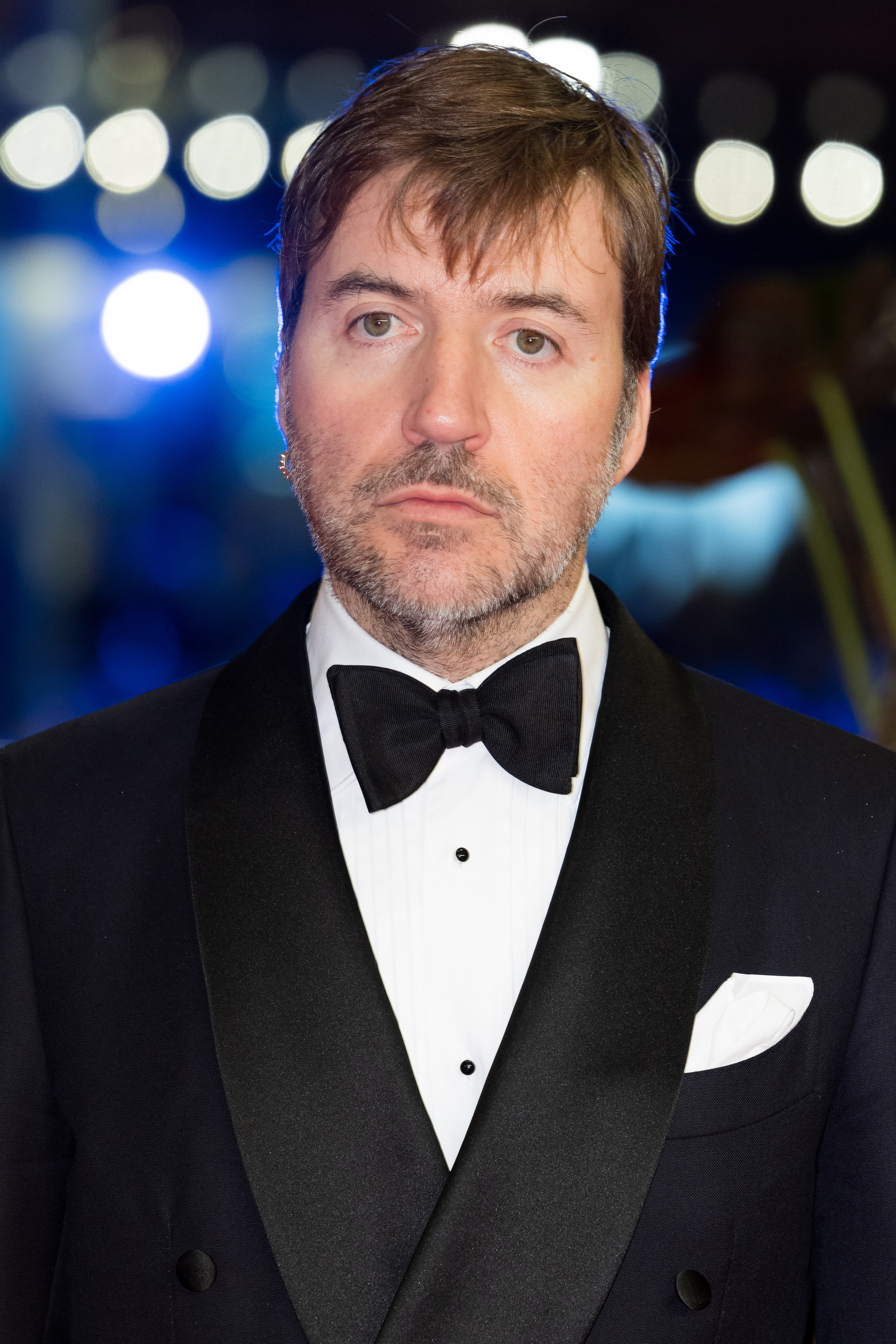
Albert Serra won in 2013.

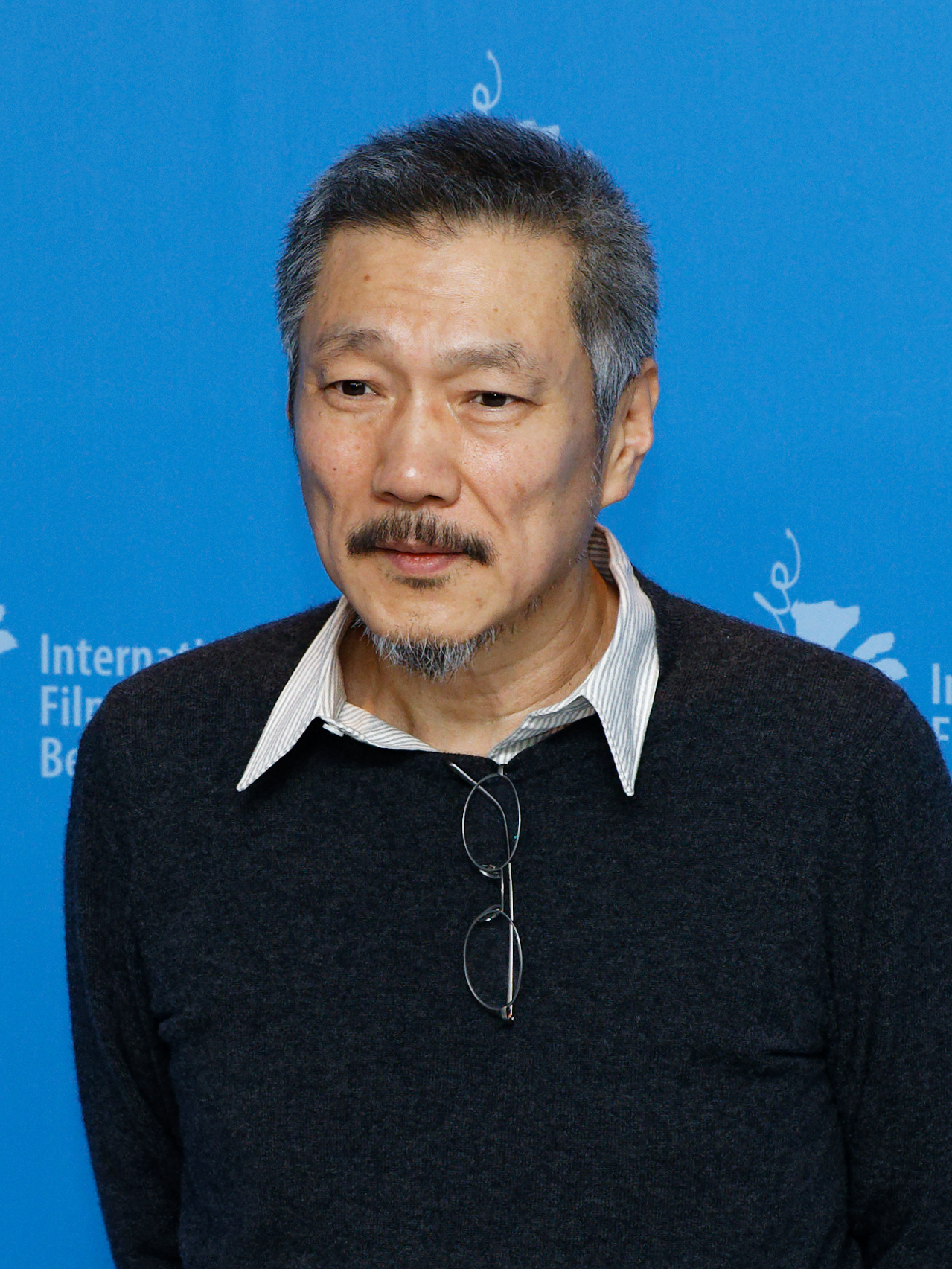
Hong Sang-soo won in 2015.

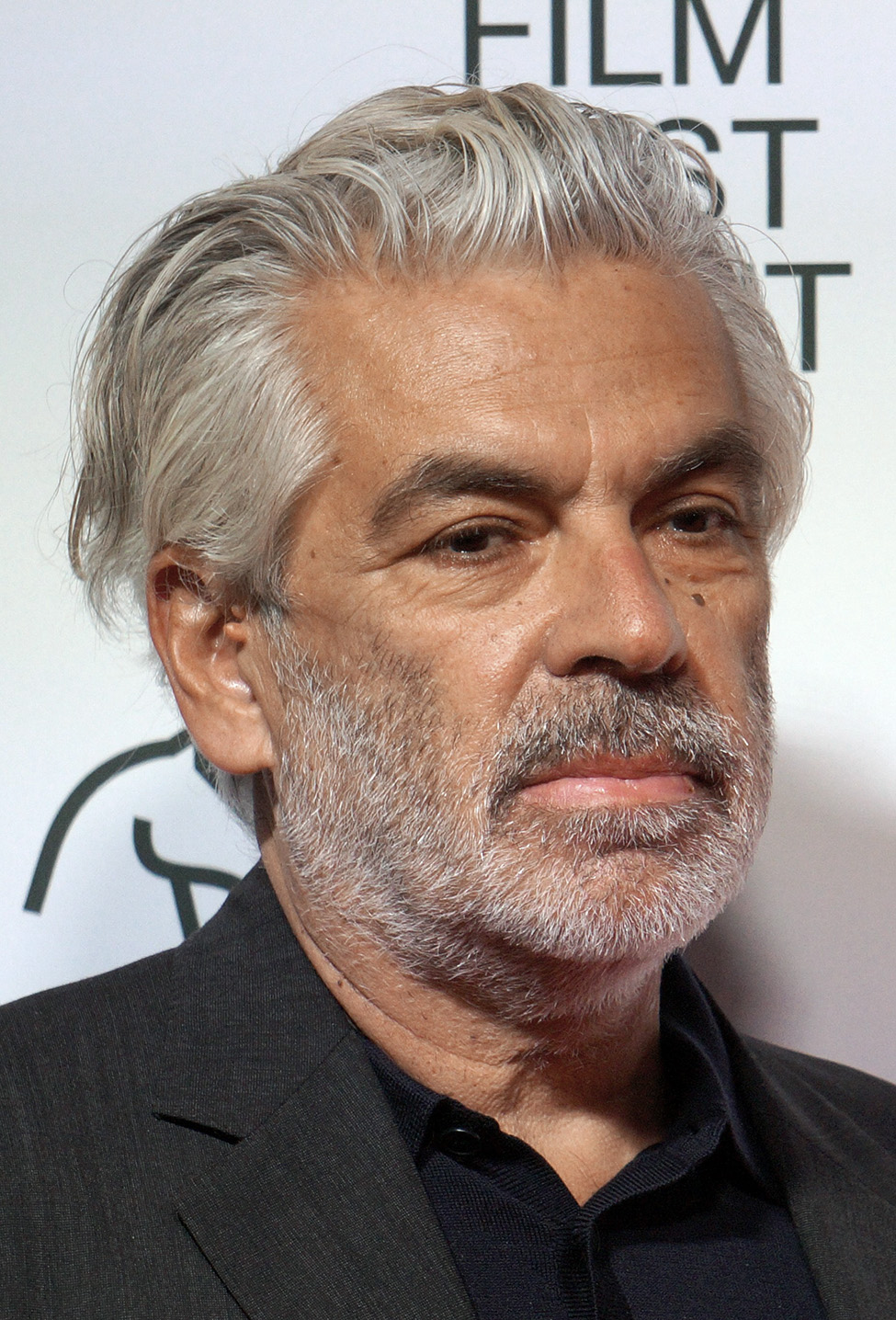
Pedro Costa won in 2019.

For the first two years the award was known as Best Film (Miglior film). Then for several years the award went by the name of Grand Prize (Gran premio). In 1950 and 1952 the award was from the International Jury of Journalists (Giuria internazionale dei giornalisti); in 1953 and 1954 the award was from the International Jury of Critics (Giuria internazionale della critica); in 1955 the award was from the Jury of Swiss-Italian Radio (Giuria della Radio della Svizzera Italiana); in 1957 the award was from the Jury of the Swiss Association of Cinematographic Press (Giuria dell'Associazione Svizzera della stampa cinematografica). In 1958 and 1960–65 the award was the Golden Sail (Vela d'oro). In 1959 it was the Prize for Best Direction (Premio per la migliore regia). In 1966 and 1967 the prize was the Grand Prize of the Jury of Youth (Gran premio della Giuria dei giovani). Finally, it became the Golden Leopard in 1968.

Soviet filmmaker Svetlana Proskurina was the first woman to win the prize at the 43rd edition, for Accidental Waltz (1990). While René Clair is the only director to have won the award twice, winning in the first two years of the festival.

== Winners ==
=== 1940s ===
Year	English Title	Original Title	Director(s)	Production Country	Ref.
1946	And Then There Were None		René Clair	United States	
1947	Man About Town	Le silence est d'or	René Clair and Robert Pirosh	France, United States	
1948	Germany Year Zero	Germania, anno zero	Roberto Rossellini	Italy, France, Germany	
1949	The Farm of Seven Sins	La ferme des sept péchés	Jean Devaivre	France	

=== 1950s ===
Year	English Title	Original Title	Director(s)	Production Country	Ref.
1950	When Willie Comes Marching Home		John Ford	United States	
1952	Hunted		Charles Crichton	United Kingdom	
1953	Julius Caesar		David Bradley	United States	
1953	The Composer Glinka	Композитор Глинка	Grigori Aleksandrov	Soviet Union	
1953	The Glass Wall		Maxwell Shane	United States	
1954	Gate of Hell	地獄門	Teinosuke Kinugasa	Japan	
1954	The Sheep Has Five Legs	Le mouton à cinq pattes	Henri Verneuil	France, United States	
1954	Rotation		Wolfgang Staudte	East Germany	
1955	Carmen Jones		Otto Preminger	United States	
1955	The Emperor's Nightingale	Císařův slavík	Jiří Trnka	Czechoslovakia	
1957	Il grido		Michelangelo Antonioni	Italy, United States	
1958	Ten North Frederick		Philip Dunne	United States	
1959	Killer's Kiss		Stanley Kubrick	United States	

=== 1960s ===
Year	English Title	Original Title	Director(s)	Production Country	Ref.
1960	Il bell'Antonio		Mauro Bolognini	Italy	
1961	Fires on the Plain	野火	Kon Ichikawa	Japan	
1962	The Winner	Un cœur gros comme ça	François Reichenbach	France	
1963	Transport from Paradise	Transport z ráje	Zbyněk Brynych	Czechoslovakia	
1964	Black Peter	Černý Petr	Miloš Forman	Czechoslovakia	
1965	Four in the Morning		Anthony Simmons	United Kingdom	
1966	Everyday Courage	Každý den odvahu	Evald Schorm	Czechoslovakia	
1967	Entranced Earth	Terra em Transe	Glauber Rocha	Brazil	
1968	The Visionaries	I visionari	Maurizio Ponzi	Italy	
1969	Charles, Dead or Alive	Charles mort ou vif	Alain Tanner	Switzerland	
1969	Those Who Wear Glasses	Szemüvegesek	Sándor Simó	Hungary	
1969	Three Sad Tigers	Tres tristes tigres	Raoul Ruiz	Chile	
1969	No Path Through Fire	В огне брода нет	Gleb Panfilov	Soviet Union	

=== 1970s ===
Year	English Title	Original Title	Director(s)	Production Country	Ref.
1970	End of the Road		Aram Avakian	United States	
1970	Lilika	Лилика	Branko Pleša	Yugoslavia	
1970	This Transient Life	無常	Akio Jissoji	Japan	
1970	Soleil O		Med Hondo	Mauritania, France	
1971	They Have Changed Their Face	Hanno cambiato faccia	Corrado Farina	Italy	
1971	On the Point of Death	In punto di morte	Mario Garriba	Italy	
1971	The Friends	Les amis	Gérard Blain	France	
1971	Private Road		Barney Platts-Mills	United Kingdom	
1971	Signs on the Road	Znaki na drodze	Andrzej Jerzy Piotrowski	Poland	
1971	Mexico: The Frozen Revolution	México, la revolución congelada	Raymundo Gleyzer	Argentina	
1972	Bleak Moments		Mike Leigh	United Kingdom	
1973	The Illumination	Iluminacja	Krzysztof Zanussi	Poland	
1974	25 Fireman's Street	Tűzoltó utca 25.	István Szabó	Hungary	
1975	The Son of Amir Is Dead	Le fils d'Amr est mort	Jean-Jacques Andrien	Belgium, France, Tunisia	
1976	The Big Night	Le grand soir	Francis Reusser	Switzerland	
1977	Antonio Gramsci: The Days of Prison	Antonio Gramsci: i giorni del carcere	Lino Del Fra	Italy	
1978	The Idlers of the Fertile Valley	Οι Τεμπέληδες της εύφορης κοιλάδας	Nikos Panayotopoulos	Greece	
1979	The Herd	Sürü	Zeki Ökten and Yılmaz Güney	Turkey	

=== 1980s ===
Year	English Title	Original Title	Director(s)	Production Country	Ref.
1980	To Love the Damned	Maledetti vi amerò	Marco Tullio Giordana	Italy	
1981	The Vicious Circle	Chakra	Rabindra Dharmaraj	India	
1983	The Princess	Adj király katonát!	Pál Erdöss	Hungary	
1984	Stranger Than Paradise		Jim Jarmusch	United States, West Germany	
1985	Alpine Fire	Höhenfeuer	Fredi M. Murer	Switzerland	
1986	Lake of Constance	Jezioro Bodeńskie	Janusz Zaorski	Poland	
1987	The Jester	O Bobo	José Álvaro Morais	Portugal	
1988	Distant Voices, Still Lives		Terence Davies	United Kingdom	
1988	Schmetterlinge		Wolfgang Becker	West Germany	
1989	Why Has Bodhi-Dharma Left for the East?	달마가 동쪽으로 간 까닭은?	Bae Yong-kyun	South Korea	

=== 1990s ===
Year	English Title	Original Title	Director(s)	Production Country	Ref.
1990	Accidental Waltz	Случайный вальс	Svetlana Proskurina	Soviet Union	
1991	Johnny Suede		Tom DiCillo	France, United States, Switzerland	
1992	Autumn Moon	秋月	Clara Law	Hong Kong, Japan	
1993	The Place on a Grey Tricorne	Azghyin ushtykzyn'azaby	Yermek Shinarbayev	Kazakhstan	
1994	Khomreh	خمره	Ebrahim Forouzesh	Iran	
1995	Raï		Thomas Gilou	France	
1996	Nenette and Boni	Nénette et Boni	Claire Denis	France	
1997	The Mirror	آینه	Jafar Panahi	Iran	
1998	Mr. Zhao	趙先生	Lü Yue	China, Hong Kong	
1999	Skin of Man, Heart of Beast	Peau d’homme, cœur de bête	Hélène Angel	France	

=== 2000s ===
Year	English Title	Original Title	Director(s)	Production Country	Ref.
2000	Father	冤家父子	Wang Shuo	China	
2001	Off to the Revolution by a 2CV	Alla rivoluzione sulla due cavalli	Maurizio Sciarra	Italy	
2002	The Longing	Das Verlangen	Iain Dilthey	Germany	
2003	Khamosh Pani	خاموش پانی	Sabiha Sumar	Pakistan, France, Germany	
2004	Private		Saverio Costanzo	Italy	
2005	Nine Lives		Rodrigo García	United States	
2006	Das Fräulein		Andrea Štaka	Switzerland, Germany	
2007	The Rebirth	愛の予感	Masahiro Kobayashi	Japan	
2008	Parque Vía		Enrique Rivero	Mexico	
2009	She, a Chinese		Xiaolu Guo	United Kingdom, France, Germany, China	

=== 2010s ===
Year	English Title	Original Title	Director(s)	Production Country	Ref.
2010	Winter Vacation	寒假	Hongqi Li	China	
2011	Back to Stay	Abrir puertas y ventanas	Milagros Mumenthaler	Argentina, Switzerland, Netherlands	
2012	The Girl from Nowhere	La fille de nulle part	Jean-Claude Brisseau	France	
2013	Story of My Death	Història de la meva mort	Albert Serra	Spain, France	
2014	From What Is Before	Mula sa Kung Ano ang Noon	Lav Diaz	Philippines	
2015	Right Now, Wrong Then	지금은 맞고 그때는 틀리다	Hong Sang-soo	South Korea	
2016	Godless	Безбог	Ralitza Petrova	Bulgaria, Denmark, France	
2017	Mrs. Fang	方绣英	Wang Bing	China, France, Germany	
2018	A Land Imagined	幻土	Yeo Siew Hua	Singapore, France, Netherlands	
2019	Vitalina Varela		Pedro Costa	Portugal	

=== 2020s ===
Year	English Title	Original Title	Director(s)	Production Country	Ref.
2021	Vengeance Is Mine, All Others Pay Cash	Seperti Dendam, Rindu Harus Dibayar Tuntas	Edwin	Indonesia, Singapore, Germany	
2022	Rule 34	Regra 34	Júlia Murat	Brazil, France	
2023	Critical Zone	منطقه بحرانی	Ali Ahmadzadeh	Iran, Germany	
2024	Toxic	Akiplėša	Saulė Bliuvaitė	Lithuania	
2025	Two Seasons, Two Strangers	旅と日々	Sho Miyake	Japan	
2026	You Don't Belong Here	Nu e locul tau aici	Florin Șerban	Romania	
