= Best Actor Award (Locarno International Film Festival) =

Award given to the best actor at the Locarno Film Festival

Leopard for Best Actor
- Awarded for: Best performance by an actor
- Country: Switzerland
- Presented by: Locarno International Film Festival
- First award: 1946
- Final award: 2022
- Currently held by: Reinaldo Amien Gutiérrez, I Have Electric Dreams, (Tengo sueños eléctricos ) by Valentina Maurel

The Leopard for Best Actor (Italian: Pardo per la miglior interpretazione maschile) is an award given at the Locarno International Film Festival. It was first awarded in 1946.

== Award winners ==
Year	Actor	Film
1946	Laird Cregar	Hangover Square
1947	Not awarded	
1948	Victor Mature	Kiss of Death
1949-1957	Not awarded	
1958	Kwan Shan	The True Story of Ah Q
1959	Ernest Borgnine	The Rabbit Trap
1960	Johnny Nash	Take a Giant Step
1961-1963	Not awarded	
1964	Gene Kelly	What a Way to Go!
1965-1976	Not awarded	
1977	József Madaras	Spider Football
1978-1988	Not awarded	
1988	Indra Bania	Halodhia Choraye Baodhan Khai (film)
1989	Adam Kamien	Kornblumenblau
1990-1992	Not awarded	
1993	André Eisermann	Kaspar Hauser
1994	Not awarded	
1995	Samy Naceri	Raï
1996	Grégoire Colin	Nénette et Boni
1997	Valerio Mastandrea	We All Fall Down
1998	Mehmet Kurtuluş; Aleksandar Jovanovic; Adam Bousdoukos	Short Sharp Shock
1999	Serge Riaboukine	Skin of Man, Heart of Beast
2000	Joachim Bißmeier; Josef Hader; Roland Düringer	Hold-Up
2001	Andoni Gracia	Off to the Revolution by a 2CV
2002	Yorgos Karayannis	Hard Goodbyes: My Father
2003	Serban Ionescu	Maria
2004	Mohammad Bakri	Private
2005	Patrick Drolet	The Novena
2006	Burghart Klaußner	The Man from the Embassy (Der Mann von der Botschaft)
2007	Michel Piccoli	Beneath the Rooftops of Paris
2007	Michele Venitucci	Out of Bounds
2008	Tayanç Ayaydin	The Market: A Tale of Trade
2009	Antōnīs Kafetzopoulos	Plato's Academy
2010	Emmanuel Bilodeau	Curling
2011	Bogdan Dumitrache	Best Intentions
2012	Walter Saabel	The Shine of Day (Der Glanz des Tages)
2013	Fernando Bacilio	El Mudo
2014	Artem Bystrov	Durak
2015	Jung Jae-young	Right Now, Wrong Then
2016	Andrzej Seweryn	The Last Family
2017	Elliott Crosset Hove	Vinterbrødre
2018	Gi Ju-bong	Hotel by the River
2019	Regis Myrupu	The Fever
2021	Mohamed Mellali, Valero Escolar	The Odd-Job Men (Sis Dies Corrents)
2022	Reinaldo Amien Gutiérrez	I Have Electric Dreams (Tengo sueños eléctricos)
