= Skin of Man, Heart of Beast =

Peau d’homme, cœur de bête
- Theatrical release poster
- Directed by: Hélène Angel
- Written by: Hélène Angel; Jean-Claude Janer; Agnès de Sacy
- Starring: Serge Riaboukine; Bernard Blancan; Pascal Cervo
- Cinematography: Isabelle Razavet
- Edited by: Laurent Rouan; Eric Renault
- Music by: Philippe Miller; Martin Wheler
- Production companies: Why Not Productions; Arte France Cinéma
- Distributed by: Mars Distribution
- Release date: 1999
- Running time: 94 minutes
- Country: France
- Language: French

Skin of Man, Heart of Beast (French: Peau d’homme, cœur de bête) is a French film directed by Hélène Angel. It won the Golden Leopard at the 1999 Locarno International Film Festival.

== Cast ==
- Serge Riaboukine as Francky
- Bernard Blancan as Coco
- Guilaine Londez as Annie
- Pascal Cervo as Alex
- Françoise Bertin as Mademoiselle Espitalier

== Accolades ==
It won the Golden Leopard and the Best Actor Award for Serge Riaboukine at the 1999 Locarno International Film Festival.
