= 10th Locarno Film Festival =

Film festival in Locarno, Switzerland

- Location: Locarno, Switzerland
- Founded: 1946
- Festival date: Opening: July 1957; Closing: July 1957
- Website: Locarno Film Festival

Locarno Film Festival
- 11th 9th

The 10th Locarno Film Festival was held in mid-July 1957 in Locarno, Switzerland. This was the festival's return after the previous year's festival had been canceled due to conflict between film producers and Swiss film distributors over market fees.

Michelangelo Antonioni's film Il grido was honored with a best picture award from the Swiss Association of Film Journalists, despite its censorship battle in Italy. 12 Angry Men directed by Sidney Lumet and The Young Stranger directed by John Frankenheimer were also well received at the festival, winning Swiss-Italian Radio critic's awards.

== Official Sections ==
The following films were screened in these sections:

=== Main Program ===
==== Feature Films ====
Main Program / Feature Films
English Title	Original Title	Director(s)	Year	Production Country
Adam and Eve	Adam Y Eva	Alberto Gout	1956	Mexico
Among Those of Montparnasse	Chez Ceux De Montparnasse	Jean-Claude Bernard	1957	France
Don Quixote	Don Quichotte	Grigori Kozintzev	1957	Russia
The Girl from Flanders	Ein Mädchen Aus Flandern	Helmuth Käutner	1956	Germany
In Liberty on the Roads of the U.R.S.S.	En Liberte Sur Les Routes De L'U.R.S.S.	Dominique Lapierre, Jean-Pierre Pedrazzini		France
Life Was the Stake	Hra O Zivot	Jiri Weiss	1956	Czech Republic
Cry	Il Grido	Michelangelo Antonioni	1957	Italy
Kean		Vittorio Gassman	1956	Italy
Song of the Forest	L'Incanto Della Foresta	Alberto Ancilotto	1957	Italy
Speaking of Murder	Le Rouge Est Mis	Gilles Grangier	1957	France
The She-Wolves	Les Louves	Luis Saslavsky	1957	France
Lissy		Konrad Wolf	1957	Germany
Fugitive in Siagon	Mort En Fraude	Marcel Camus	1957	France
Honor Among Thieves	Parola Di Ladro	Nanni Loy, Gianni Puccini	1957	Italy
The Admirable Crichton		Lewis Gilbert	1957	Great Britain
The Wayward Bus		Victor Vicas	1957	USA
The Young Stranger		John Frankenheimer	1957	USA
To Dorothy, A Son		Muriel Box	1954	Great Britain
Twelve Angry Man		Sidney Lumet	1957	USA
Warning from Space	Uchugin Tokio Ni Arawaru	Koji Shima	1956	Japan
Fantastic Vision	Vision Fantastica	Eugène Deslaw	1957	Spain, Switzerland

==== Cartoons And Documentaries ====
Main Program / Cartoons And Documentaries
Original Title	English Title	Director(s)	Year	Production Country
A Bum Steer		Mannie Davis		USA
A Ilha Que Nasce Do Mare	The Island that is Born from Mare	Fernando Garcie		Portugal
Brave Little Brave		Mannie Davis		USA
Catching Sea Creatures		Jess Kizis		USA
Contadine Del Mare	Sea Countrymen	Vittorio De Seta		Italy, USA
Divided By The Sea/Venezia, Perla Dell'Adriatico	Divided by the Sea/Venice, Pearl of the Adriatic	Giorgio Tapparelli		Italy, USA
Fritz Cremer		Hugo Hermann		Germany
Gag Buster		Connie Rasinsky		USA
Hunters Of The Sea/Cacciatori Del Mare	Hunters of the Sea/Sea Hunters	Romolo Marcellini		Italy, USA
Isole Del Verbano	Verbano Islands	Armando Lualdl		Italy
Korablik	A Little Ship	B. Sutev		Russia
La France Romane	Romanesque France	Edouard Logerau		France
Laugh With The Clowns		John Surtees		Great Britain
Le Pinceau Magique	The Magic Brush	Chin Hsi		China
Loutki Jirino Trnky	Puppets of Jiří Trnka	Bruno Sefranka		Czech Republic
Mittsommerzeit In Suomi	Mittsommerzeit in English	Hans Skalden		Germany
Mozartova Praha	Mozart's Prague	A.F. Sulk		Czech Republic
O Pintor E A Cidade	The Artist and the City	Manuel de Oliveira		Portugal
Paysages De Koueilin	Koueilin Landscapes	Yu Ki		China
Petrodvorez		A. Kajmov, K. Pogodni		Russia
Police Dogged		Connie Rasinsky		USA
Quel Ramo Del Lago	That Branch of the Lake	Gigi Polidoro		Italy
Rembrandt		Rostislav Jurenev		Russia
Rhytmik		Reni Mertens, Walter Marti		Switzerland
Rubens		Rostislav Jurenev		Russia
Rythmetic		Evelyn Lambart, Norman McLaren		Canada
Samoa				USA
Symphonie Pour Un Homme Seul	Symphony for a Single Man	Louis Cuny, Jean Image		France
The Lively Pond		Maureen Balfe, William Cormick		Canada
Toot, Whistle, Plunk And Boom		Ward Kimbal, Charles A. Nicols		USA
Venecek Pisni	Venecek Written	Hermina Tyrlova		Czech Republic

=== Special Sections ===
Feature Films Out of Program
Original Title	English Title	Director(s)	Year	Production Country
Die Windrose	Rose of the Winds	Yannick Bellon, Wu Kuoyin		Germany
Freedom For Ghana		Sean Graham		Great Britain
On The Bowery		Lionel Rogosin	1955	USA
Pather Panchali		Satyajit Ray	1955	India
The Big Show				USA
Tianxian Pei	TI'an County PEI	Shi Hui	1955	China
Film Review For Youth
Angoti	Angotee: Story of an Eskimo Boy	Douglas Wilkinson	1952	Canada
C'Est L'Aviron	It's Rowing	Norman McLaren	1944	Canada
Circus Boy		Cecil Musk	1947	Great Britain
Fiddle-De-Dee		Norman McLaren	1947	Canada
Kawakaze No Kora	This is the River Breeze	Chu Morizono		Japan
Lenora		Eduard Hofman		Czech Republic
Là-Haut Sur Ces Montagnes	Up There on These Mountains	Norman McLaren	1944	Canada
Niok, Elephant Sauvage		Edmond Séchan		France
One Little Indian		Grant Munro	1954	Canada
Pierre Et Le Portier	Pierre and the Porter	Don Peters	1955	Canada
Pohadka O Drakovi	Dragon	Hermina Tyrlova		Czech Republic
Poulette Grise	Gray Chicken	Norman McLaren	1947	Canada
Schneewittchen Und Die Sieben Zwerge	Snow White and the Seven Dwarfs	Erich Kobler	1955	Germany
Starie Znakomie	Old Friends	B. Dejkine, Mstislav Pachtchenko	1956	Russia
The Little Ballerina		Lewis Gilbert	1948	Great Britain
Ti-Jean S'En Va-T'-Aux Chantiers	Ti-Jean Goes Lumbering	Jean Palardy	1953	Canada

=== Retrospective ===
Original Title	English Title	Director(s)	Year	Production Country
Retrospective Francesca Bertini
Assunta Spina		Gustavo Serena	1915	Italy
Retrospective G.W. Pabst
Don Quichotte	Don Quixote	G.W. Pabst	1933	France
Retrospective Akira Kurosawa
Ikuru		Akira Kurosawa	1952	Japan
Tora No O O Fumu Otokotachi	The Men Who Tread on the Tiger's Tail	Akira Kurosawa	1945	Japan
Yoidore Tenshi	Drunken Angel	Akira Kurosawa	1948	Japan

== Awards ==
=== Jury of the Swiss Association of Film Journalists ===
- Prize of the Jury of the Swiss Association of Film Journalists: IL GRIDO by Michelangelo Antonioni
- Special Homage: TWELVE ANGRY MEN by Sidney Lumet

=== Jury of the Swiss-Italian Radio ===
- Prize of the Swiss-Italian Radio: THE YOUNG STRANGER by John Frankenheimer
