= Reni Mertens =

Swiss documentary filmmaker (1918–2000)

- Born: Renata Bertozzi; 8 April 1918; Zurich, Switzerland
- Died: 25 September 2000 (aged 82); Zurich, Switzerland
- Occupations: Documentary filmmaker; film producer; translator
- Spouse: Hans-Walter Mertens
- Parents: Alfredo Bertozzi (father); Louise Sommacal (mother)
- Awards: Zurich Film Prize (1970)

Reni Mertens (born Renata Bertozzi; 8 April 1918 – 25 September 2000) was a Swiss documentary filmmaker. In 1953 she founded the film production company Teleproduction with Walter Marti, with whom she made about twenty films up to 1993, among them Ursula oder das unwerte Leben (1966). She was an important figure in Swiss documentary filmmaking in the second half of the 20th century and a pioneer of New Swiss Cinema.

== Biography ==
Reni Mertens was born Renata Bertozzi on 8 April 1918 in Zurich, the daughter of Alfredo Bertozzi, a hairdresser and greengrocer, and Louise Sommacal. She married Hans-Walter Mertens, a linguist and journalist. She obtained a commercial diploma and her Matura in Zurich, studied Romance languages in Geneva and Zurich, and earned a doctorate.

During her studies, probably around 1945, Mertens founded a debating club whose members included well-known émigrés such as Georg Lukács, Ignazio Silone, Cesare Zavattini and Bertolt Brecht. She taught, made radio programs, worked for Swiss Television, subtitled films and translated works by Brecht and Max Frisch, among others, into Italian.

In 1953 Mertens founded the film production company Teleproduction (dissolved in 1999) with Walter Marti, with whom she then worked in a partnership that lasted for decades. In 1962 she was one of the founding members of the Verband Schweizerischer Filmgestalter (association of Swiss filmmakers; since 1998 Verband Filmregie und Drehbuch Schweiz). Up to 1993 Mertens and Marti made about twenty films, notable for their sociopolitical commitment and formal radicalism; a high point was Ursula oder das unwerte Leben (1966).

Mertens was an important figure in Swiss documentary filmmaking in the second half of the 20th century and a pioneer of New Swiss Cinema (Neuer Schweizer Film). She received several awards, among them the Zurich Film Prize (Zürcher Filmpreis) in 1970. She died on 25 September 2000 in Zurich.

== Bibliography ==
- I. Lambelet, Reni Mertens, Walter Marti, cinéastes, 1989
- Ciné-Bulletin, 11, 2000, 1–5

=== Archives ===
- Swiss Film Archive, Lausanne: personal papers (Nachlass)
