= Raï (1995 film) =

- Directed by: Thomas Gilou
- Screenplay by: Cyril Collard; Thomas Gilou; Sonia Kronlund; Aïssa Djabri; Messaoud Hattau; Djamila Djabri
- Produced by: Aïssa Djabri; Farid Lahouassa
- Starring: Tabatha Cash; Mustapha Benstiti
- Cinematography: Jean-Jacques Bouhon
- Production companies: M6 Films; Vertigo
- Distributed by: Pan Européenne Distribution
- Release date: 28 June 1995
- Running time: 89 minutes
- Country: France
- Language: French
- Budget: $2 million
- Box office: $768.000

Raï is a 1995 French film directed by Thomas Gilou. It won the Golden Leopard at the 1995 Locarno International Film Festival.

== Plot ==
Djamel (Mustapha Benstiti) tries to escape the spiral of drugs and delinquency which crushes all his friends in the suburban city where he lives. He works at the municipal swimming pool and wants to start a family with Sahlia (Tabatha Cash), the sister of his friend Mezz (Micky El Mazroui), who wants to break all ties with his culture of origin.

== Cast ==
- Tabatha Cash : Sahlia
- Mustapha Benstiti : Djamel
- Samy Naceri : Nordine
- Micky El Mazroui : Mezz
- Tara Römer : Laurent
- Faisal Attia : Aziz
- Léa Drucker : Girl at the party
- Édouard Baer

== Reception ==
It won the Golden Leopard at the 1995 Locarno International Film Festival.
