= 9th Locarno Film Festival =

Film festival in Locarno, Switzerland

- Location: Locarno, Switzerland
- Founded: 1946
- Festival date: Opening: 9 July 1955; Closing: 19 July 1955
- Website: Locarno Film Festival

Locarno Film Festival
- 10th 8th

The 9th Locarno Film Festival was held from 9 July to 19 July 1955 in Locarno, Switzerland. Films from 15 nations were exhibited, including some from behind the Iron Curtain.

Some notable films of the festival included Carmen Jones directed by Otto Preminger, Marty directed by Delbert Mann and Summertime (also called Summer Madness) directed by David Lean.

== Official Sections ==
The following films were screened in these sections:

=== Pre-Program ===
Original Title	English Title	Director(s)	Year	Production country
Art Et Artisanat Populaire Chinois	Chinese Art and Popular Craftsmanship			China
Ballata Siciliana	Sicilian Ballad			Italy
Beau Petit Pays	Beautiful Little Country			Switzerland
Blue Plate Symphony		Connie Rasinski	1954	USA
Captain Outrageous		Pete Burness	1952	USA
Concerto Ginnico	Gymnastic Concert			Italy
Dobrý Voják Svejk	The Good Soldier Schweik	Jiri Trnka		Czech Republic
Due Giorni In Italy	Two Days in Italy	Fausto Saraceni		Italy
The Bull	El Toro			USA
Fabulous Las Vegas				USA
First Flying Fish		Connie Rasinski	1955	USA
Ghost Town				USA
L'Empereur Des Singes				Czech Republic, China
La Carpe Tcheque				Czech Republic
La Rinascita Di Una Valle		Guido Saraceni		Switzerland
Les Eloquents		Jacques Guillon	1954	France
Magoo's Masterpiece		Pete Burness	1953	USA
Man on the Flying Trapeze		Clyde Bruckman, W.C. Fields	1935	USA
Movie Stunt Pilot		Otto Lang	1954	USA
Nos Champions De Natation				Hungary
Primavera Di Roma				Italy
Safety Spin		Pete Burness	1953	USA
Svejkova Nehody Ve Vlaku		Jiri Trnka		Czech Republic
Taormina Perla Del Mediterraneo				Italy
The Magic Touch				India
The Tell-Tale Heart				USA
When Magoo Flew		Pete Burness	1954	USA
Yokohama Yankee		Connie Rasinski	1955	USA
Z Hatvanu Do Halice		Jiri Trnka		Czech Republic

=== Principal Program ===
Programme Principal

English Title	Original Title	Director(s)	Year	Production Country
Springtime in Budapest	Budapesti Tavasz	Félix Mariassy	1955	Hungary
Carmen Jones		Otto Preminger	1954	USA
Casta Diva		Carmine Gallone	1955	Italy
The Emperor's Nightingale	Cisaruv Slavik	Jiri Trnka	1948	Czech Republic
Condemned	Condenados	Manuel Mur Oti	1953	Spain
Das Fräulein Von Scudery		G. Eugen York	1955	Germany, Sudan
The Last Ten Days	Der Letzte Akt	G.W. Pabst	1955	Austria
Female On The Beach		Joseph Pevney	1955	USA
The Country Schoolmaster	Heideschulmeister Uwe Karsten	Hans Deppe	1954	Germany
Master of Life and Death	Herr Über Leben Und Tod	Victor Vicas	1954	Germany
I Know What I'm Living For	Ich Weiss Wofür Ich Liebe	Paul Verhoeven	1955	Germany
Devotion	Ispitanie Vernosti	Ivan Pyriev	1954	Russia
Italia K2		Mario Fantin	1955	Italy
The Letter with Feathers	Ji mao Xin	Shi Hui	1954	China
The Golden Demon	Konjiki Yasha	Koji Shima	1953	Japan
Golden Vein	La Vena D'Oro	Alessandro Bolognini	1955	Italy
The Mask of Tutankhamun / the Treasure of the Pharaohs	Le Masque De Tout Ankh Amon / Le Tresor Des Pharaons	Marco de Gastyne	1955	France
The Ladies of the 04	Le Signorine Dello 04	Gianni Franciolini	1955	Italy
Men in White	Les Hommes En Blanc	Ralph Habib	1955	France
Man Without A Star		King Vidor	1955	USA
Marianne of My Youth	Marianne De Ma Jeunesse		1955	France
Marty		Delbert Mann	1955	USA
There is No Greater Love	Non C'é Amore Più Grande	Giorgio Bianchi	1955	Italy
Married Woman	Parineeta	Bimal Roy	1953	India
Phffft		Mark Robson	1954	USA
Pole Poppenspäler		Arthur Pole	1954	Germany
Pulang		Basuki Effendy		Indonesia
Razzia	Razzia Sur La Chnouf	Henri Decoin	1955	France
Rebound		Arthur Lubin		Great Britain
Native Land	Rodna Zeme	Josef Mach	1954	Czech Republic
Elementary School	Scuola Elementare	Alberto Lattuada	1954	Italy, France
Summer Madness		David Lean		Great Britain
The Colditz Story		Guy Hamilton	1955	Great Britain
The Long Gray Line		John Ford	1955	USA
The Magic Garden		Donald Swanson	1952	South Africa
The Racers		Henry Hathaway	1955	USA

=== Special Sections ===
Ethnographic Film Review
English Title	Original Title	Director(s)	Year	Production Country
Kandyan Ballet	Ballet Kandyaan	Robert Morillère	1953	France
Nomads of the Sum	Bororo (Les Nomades Du Soleil)	Henry Brandt	1954	Switzerland
Carnival in Binche	Carnaval De Binche	Jean Cleinge, Gérard De Boe	1953	Belgium
Cemeteries in the Cliff	Cimetière Dans La Falaise	Jean Rouch	1952	France
Death Day		Sergei Mikhailovich Eisenstein	1933	USA
Hamba Celebration	Fête Chez Les Hamba	Luc de Heusch	1955	Belgium
Wrack	Goemons	Yannick Bellon	1947	France
Bullfight	La Course De Taureaux	Myriam Borsoutsky, Pierre Braunberger	1951	France
Land Without Bread	Las Hurdes	Luis Buñuel	1932	Spain
The Mad Masters	Les Maîtres Fous	Jean Rouch	1955	France
Ruanda		Luc de Heusch	1955	Belgium
The Muruts Of North Borneo		Iva Polunin	1954	Great Britain
Visions of Sardinia	Visioni Della Sardegna	Centro Etnografico Sardo		Italy
Private Visions
English title	Original title	Director(s)	Year	Production country
Journey to the Beginning of Time	Cesta Do Praveku	Karel Zeman	1955	Czech Republic
Lost Continent	Continente Perduto	Leonardo Bonzi, Mario Craveri	1954	Italy
The Captain and His Hero	Der Hauptmann Und Sein Held	Max Nosseck	1955	Germany
The Right to Be Born	El Derecho De Nacer	Zacharias Gomez Urquiza	1951	Mexico
La Strada		Federico Fellini	1954	Italy
	Liang Shanbo Yu Zhu Yingtai	Sang Hu, Huaang Sha	1954	China
Ludwig II	Ludwig Ii. Glanz Und Ende Eines Königs	Helmuth Käutner	1955	Germany
Ludwig Van Beethoven		Max Jaap	1954	Germany
No More Fleeing	Nicht Mehr Fliehen	Herbert Vesely	1955	Germany
Romeo & Juliet	Romeo I Dzhulyetta	Leo Arnchtam, Leonid Lavrosky	1955	Russia
Stronger than the Night	Stärcher Als Die Nacht	Slatan Dudow	1954	Germany
Tempo D'Amarsi		Elio Ruffo	1954	Italy

== Awards ==
=== Jury of the Swiss-Italian Radio ===
- Prize of the Swiss-Italian Radio: THE EMPEROR'S NIGHTINGALE by Jiri Trnka, CARMEN JONES by Otto Preminger

=== Ticino critics Jury ===
- Best film: STÄRCHER ALS DIE NACHT by Slatan Dudow, THE EMPEROR'S NIGHTINGALE by Jiri Trnka
- Best Actor and Actress: Dorothy Dandridge in CARMEN JONES by Otto Preminger, Wilhelm Koch-Hooge in STÄRCHER ALS DIE NACHT by Slatan Dudow

=== Etnographic cinema experts reunion ===
- Excellence mention: BORORO (LES NOMADE DU SOLEIL) by Henry Bradt
