= O Bobo =

- Directed by: José Álvaro Morais
- Release date: 1987
- Country: Portugal
- Language: Portuguese

O Bobo is a 1987 Portuguese film directed by José Álvaro Morais, produced by António da Cunha Telles and based on a play written by the renowned 19th-century Portuguese writer Alexandre Herculano.

== Awards ==
1987 Locarno International Film Festival

- Won: Golden Leopard
