= 13th Locarno Film Festival =

Film festival in Locarno, Switzerland

- Location: Locarno, Switzerland
- Founded: 1946
- Awards: Golden Sail (later the Golden Leopard) winner Il bell'Antonio directed by Alessandro Bolognini
- Festival date: Opening: 21 July 1960; Closing: 31 July 1960
- Website: Locarno Film Festival

Locarno Film Festival
- 14th 12th

The 13th Locarno Film Festival was held 21 July to 31 July 1960 in Locarno, Switzerland. Josef von Sternberg served as the jury president for the main competition. The winner of the Golden Sail, which was the festival's main prize prior to the Golden Leopard, was Il bell'Antonio directed by Alessandro Bolognini. Jiri Krejcik's film Vissi Princip was the winner of the FIPRESCI Special Jury Prize.

== Official Sections ==
The following films received screenings in the sections below:

=== Principal Program ===
==== Feature films in Competition ====
Highlighted title indicates winner

Title	Director(s)	Year	Production Country
The Joker	Philippe de Broca	1960	France
Le Signe du Lion	Éric Rohmer	1959	France
Macario	Roberto Gavaldón	1960	Mexico
My Schoolfriend	Robert Siodmak	1960	Germany
Death of a Friend	Franco Rossi	1959	Italy
Pantalaskas	Paul Paviot	1960	France
Private Property	Leslie Stevens	1960	USA
Take a Giant Step	Philip Leacock	1959	USA
The League Of Gentlemen	Basil Dearden	1960	Great Britain
The 3 Worlds of Gulliver	Jack Sher	1960	Great Britain
Higher Principle	Jiří Krejčík	1960	Czech Republic
Wspolny Pokoi	Wojciek J. Has	1960	Poland
The Big Show	Francisco Rovira Beleta	1960	Spain
Questo amore ai confini del mondo	Giuseppe Maria Scotese		Argentina
Crack in the Mirror	Richard Fleischer	1960	USA
Denize Inen Sokak	Attila Tokatli	1960	Turkey
The Man in the Black Derby	Karl Suter	1960	Switzerland
Foma Gordeyev	Mark Donskoy	1959	Russia
Geiserland Der Südsee	Eugen Schuhmacher	1960	Germany
Hägringen	Peter Weiss	1959	Sudan
I'm All Right Jack	John Boulting	1959	Great Britain
Il bell'Antonio	Mauro Bolognini	1960	Italy
Kolybjelnaja	Mikhail Kalik	1960	Russia
L'assegno	Leopoldo Trieste	1960	Italy

==== Short films in Competition ====
Title	Director(s)	Production Country
Le Pilote M'A Dit	Heinrich Fueter	Switzerland
Le ragazze del sabato	Claudio Triscoli	Italy
Mama Lupita	Servando González	Mexico
Mesikni Pohadka	Zdeněk Miler	Czech Republic
Murzynek	Jadwiga Kedzierzawska, Jan Lskowski	Poland
Periyar	P.J. Thottan	India
Prijs De Zee	Herman van der Horst	Netherlands
Russkaja Narodnaja Igruschka	M. Tavrog	Russia
Simenon	Jean-François Hauduroy	France
The Blue of the Sky	John Ralmon	USA
The Leaky Faucet	Martin Taras	USA
The Minute and 1/2 Man	Dave Tendlar	USA
The Misunderstood Giant	Connie Rasinski	USA
Tri Muzi	Vladimir Lehky	Czech Republic
Un Atome Qui Vous Veut Du Bien	Henri Gruel	France
Viadotto sull'Aglio	Carlo Nebiolo	Italy
Wrajida	Arkadi Khintibizze	Russia
Art In The Western World	Milan Herzog	USA
Co Si O Nas Mysli	Dimitri Plichta	Czech Republic
Foofle's Train Ride	Dave Tendlar	USA
Glas	Bert Haanstra	Netherlands
Holiday In South India	Jagat Murari	India
La Lutte Contre Le Froid	Henri Gruel	France
La Vivienda	Julio García Espinosa	Cuba

=== Special Sections ===
==== Hommage to Luis Buñuel ====
Title	Director(s)	Year	Production Country
Robinson Crusoe	Luis Buñuel	1952	Mexico, USA
Land Without Bread	Luis Buñuel	1932	Spain
Los Olvidados	Luis Buñuel	1950	Mexico
Nazarin	Luis Buñuel	1958	Mexico
Mexican Bus Ride	Luis Buñuel	1951	Mexico
The Young One (La Joven)	Luis Buñuel	1960	Mexico, USA
Un Chien Andalou	Luis Buñuel	1929	France
Cela s'appelle l'aurore	Luis Buñuel	1955	France
Él	Luis Buñuel	1952	Mexico
The Criminal Life of Archibaldo de la Cruz	Luis Buñuel	1955	Mexico
L'Age d'Or	Luis Buñuel	1930	France
Death in the Garden	Luis Buñuel	1956	France

==== Youth and Cinema (Congrès Jeunesse et Cinema) ====
Title	Director(s)	Year	Production Country
Ace in the Hole	Billy Wilder	1951	USA

==== Out of Program ====
Title	Director(s)	Year	Production Country
The Devil Is a Woman	Josef von Sternberg	1935	USA
The Blue Angel	Josef von Sternberg	1930	Germany

== Awards ==
=== International Jury, Feature Films ===
- Golden Sail (top prize): Il bell'Antonio by Mauro Bolognini
- Silver Sail for Best Direction Prize: Mark Donskoy for the film Foma Gordeev
- Silver Sail for Best Actress: Jana Brejchová in Vissi Princip
- Silver Sail for Best Original Screenplay: Philippe de Broca for the film The Joker
- Silver Sail for Humanity and the Intensity of the Interpretation: Johnny Nash in Take a Giant Step
- Silver Sail for the Most Promising Actor: Franco Rossi in Death of a Friend

=== International Jury, Short Films ===
- Gold Sail, Short Films: Prijs de Zee by Herman Van der Horst
- Silver Sail for Animation Film, Short Films: Mesikni Pohadka by Zdeněk Miler

=== Jury of the Swiss Federation of Cine-Clubs ===
- Swiss Federation of Cine-Clubs Award: The Young One (La Joven) by Luis Buñuel
