= José Álvaro Morais =

Portuguese film director (1943–2004)

- Born: 2 September 1943; Coimbra, Portugal
- Died: 30 January 2004 (aged 60); Lisbon, Portugal
- Occupation: Film director

José Álvaro Morais (September 2, 1943 - January 30, 2004) was a Portuguese film director. His film O Bobo won the Golden Leopard at the 1987 Locarno International Film Festival.

== Filmography ==
- Cantigamente Nº 3 (1975)
- Ma Femme Chamada Bicho (1976)
- O Bobo (1987)
- Zéfiro (1993)
- Peixe Lua (2000)
- Quaresma (2003)
