= Three Bewildered People in the Night =

- Promotional poster
- Directed by: Gregg Araki
- Written by: Gregg Araki
- Produced by: Gregg Araki
- Starring: Darcy Marta; John Lacques; Mark Howell
- Cinematography: Gregg Araki
- Edited by: Gregg Araki
- Release date: August 11, 1987 (Locarno)
- Running time: 92 minutes
- Country: United States
- Language: English
- Budget: $5,000

Three Bewildered People in the Night is a 1987 American drama film directed by Gregg Araki in his feature film directorial debut. The film stars Darcy Marta, John Lacques, and Mark Howell. The film follows three characters through the dissolution of a heterosexual relationship and the possible beginning of a gay one.

== Plot ==
The film revolves around Alicia, a video artist, her live-in boyfriend Craig, a journalist and frustrated actor, and David, Alicia's best friend and a gay performance artist. Through a series of telephone calls and coffee shop conversations, Craig and Alicia split up and Craig and David take tentative steps toward a relationship.

== Cast ==
- Darcy Marta as Alicia
- John Lacques as Craig
- Mark Howell as David

== Production ==
Gregg Araki shot Three Bewildered People in the Night on a budget of $5,000. He shot in black and white using a spring-wound Bolex camera. The film is an example of guerrilla filmmaking, with Araki shooting in unauthorized locations without permits.

== Reception ==
Three Bewildered People in the Night won the Bronze Leopard (for technical achievements) and the Critics' Prize (FIPRESCI) at the 1987 Locarno International Film Festival.

== Bibliography ==
- Levy, Emanuel (2001). Cinema of Outsiders: The Rise of American Independent Film. NYU Press. ISBN 0814751245.
- Timmons, Stuart (February 2, 1988). "Bewildered, Bothered, and Brilliant: A Young Gay Filmmaker Lights Up the Screen". In Review. The Advocate. No. 491. pp. 38, 62. ProQuest 2371000960.
