= 14th Locarno Film Festival =

Film festival in Locarno, Switzerland

- Opening film: Blast of Silence directed by Allen Baron
- Location: Locarno, Switzerland
- Founded: 1946
- Awards: Golden Sail: Fires on the Plain directed by Kon Ichikawa
- Festival date: Opening: 19 July 1961; Closing: 30 July 1961
- Website: Locarno Film Festival

Locarno Film Festival
- 15th 13th

The 14th Locarno Film Festival was held from 19 to 30 July 1961 in Locarno, Switzerland. The festival opened with Allen Baron's film Blast of Silence, which went on to win the Swiss jury award. Julio Garcia Espinosa attended the festival with Cuba Dances, which according to him was the first picture from the newly nationalized Cuban film industry to compete at a "top-level" film festival in the "West".

The main prize of the festival, the Golden Sail, was awarded to Fires on the Plain directed by Kon Ichikawa.

== Official Sections ==
The following films were screened in these sections:

=== Main Program ===
==== Feature Films In Competition ====
Highlighted title indicates winner of the Golden Sail

Original Title	English Title	Director(s)	Year	Production Country
Blast Of Silence		Allen Baron	1961	USA
Cuba Baila	Cuba Dances	Julio García Espinosa	1961	Cuba, Mexico
Die Zukunft Ist Fällig	The Future is Due	Günter Gräwert, Mauritz E. Houck	1961	Switzerland
Fantasmi A Roma	Ghosts of Rome	Antonio Pietrangeli	1961	Italia
La Pyramide Humaine	The Human Pyramid	Jean Rouch	1961	France
Ludzie Z Pociagu	People from the Train	Kazimierz Kutz	1961	Poland
Moya Tai	My	Xu Tao		China
Mutter Courage Und Ihre Kinder	Mother Courage and Her Children	Peter Palitzsch, Manfed Wekwerth	1961	Germany
Nobi	Fires on the Plain	Kon Ichikawa	1959	Japan
Nocni Host	Night Host	Otakar Vávra	1961	Czech Republic
Odissea Nuda	Naked Odyssey	Franco Rossi	1961	Italia
Proshaite, Golubi	Pray, Golubi	Yakov Seguel	1961	Russia
Quand Nous Etions Petits Enfants	When We Were Children	Henry Brandt	1961	Switzerland
Scano Boa	Good Scano	Renato Dall'Ara	1961	Italia
Schwarzer Kies	Black Gravel	Helmuth Käutner	1961	Germany
The Connection		Shirley Clarke	1961	USA
The Greengage Summer		Lewis Gilbert	1961	Great Britain
Tire-Au-Flanc	Flank	François Truffaut, Claude de Givray	1960	France
Two Rode Together		John Ford	1961	USA
Un Taxi Pour Tobrouck	A Taxi for Tobrouck	Denis de la Patellière	1960	France

==== Short Films In Competition ====
Original Title	English Title	Director(s)	Year	Production Country
Amig A Tawasz Ujra Eljön	Until Spring Comes Again	Mihaly Hars		Hungary
Comme Un Poisson Dans L'Eau	Like a Fish in Water	G. Dubucq, A. Lefert		Belgium
D'Un Jour A L'Autre	From One Day to the Next	Jean-Louis Roy		Switzerland
Detza I Glaroussi	Detza	Guéorgui Alaorkov		Bulgaria
Koncert	Concert	Zbigniew Czernelecki		Poland
L'Oiseau En Papier Journal	The Newspaper Bird	Julien Pappe		France
La Conquista Della Più Alta Vetta Del Mondo	The Conquest of the Highest Peak in the World	Wu Chun, Hsiaoying Ying		China
La Terra Che Non Ride	The Land that Does not Laugh	Giuseppe Fina		Italia
Le Signore	The Ladies	Michele Gandin		Italia
Le Silence	Silence	Édouard Luntz		France
Malovani Pro Kocku	Paint	Břetislav Pojar		Czech Republic
Na Ozerakh Kauakhstana		Aleksandr Zguridi		Russia
National Youth Orchestra		Robert Lapresle		New Zealand
Neposlouchnoto Kote	Unideline	Marcela Dimitrova	1961	Bulgaria
Photo Souvenir	Souvenir Photo	Henri Fabiani		France
Pratele Na Sirkach	Prattle	Jan Kluge		Czech Republic
Rabindranath Tagore		Satyajit Ray		India
Railroaded To Fame		Dave Tendlar		USA
Ramuz, Passage D'Un Poete	Ramuz, Passage of a Poet	Alain Tanner		Switzerland
The First Fast Mail		Dave Tendlar	1961	USA
The House Of Treasures		Mushir Ahmed		India
The Temples Of Halebib And Belur		Ram Gabale		India
Ucieczka Toma	Tom's Escape	Janusz Nasfeter		Poland
Xiaokedou Zhao Mama	ξ AO Tadpole Zhao Mama	Jiajun Qian, Te Wei		China

=== Out of Competition ===
==== Feature Films - Out of Competition ====
Original Title	English Title	Director(s)	Year	Production Country
El Brazo Fuerte	The Strong Arm	Giovanni Korporaal	1958	Mexico
Paris Nous Appartient	Paris Belongs to Us	Jacques Rivette	1960	France
Saturday Night and Sunday Morning		Karel Reisz	1960	Great Britain
Viridiana		Luis Buñuel	1961	Spain

==== Short Films Out of Competition ====
Original Title	English Title	Director(s)	Year	Production Country
Amadeo De Souza-Cardoso		Armando da Silva Brandao		Portugal
Andacollo		Jorge Di Lauro, Nieves Yankovic		Chile
Arraial Do Cabo		Paulo Sareceni		Brazil
Bazan	I'm N't	Ramiro Tamayo		Argentina
Dagen Mijne Jaren	Days My Years	Max de Haas		Netherlands
Tetes Blanches	White Heads	Guy L. Coté		Canada

=== Special Sections - Tribute to ===
Tribute To Fritz Lang
Original Title	English Title	Director(s)	Year	Production Country
Das Testament Der Dr. Mabuse	The Testament of Dr. Mabuse	Fritz Lang		Germany
Der Müde Tod	Destiny	Fritz Lang	1921	Germany
Die Nibelungen	Die Nibelungen	Fritz Lang		Germany
Dr. Mabuse, Der Spiegel	Dr. Mabuse, the Mirror	Fritz Lang		Germany
Frau Im Mond	Woman in the Moon	Fritz Lang		Germany
Hangmen Street		Fritz Lang	1942	USA
Liliom	Lily	Fritz Lang		France
M. Eine Stadt Sucht Einen Morder	M. a City is Looking for a Murderer	Fritz Lang		Germany
Metropolis		Fritz Lang	1926	Germany
Scarlet Street		Fritz Lang	1945	USA
Secret Beyond The Door		Fritz Lang	1945	USA
Spione	Spies	Fritz Lang		Germany
You Only Live Once		Fritz Lang	1936	USA
Die Spinne	The Spider	Fritz Lang	1919	Germany
Tribute To Georges Méliès (1861-1938)
A La Conquete Du Pole	At the Pole Conquest	Georges Méliès	1912	France
Barbe-Bleue	Bluebeard	Georges Méliès	1901	France
Eruption Volcanique A La Martinique	Volcanic Eruption in Martinique	Georges Méliès	1902	France
Hydrotherapie Fantastique	Fantastic Hydrotherapy	Georges Méliès	1909	France
L'Affaire Dreyfus	The Dreyfus Affair	Georges Méliès	1898	France
L'Aquarium Aux Poissons D'Or (?)	The Goldfish Aquarium (?)	Georges Méliès		France
L'Homme A La Tête De Caoutchouc	The Man Has the Rubber Head	Georges Méliès	1902	France
Le Banquet De Mesmer	Mesmer's Banquet	Georges Méliès	1905	France
Le Brahmane Et Le Papillon	The Brahmane and the Butterfly	Georges Méliès	1901	France
Le Chevalier Des Neiges	The Snow Knight	Georges Méliès	1912	France
Le Locataire Diabolique	The Diabolical Tenant	Georges Méliès	1909	France
Le Magicien	The Magician	Georges Méliès	1898	France
Le Melomane	The Melobe	Georges Méliès	1903	France
Le Merveilleux Eventail Vivant	The Wonderful Living Event	Georges Méliès	1904	France
Le Palais Des Mille Et Une Nuits	The Palais of Thousand and One Nights	Georges Méliès	1905	France
Le Royaume Des Fees	The Kingdom of Fees	Georges Méliès	1903	France
Le Tunnel Sous La Manche	The Channel Tunnel	Georges Méliès	1907	France
Le Voyage A Travers L'Impossible	The Journey Through the Impossible	Georges Méliès	1904	France
Les Bulles De Savon Viviantes	Viviant Soap Bubbles	Georges Méliès	1906	France
Les Hallucinations Du Baron De Münchenhausen	LES HALCUCIZATIONS YOU BUCH BARNING the MUNSTENDHER	Georges Méliès	1911	France
Les Rose Magiques	Magic Rose	Georges Méliès	1903	France
Professeur Lusticus (?)	Professor Lusticus (?)	Georges Méliès		France
Trouble Apres Whisky (?)		Georges Méliès		France
Voyage Dans La Lune	Moon Trip	Georges Méliès	1902	France

== Official Awards ==
=== International Jury, feature films ===
- Golden Sail: FIRES ON THE PLAIN directed by Kon Ichikawa.
- Silver Sail: LUDZIE Z POCIAGU by Kazimierz Kutz, QUAND NOUS ETIONS PETITS ENFANTS by Herny Brandt
- Best First Feature Prize: THE CONNECTION by Shirley Clarke

=== International Jury, short films ===
- Golden Sail, Short Films: RABINDRANATH TAGORE by Satyajit Ray
- Silver Sail, Short Films: XIAOKEDOU ZHAO MAMA by Te Wei and Jiajun Qian

=== Swiss critics Jury ===
- Swiss critics award: BLAST OF SILENCE by Allen Baron

=== FIPRESCI Jury ===
- FIPRESCI Award: PROSHAITE, GOLUBI by Yakov Seguel
