= 12th Locarno Film Festival =

Film festival in Locarno, Switzerland

- Festival official poster
- Location: Locarno, Switzerland
- Founded: 1946
- Festival date: Opening: 9 July 1959; Closing: 19 July 1959
- Website: Locarno Film Festival

Locarno Film Festival
- 13th 11th

The 12th Locarno Film Festival was held from 9 to 19 July 1959 in Locarno, Switzerland. The International Critics Awards for best picture, later called the FIPRESCI award, was awarded to Al Capone directed by Richard Wilson. Ernest Borgnine won the best actor award for his performance in The Rabbit Trap by the international jury. After the Swiss government allow the festival to ask for film through diplomatic channels, the festival achieved an A-ranking under the FIAPF this year. As a result, the festival could feature a approved competition and prizes.

== Official Sections ==
The following films were screened in these sections:

=== Main Program ===
Main Program / Feature Films In Competition

Original Title	English Title	Director(s)	Year	Production Country
Al Capone		Richard Wilson	1959	USA
Araya		Margot Bénacerraf	1959	Venezuela, France
Crni Biseri	Black Pearls	Tomo Janis	1958	Yugoslavia
I Soliti Ignoti	Big Deal on Madonna Street	Mario Monicelli	1958	Italy
Kapitanskaia Dotschka	The Captain's Daughter	Vladimir Kaplounovsky	1959	Russia
Killer's Kiss		Stanley Kubrick	1955	USA
L'Ambitieuse	The Ambitious	Yves Allégret	1959	France, Australia
Les Dragueurs	Dredgers	Jean-Pierre Mocky	1959	France
Les Quatre Du Moana	The Four of Moana	Bernard Gorsky, Pierre Pasquier	1959	France
Linje Sex	Line Six	Bengt Blomgren	1958	Sudan
Mogli Pericolose	Dangerous Wives	Luigi Comencini	1958	Italy
Moi, Un Noir	I, a Negro	Jean Rouch	1958	France
Next To No Time		Henry Cornelius	1958	Great Britain
Ovecoch Nadprirozonych	Ohoch Nadprrosonych	Jiri Krejcik, Milos Makovec	1958	Czech Republic
Pozegnania	Farewells	Wojciek J. Has	1958	Poland
The Rabbit Trap		Philip Leacock	1959	USA
Un Vaso De Whisky	A Glass of Whiskey	Julio Coll	1958	Spain
Unruhige Nacht	Restless Night	Flak Harnack	1958	Germany
Warlock		Edward Dmytryk	1959	USA

Main Program / Short Films In Competition

Original Title	English Title	Director(s)	Year	Production Country
A Monguzok Szigeten	On the Monguzok Island	Agoston Kollang		Hungary
A Tale Of A Dog		David Tendlar		USA
A.B.C. Aruba, Bonaire, Curacao		John Fernout		Netherlands
Bapu-Ka-Dalidan		Ananda Kumar		India
Clobber'S Ballet Ache		Connie Rasinsky		USA
Das Knalleidoskop	The Bang Oscop	Herbert Hunger		Germany
Daumier		Roger Leenhardt, Henri Sarrade		France
De Brosses A Roma	From Brushes to Roma	Massimo Mida		Italy
Det Nya Ansiktet	The New Face	Alex Jute		Sudan
Geiranger		Carsten Monch		Norway
Geometrie, Sprache Der Formen	Geometry, Language of Shapes	Dieter Schönbach		Germany
Highway		Hillary Harris		USA
Janela Aberta	Open Window	Armando Silva Brandao		Portugal
Jean-Jacques Rousseau		Roger Leenhardt, Jean-Pierre Viret		France
Krafttag	Power	Alex Jute		Sudan
L'Armee De Pierre	Stone Army	Theo van Hare Norman		Netherlands
L'Arte D'Ingannare I Posteri	The D’ Endnary Artes the Posters	Renzo Renzi		Italy
La Mer Et Les Jours	The Sea and the Days	Alain Kamiker, Raymondl Voge		France
La Vita Semplice	Simple Life	Nelo Risi		Italy
Le Peuple Assassine	The Murderous People	Jacques Rial		Switzerland
Lui Et Elle	Her and Her	Jean Jabely		France
Lumiere De Fete	Girls' Worlds	François Bardet, Jean-Louis Roy		Switzerland
Model Toshshinka	Model Toshinda	Masaya Nakamura		Japan
Ondraszek	Semondras	Waclaw Kondek		Poland
Pajacyk I Pikus	Pajacyk and Pikus	Wladislaw Nehrebecki		Poland
Pierres Vives	Live Stones	John Ford		Canada
Railroaders		Guy Côté		Canada
Sidney Family Tree		Art Bartsch		USA
Signed, Sealed And Clobbered		Connie Rasinsky		USA
Street To The World		Louis-Georges Carrier		Canada
The Fabulous Firework Family		Al Kouzel		USA
Tragedie Vodnikova		Josef Kabrt		Czech Republic
Tscherez Porogui Jenissey	Through the Thresholds of the Yenisei	E. Legat		Russia
Uzel	Node	Hermína Týrlová		Czech Republic

=== Special Sections - Films For Children ===
Films For Children - Program 1
Original Title	English Title	Director(s)	Year	Production Country
Der Wolf Und Diesieben Jungen Geisslein	The Wolf and the Seven Young Geisslein	Peter Podehl	1957	Germany
La Foret Est Un Tresor	The Forest is a Treasure	Roger Blais	1959	Canada
Le Poney	The Pony	Lawrence Cherry		Canada
Liska A Dzaban	Joja	Stanislav Latal, Jiri Zrnka	1947	Czech Republic
Liska A Vlk	Liska and Wolf	Eduard Hofmann	1956	Czech Republic
Films For Children - Program 2
Jour De Juin	June	Louis Partugais	1958	Canada
Kalamajka		Hermína Týrlová	1957	Czech Republic
L'Ile Aux Oiseaux	Ile Aux Oiseaux	Marc de Gastyne		France
L'Ile Du Saint Laurent	The Island of Saint Laurent	Raymond Garceau	1956	Canada
Rubezahl, Herr Der Berge	Rube Number, Lord of the Mountains	Erich Kobler	1957	Germany
Ti-Jean Au Pays Du Fer	Ti-Jean in the Land Country	Raymond Garceau		Canada

=== Retrospective ===
Retrospective Ingmar Bergman
Original Title	English Title	Director(s)	Year	Production Country
Fängelse	Prison	Ingmar Bergman		Sweden
Gyklarnas Afton	The Fun Evening	Ingmar Bergman	1953	Sweden
Hets	Torment	Alf Sjöberg	1944	Sudan
Kninnodröm		Ingmar Bergman	1954	Sweden
Kvinna Utan Ansikte	Woman without Face	Gustav Molander	1944	Sudan
Musik I Mörker	Music in Darkness	Ingmar Bergman	1947	Sweden
Näre Livet	When Life	Ingmar Bergman	1957	Sweden
Sommeren Med Monika	The Summer with Monika	Ingmar Bergman	1952	Sweden
Sommernattens Leende	Summer Night's Smile	Ingmar Bergman	1955	Sweden

== Official Awards ==
=== International Jury, feature films ===
- Award for the best direction: Stanley Kubrick for the film KILLER’S KISS
- Special Mention: OVECOCH NADPRIROZONYCH by Jiri Krejcik
- Best Actor: Ernest Borgnine in THE RABBIT TRAP
- Most spectacular: KAPITANSKAIA DOTSCHKA by Vladimir Kaplounovsky
- Funniest Film: I SOLITI IGNOTI by Mario Monicelli
- Best documentary: MOI, UN NOIR by Jean Rouch

=== International Jury, Short films ===
- Honor Mention, Short Films: JEAN-JACQUES ROUSSEAU by Jean-Pierre Viret and Roger Leenhardt, DAUMIER by Henri Sarrade and Roger Leenhardt
- Best animation film, short films: LUI ET ELLE by Jean Jabely
- Mention, Short Films: GEOMETRIE, SPRACHE DER FORMEN by Dieter Schönbach
- Best techniques, short films: UZEL by Hermina Tyrlova
- Best Documentary, Short Films: LA MER ET LES JOURS by Raymondi Voge

=== FIPRESCI Jury ===
- FIPRESCI Mention: POZEGNANIA by Wojciek J. Has
- FIPRESCI Jury: AL CAPONE by Richard Wilson
