= 11th Locarno Film Festival =

Film festival in Locarno, Switzerland

- Location: Locarno, Switzerland
- Founded: 1946
- Awards: Golden Sail winner Ten North Frederick directed by Philip Dunne
- Festival date: Opening: 26 July 1958; Closing: 10 August 1958
- Website: Locarno Film Festival

Locarno Film Festival
- 12th 10th

The 11th Locarno Film Festival was held from 26 July to 10 August 1958 in Locarno, Switzerland.

The winner of the Golden Sail, which was the festival's main prize prior to the Golden Leopard, was awarded to Ten North Frederick directed by Philip Dunne. The festival had retrospective screenings including a section paying tribute to Humphrey Bogart.

== Official Sections ==
The following films were screened in these sections:

=== Main Program ===
==== Main Program / Feature Films In Competition ====
Original Title	English Title	Director(s)	Year	Production Country
A Q Zhenzhuan	The True Story of Ah Q	Yuan Yang'an	1958	Hong Kong
Amore E Chiacchiere	Love and Chatter	Alessandro Blasetti	1958	Italy
Artisti Cirka	Artisti Approx	L. Kristi	1957	Russia
Bomba		Jaroslav Balik	1957	Czech Republic
Cowboy		Delmer Daves	1958	USA
Der Achte Wochentag	The Eighth Day of the Week	Aleksandr Ford	1958	Germany, Poland
El Pisito	The Little Apartment	Marco Ferreri, Isidoro M. Ferry	1958	Spain
How To Murder A Rich Uncle		Nigel Patrick	1957	Great Britain
Ingen Morgondag	No Tomorrow	Arne Mattson	1957	Sudan
Ladro Lui, Ladra Lei	He Thief, She Thief	Luigi Zampa	1958	Italy
Le Beau Serge	Handsome Serge	Claude Chabrol	1958	France
Nata Di Marzo	March's Child	Antonio Pietrangeli	1958	Italy
Petersburger Nächte	Petersburg Nights	Paul Martin	1958	Germany
Shorisha	The Champion	Umeji Inoue	1957	Japan
Siostry	Sisters	Grigori Rochal	1958	Russia
The Vikings		Richard Fleischer	1958	USA

==== Main Program / Feature Films Out of Competition ====
Original Title	English Title	Director(s)	Year	Production Country
Letjat Juravli	The Cranes Are Flying	Mikhail Kalatozov	1957	Russia
Visage De Bronze	Bronze Face	Bernand Taizant	1958	Switzerland
Vynaez Zkazy	Invention for Destruction	Karel Zeman	1958	Czech Republic

==== Main Program / Short Films In Competition ====
Original Title	English Title	Director(s)	Year	Production Country
Blume, Campeon D'Europa	Blume, Champion of Europe	Isidoro M. Ferry		Spain
Capodimonte		Vittorio Sala		Italia
Castelli Della Loira		Franco Cauli		Italia
Children's Corner		Walter Lassally, Léo Nadelmann		Great Britain
Cinema Total		G. Vallet		Switzerland
Clam Clobber		David Tendlar		USA
Dustcap Doormat		Al Kouzel		USA
Gaston Go Home		Connie Rasinsky		USA
Gente Dell'Etna	People of Etna	Corrado Sofia		Italia
It's A Crime		Wolf Koenig	1957	Canada
Königin Im Frauenreich	Queen in the Women's Empire	Hans Zickendraht		Switzerland
La Vie Et L'Oeuvre D'Andre Malraux	Andre Malraux's Life and Work	Léonard Keigel		France
Le Grand Voyage	The Big Trip	Eduard Luntz, Georges Pessis		Greece
Le Guardie Del Sole	The Guards of the Sun	Virgilio Tosi		Italia
Le Merle	The Mongle	Norman McLaren	1958	Canada
Obi, Reda Sibirskaia	Obi, Redda Siberscaia	Aleksandr Sukomlinov		Russia
Paisani	Villagers	Enrico Moscatelli		Italia
Pan Prokouk Pritel Zviratek	Mr. Prokoukr from Zviratek	Karel Zeman		Czech Republic
Sintra		João Mendes		Portugal
Springtime For Clobber		Connie Rasinsky		USA
Tance Ostrova Bali	Dancing of Bali Island	Jindrich Ferenc		Czech Republic
Ten North Frederick		Philip Dunne	1958	USA
The Juggler Of Our Lady		Al Kouzel		USA
The Loon'S Necklace		Larry Gosnell		Canada
Transcontinental		A.M. Sullivan		USA
Une Lettre	A Letter	G. Vallet		Switzerland
Vertical Flight				USA
Viaggio Nelle Terre Basse	Journey to the Lower Lands	Giulio Questi		Italia
Vystvarna Vychova Na Materskych Skolach	Artistic Education in Maternity School	Jiri Jerabek		Czech Republic
Wild Race For Glory		Alessandro D'Eva		USA
Freud Der Bienen	Freud of the Bees	Hans Zickendraht		Switzerland

=== Special Sections ===
Original Title	English Title	Director(s)	Year	Production Country
Feature Films Outside of Program
Jonas		Ottomar Domnick, Herbert Vessely	1957	Germany
Nachts, Wenn Der Teufel Kam	The Devil Strikes at Night	Robert Siodmark	1957	Germany
Cast a Dark Shadow		Levis Gilbert	1955	Great Britain
Tribute To Humphrey Bogart (1899-1957)
Angels With Dirty Faces		Michael Curtiz	1938	USA
Deadline U.S.A.		Rickard Brooks	1952	USA
High Sierra		Raoul Walsh	1941	USA
The Big Shot		Lewis Seiler	1942	USA
The Caine Mutiny		Edward Dmytryk	1954	USA
The Oklahoma Kid		Lloyd Bacon	1939	USA
They Drive By Night		Raoul Walsh	1940	USA
Tribute To Norman Mclaren
A Chairy Tale		Norman McLaren	1957	Canada
Begone Dull Care		Norman McLaren	1949	Canada
Blinkity Blank		Norman McLaren	1955	Canada
Neighbours		Norman McLaren	1952	Canada
Pen, Point, Percussion		Norman McLaren	1951	Canada
Poulette Grise	Gray Chicken	Norman McLaren	1947	Canada
International Youth Film Review
Arctic Dog Team		Douglas Wilkinson		Canada
Broncho Busters		Budd Boetticher		Canada
Cadet Rousselle		George Dunning, Colin Low	1947	Canada
Family Tree		E. Rathburt		Canada
Gaston Go Home		Connie Rasinsky	1958	USA
Honzikova Cesta	Honzik's Journey	Milan Vosmik	1956	Czech Republic
Ishiyama No Uta	Ishiyama's Song	Satok Takashi		Japan
Königin In Frauenreich	Queen in Frauenreich	Hans Zickendraht	1957	Switzerland
La Passe' Du Diable	The Devil's Pass'	Jacques Dupont, Pierre Schoendoerfer	1958	France
Paraplicko		Břetislav Pojar	1957	Czech Republic
Sur Le Pont D'Avignon	On the Avignon Bridge	Serge Ladouceur, Grant Munro	1951	Canada
The Land Of The Long Day		Douglas Wilkinson	1952	Canada
The World At Your Feet		Larry Gosnell		Canada
Freund Der Bienen	Friend of the Bees	Hans Zickendraht		Switzerland
A Thousand Million Years		Tom Daly, Colin Low	1954	Canada
Tribute To the National Office of Canada Film (ONF)
City Of Gold		Wolf Koenig, Colin Low	1957	Canada
Corral		Colin Low	1954	Canada
Romance Of Transportation		Wolf Koenig, Colin Low	1953	Canada
Shyness/Timidite		Stanley Jackson	195	Canada
The Land Of The Long Day		Douglas Wilkinson	1952	Canada
A Thousand Million Years		Tom Daly, Colin Low	1954	Canada
Tribute To the National Office of Canada Film (ONF) / Special Sections Revue International of the Film For Youth
A Thousand Million Years		Colin Low	1952	Canada

== Official Awards ==
=== Feature films Jury ===
- Golden Sail: TEN NORTH FREDERICK by Philip Dunne
- Silver Sail for the Best Director: Claude Chabrol for the film LE BEAU SERGE
- Silver Sail for Best Actor: Kwan Shan in The True Story of Ah Q
- Silver Sail for Best Actress: Carla Gravina in LOVE AND CHATTER
- Mention for Artistic and Human Qualities: EL PISITO by Marco Ferreri and Isidoro M. Ferry, COWBOY by Delmer Daves, The True Story of Ah Q by Yuan Yang’an

=== Short films Jury ===
- Golden Sail, Short Films: THE JUGGLER OF OUR LADY by Al Kouzel, PAISANI by Enrico Moscatelli
- Mention for the Cultural Film: LA VIE ET L’OEUVRE D’ANDRE MALRAUX by Léonard Keigel

=== FIPRESCI ===
- FIPRESCI Award: EL PISITO by Marco Ferreri and Isidoro M. Ferry

=== Jury of radio televisione svizzera italiana ===
- Prize of the Jury radio televisione svizzera italiana: PARAPLICKO di Bretislav Pojar
