= Hermína Týrlová =

Czech animator (1900–1993)

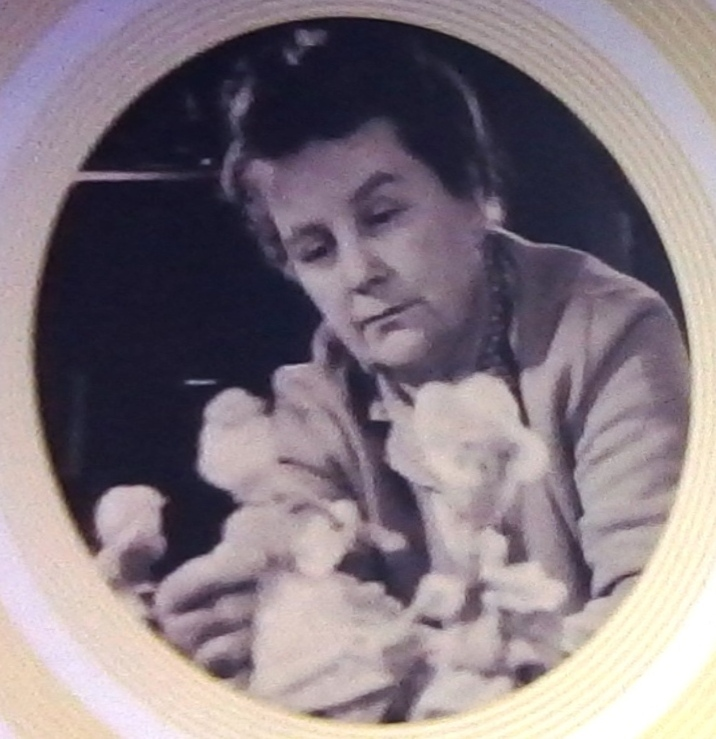

Hermína Týrlová (11 December 1900 in Březové Hory – 3 May 1993 in Zlín) was a prominent Czech animator, screen writer, and film director. She was often called the mother of Czech animation. Over the course of her career, she produced over 60 animated children's short films using puppets and the technique of stop motion animation.

== Life and career ==
Born in Březové Hory in Central Bohemia, Hermína Týrlová learned puppet-making skills from her father, who was a woodworker and made small wood figurines. As a teenager, she moved to Prague to make a living acting, singing, and dancing in vaudeville. She also began writing and illustrating children's magazines. In 1925, she joined Studio AB, where she met her future husband, Karel Dodal. The studio produced animated films for advertising companies such as Elektrajournal and IRE-Film. Dodal and Týrlová produced 5 animated advertising films together, and in 1935, they co-directed the first commercial Czech puppet animation film, Tajemství Lucerny ("The Lantern's Secret").

Following the 1939 German occupation of Czechoslovakia, Karel Dodal took exile in the United States and then Argentina. Týrlová chose to remain in Czechoslovakia. In 1941, she moved to Zlín in eastern Moravia to work with Ladislav Kolda at Bata Studios, where she remained for the rest of her life. In 1944, she released the short film Ferda Mravenec ("Fernando the Ant"), which achieved worldwide popularity. The original puppet for the main character is on display in the Toy Museum in Figueres, Spain. In 1947, she co-directed Vzpoura Hracek ("Revolt of the Toys") with Frantisek Sadek, which combined stop-motion animation with live action footage.

She continued to write and direct animated films until 1986, and she died in Zlín on May 3, 1993 at the age of 92.

== Awards ==
Throughout the course of her career, Hermína Týrlová earned multiple international awards for her work, including awards at Venice, Cannes, Locarno, and Mar Del Plata. In 1952, she received the State Prize of the Czechoslovakia. She received an award for her life's work at the 1981 Paris International Film Festival.

== Filmography ==
- 1928 - Zamilovaný Vodník
- November 4, 1936 - Hra bublinek
- 1938 - Tajemství Lucerny
- February 28, 1943 - Ferda Mravenec ( "Fernando the Ant")
- February 3, 1946 - Vzpoura hraček ( "Revolt of the Toys")
- January 1, 1948 - Ukolébavka ( "Lullaby")
- 1956 - Míček Flíček
- September 20, 1957 - Kalamajka
- January 1, 1958 - Pasáček vepřů, Uzel na kapesníku
- January 1, 1959 - Vláček kolejáček, Ztracená panenka ("The Little Train", "The Lost Doll")
- 1960 - Den odplaty
- January 1, 1961 - Zvědavé psaníčka
- January 1, 1962 - DVE klubíčka
- January 1, 1963 - Kulička
- 1964 - Vlněná pohádka
- January 1, 1965 - Modrá zástěrka ("The Little Blue Apron")
- January 1, 1966 - Snehulák
- 1969 - Hvězda Betlémská

November 15, 1974 - klukovy klukoviny ("The Mischievous Boy")

- 1978 - Příhody brouka Pytlíka
- January 1, 1985 - Opičí láska
- January 1, 1986 - Pohádka na šňůře ("I Count on the Wire")
