= 16th Locarno Film Festival =

Film festival in Locarno, Switzerland

- Opening film: The Four Days of Naples directed by Nanni Loy
- Location: Locarno, Switzerland
- Founded: 1946
- Awards: Golden Sail: Transport from Paradise directed by Zbynek Brynych
- Festival date: Opening: 17 July 1963; Closing: 28 July 1963
- Website: Locarno Film Festival

Locarno Film Festival
- 17th 15th

The 16th Locarno Film Festival was held from 17 to 28 July 1963 in Locarno, Switzerland. The festival featured the premiere of Lina Wertmüller's first feature film,The Lizards. The opening film of the festival was The Four Days of Naples directed by Nanni Loy.

The top prize of the festival, the Golden Sail, was awarded to Transport from Paradise directed by Zbynek Brynych.

== Official Sections ==
The following films were screened in these sections:

=== Main Program ===
==== Feature Films In Competition ====
Highlighted title indicates winner of the Golden Sail

Original Title	English Title	Director(s)	Year	Production Country
Antes De Anochecer	Before Dusk	German Lorente	1963	Spain
Hallelujah The Hills		Adolfas Mekas	1963	USA
Hitler...Connais Pas	Hitler ... Don't Know	Bertrand Blier	1963	France
I Basilischi	The Lizards	Lina Wertmüller	1963	Italia
Im Pokoriaetsa Nebo	They Conquer the Skies	Tatiana Lioznova	1963	Russia
Les Grand Chemins	Large Paths	Christian Marquand	1963	France
Luciano		Gian Vittorio Baldi	1960	Italia
Manlo Hua	Assumed	Chao Huan-Chang, Fan Lai		China
Otoshiana	Pitfalls	Hiroshi Teshigahara	1962	Japan
Seul Ou Avec D'Autres	Alone or with Others	Michel Brault, Gilles Gilles Groulx	1962	Canada
Transport Z Raje	Transport from Paradise	Zbynek Brynych	1962	Czech Republic
Tuulinen Päivä	Windy Day	Eino Ruutsalo	1962	Finland
Zloto	Zloty	Wojciech Has	1962	Poland

==== Short Films In Competition ====
Original Title	English Title	Director(s)	Year	Production Country
A Bell For Philadelphia		Bob Kuwahara		USA
Acharya Vinoba Bhave		Vishram Bedekar		India
Acqua Di Roma	Water of Rome	Boud Smit		Netherlands
Aquedotto Felice	Happy Aqueduct	Antonio Calenda		Italia
Automania 2000		John Halas		Great Britain
Az Ja Budu Velky	When I will be Big	Vaclav Bedrich		Czech Republic
Francis Bacon		David Thompson		Great Britain
Glasmosaik	Glass Mosaic	Tue Ritzau		Denmark
Grande Dixence	Great Dixence	Guido Franco		Switzerland
Grazia E Numeri	Grace and Numbers	Luigi Di Gianni		Italia
Honorable Paint In The Neck		Bob Kuwahara		USA
Höchst	Maximum	Heinz-Jürgen Priebe		Germany
Icarus Montgolfier Wright		Osmond Evans		USA
Isola Di Varano	Varano Island	Carlo Di Carlo		Italia
Jain Temples Of India		Arun Chaudhuri		India
Kak Kotenku Poctroili Dom	Like a Kitten Built a House	R. Katchanov		Russia
L'Abrivade	T	Olivier Gendebien, Jacqueline Grigaut-Lefèvre		France
L'Ergastolana	Life Sentence	Domenico Barnabei		Italia
L'Ile D'Omere	L'watching D'offere	A.F. Sulk		Tunisia
La Chance Des Autres	The Luck of Others	Henry Brandt		Switzerland
Les Bucherons De La Manouane	Manouane Bush	Arthur Lamothe		Canada
Les Jojos		Jean Dasque		France
River Idyll		S.A. Agha		Pakistan
Saturday Parade		Malcolm Lomberg		South Africa
The Winner		Bertram Brown		USA
To Be Or Not To Be		Connie Rasinsky		USA
Underground Centenary		Rhonda Small		Great Britain
W Matni	In the Matti	Stefan Janik		Poland
Year Of The Rat		Martus Granirer, Jon Wing Lum		USA

=== Out of Competition (Fuori Concorso) ===
Main Program / Feature Films Out of Competition

Original Title	English Title	Director(s)	Year	Production Country
Az Angyalok Földje	The Land of Angels	György Révész	1962	Hungary
Az Prijde Kocour	The Cassandra Cat	Vojtech Jasny	1963	Czech Republic
Boudu Sauve Des Eaux		Jean Renoir	1932	France
Die Endlose Nacht	The Endless Night	Will Tremper	1963	West Germany
Il Gattopardo	The Gotopardo	Luchino Visconti	1963	Italia
Le Quattro Giornate Di Napoli	The Four Days of Naples	Nanni Loy	1962	Italia
Raices De Piedra	Stone Roots	José Maria Arzuaga	1961	Colombia
Seppuku	Harakiri	Msaki Kobayashi	1962	Japan
The Man From The Diner's Club		Frank Tashlin	1963	USA
Tiburoneros		Luis Alcoriza	1963	Mexico

Main Program / Short Films Out of Competition

Original Title	English Title	Director(s)	Year	Production Country
A Fleur D'Eau	Water Flower	Rob Gnant, Alexander J. Seiler		
La Jetee	No Getti	Chris Marker		France

=== Special Sections ===
Special Sections / Off-Program Films
Original Title	English Title	Director(s)	Year	Production Country
Deja S'Envole La Fleur Maigre	Already Flies the Skinny Flower	Paul Meyer	1960	Belgium
Mourir A Madrid	Die in Madrid	Frédéric Rossif	1963	France
Passaros De Asas Cortadas	Cut Wings Passers	Artur Ramos	1963	Portugal
Tlayucan		Luis Alcoriza	1962	Mexico

==== Tribute To John Ford ====
Tribute To John Ford
Original Title	English Title	Director(s)	Year	Production Country
Drums Along The Mohawk		John Ford	1939	USA
Fort Apache		John Ford	1947	USA
Four Sons		John Ford	1928	USA
How Green Was My Valley		John Ford	1941	USA
My Darling Clementine		John Ford	1946	USA
Stagecoach		John Ford	1939	USA
The Grapes Of Wrath		John Ford	1940	USA
The Informer		John Ford	1935	USA
The Iron Horse		John Ford	1924	USA
The Long Voyage Home		John Ford	1940	USA
The Lost Patrol		John Ford	1934	USA
The Whole Town'S Talking		John Ford	1935	USA
Tobacco Road		John Ford	1941	USA

== Official Awards ==
=== International Jury, feature films ===
- Golden Sail: Transport from Paradise by Zbynek Brynych
- Silver Sail: HALLELUJAH THE HILLS by Adolfas Mekas, HITLER... CONNAIS PAS by Bertrand Blier, THE LIZARDS by Lina Wertmüller

=== International Jury, short films ===
- Golden Sail, Short Films: L’ABRIVADE by Olivier Gendebien and Jacqueline Grigaut-Lefèvre
- Silver Sail, Short Films: LES BUCHERONS DE LA MANOUANE by Arthur Lamothe
- Mention, Short Films: AUTOMANIA 2000 by John Halas,LES JOJOS by Jean Dasque

=== FIPRESCI Jury ===
- A la majorité: THE LIZARDS by Lina Wertmüller
- Prix, à l’unanimité: TIBURONEROS by Luis Alcoriza
