= Best Actress Award (Locarno International Film Festival) =

Award given to the best actress at the Locarno Film Festival

Leopard for Best Actress
- Awarded for: Best performance by an actress
- Country: Switzerland
- Presented by: Locarno International Film Festival
- First award: 1946
- Final award: 2022
- Currently held by: Daniela Marín Navarro for I Have Electric Dreams

The Leopard for Best Actress (Italian: Pardo per la miglior interpretazione femminile) is an award given at the Locarno International Film Festival. It was first awarded in 1946.

== Award winners ==
Year	Actress	Film
1946	Jennifer Jones	The Song of Bernadette
1947	Jennifer Jones	Cluny Brown
1948	Hildegard Knef	Film Without a Title
1949	Hilde Krahl	Love '47
1950-1957	Not awarded	
1958	Carla Gravina	Love and Chatter
1959	Not awarded	
1960	Jana Brejchová	Higher Principle
1961-1963	Not awarded	
1964	Hideko Takamine	Yearning
1965-1989	Not awarded	
1990	Emer McCourt	Hush-a-Bye Baby
1991-1992	Not awarded	
1993	Valeria Bruni Tedeschi	Normal People Are Nothing Exceptional
1994	Bulle Ogier; Bernadette Lafont; Lio; Michèle Laroque; Maaike Jansen	Personne ne m'aime
1995	Johanna ter Steege	Goodbye
1996	Valeria Bruni Tedeschi	Nénette et Boni
1997	Rona Hartner	The Crazy Stranger
1998	Rossy de Palma	Foul Play
1999	Véra Briole	1999 Madeleine
2000	Sabine Timoteo	L'Amour, l'Argent, l'Amour
2001	Kim Ho-jung	Nabi
2002	Taraneh Alidoosti	I Am Taraneh, I Am Fifteen Years Old
2003	Holly Hunter	Thirteen
2003	Diana Dumbrava	Maria
2003	Kirron Kher	Khamosh Pani
2004	Maria Kwiatkowsky; Pinar Erincin	En Garde
2005	Robin Wright; Amanda Seyfried; Sissy Spacek; Holly Hunter; Lisa Gay Hamilton; Glenn Close; Elpidia Carrillo; Amy Brenneman; Kathy Baker	Nine Lives
2006	Amber Tamblyn	Stephanie Daley
2007	Marian Álvarez	The Best of Me
2008	Ilaria Occhini	Black Sea
2009	Lotte Verbeek	Nothing Personal
2010	Jasna Đuričić	White White World
2011	María Canale	Back to Stay
2012	Nai An	When Night Falls
2013	Brie Larson	Short Term 12
2014	Ariane Labed	Fidelio: Alice's Odyssey
2015	Sachie Tanaka; Hazuki Kikuchi; Maiko Mihara; Rira Kawamura	Happy Hour
2016	Irena Ivanova	Godless
2017	Isabelle Huppert	Madame Hyde
2018	Andra Guti	Alice T.
2019	Vitalina Varela	Vitalina Varela
2021	Anastasiya Krasovskaya	Gerda
2022	Daniela Marín Navarro	I Have Electric Dreams (Tengo sueños eléctricos)
