= Pardo for Best Direction =

Award given to the best directed film at the Locarno Film Festival

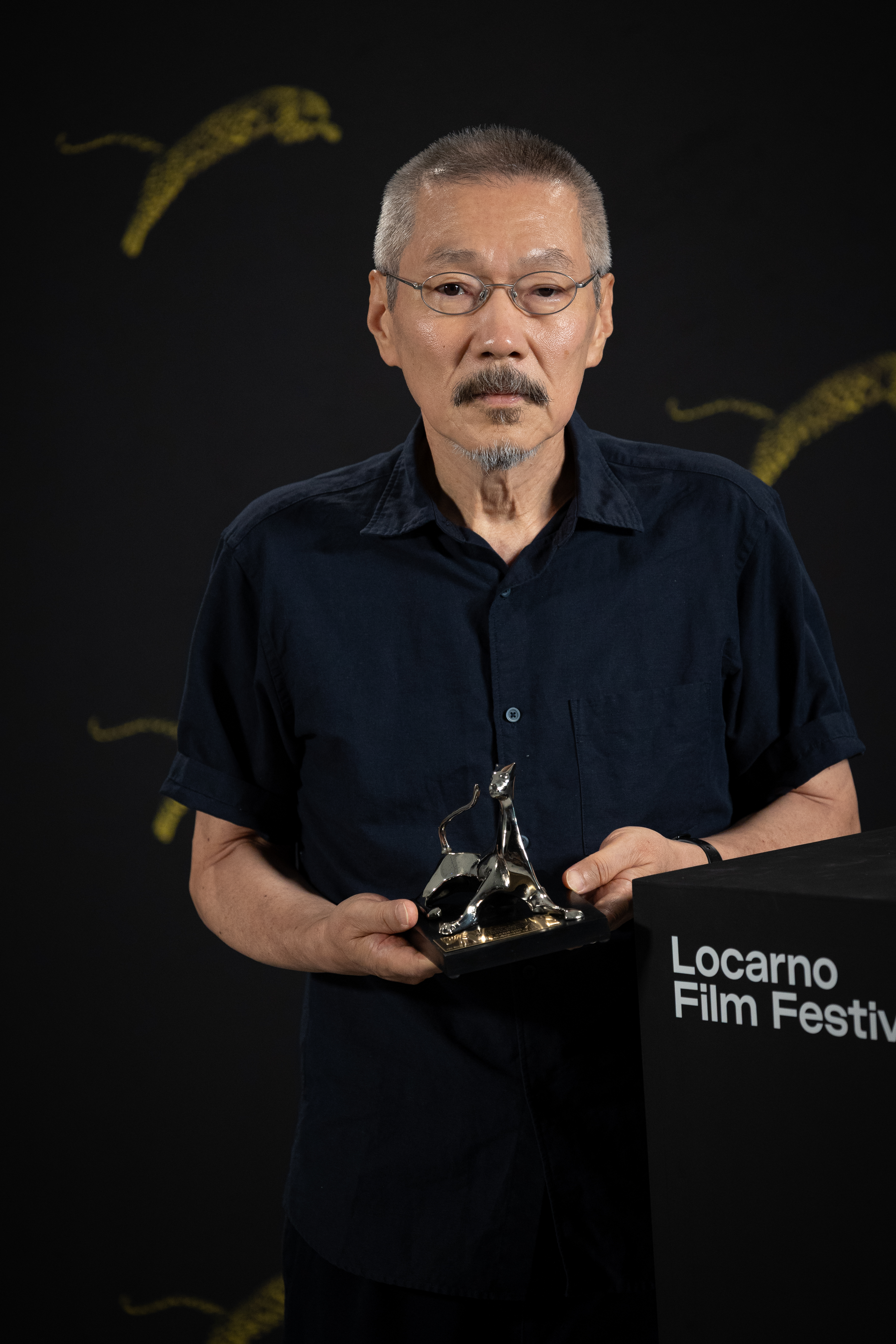
- 2026 recipient: Hong Sang-soo
- Awarded for: Best director
- Country: Switzerland
- Presented by: Locarno International Film Festival
- First award: 1946
- Currently held by: Hong Sang-soo for Nowhere to Lay My Eyes (2026)

The Pardo for Best Direction award is given annually at the Locarno Film Festival to the best director in the Main Competition (Concorso Internazionale).

Among its winners are: René Clair, John Ford, Roberto Rossellini, Hong Sang-soo, Pedro Costa, Andrzej Żuławski, and Abel Ferrara.

== History ==
René Clair was the award first winner for And Then There Were None (1946), at the festival's 1st edition. Clair is also the first filmmaker to won the prize twice. At the 3rd edition, John Ford and Roberto Rossellini shared the prize, for Fort Apache and Germany, Year Zero, respectively.

After a 46-year-long hiatus, the award was reintroduced at the 59th edition, where Laurent Achard won for The Last of the Crazy People (2006). Canadian filmmaker Denis Côté won twice for All That She Wants (2008) and Curling (2010). Polish filmmaker Andrzej Żuławski won for his last feature film Cosmos (2015).

Chilean filmmaker Dominga Sotomayor was the first woman to win the prize, for her drama film Too Late to Die Young (2018). While Iraqi filmmaker Abbas Fahdel won for Tales of the Wounded Land (2025), marking the first documentary to win the prize.

South Korean filmmaker Hong Sang-soo is the most recent two-time winner, following his win for Nowhere to Lay My Eyes (2026).

== Winners ==
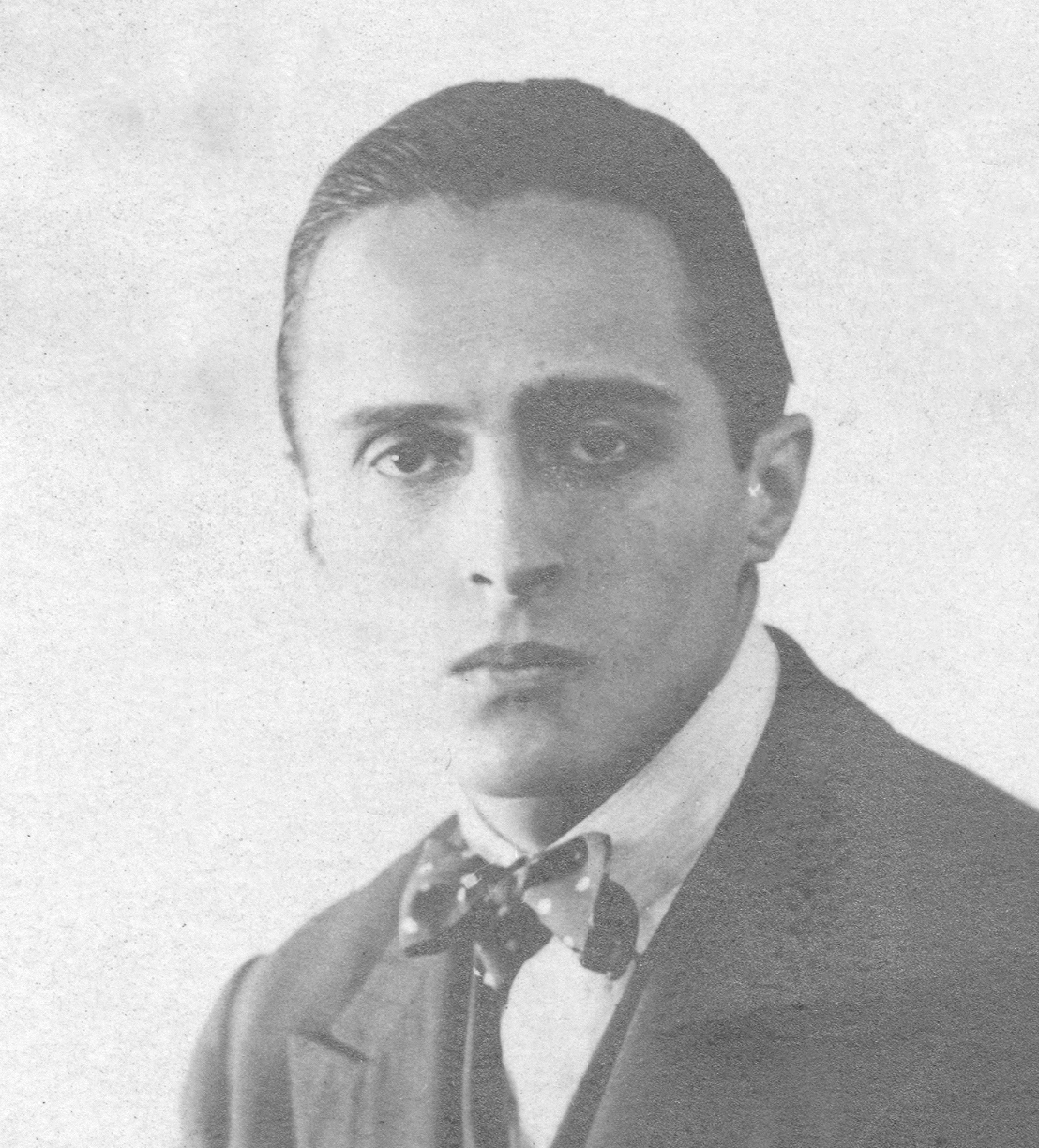
René Clair won twice for And Then There Were None (1946) and Man About Town (1947)

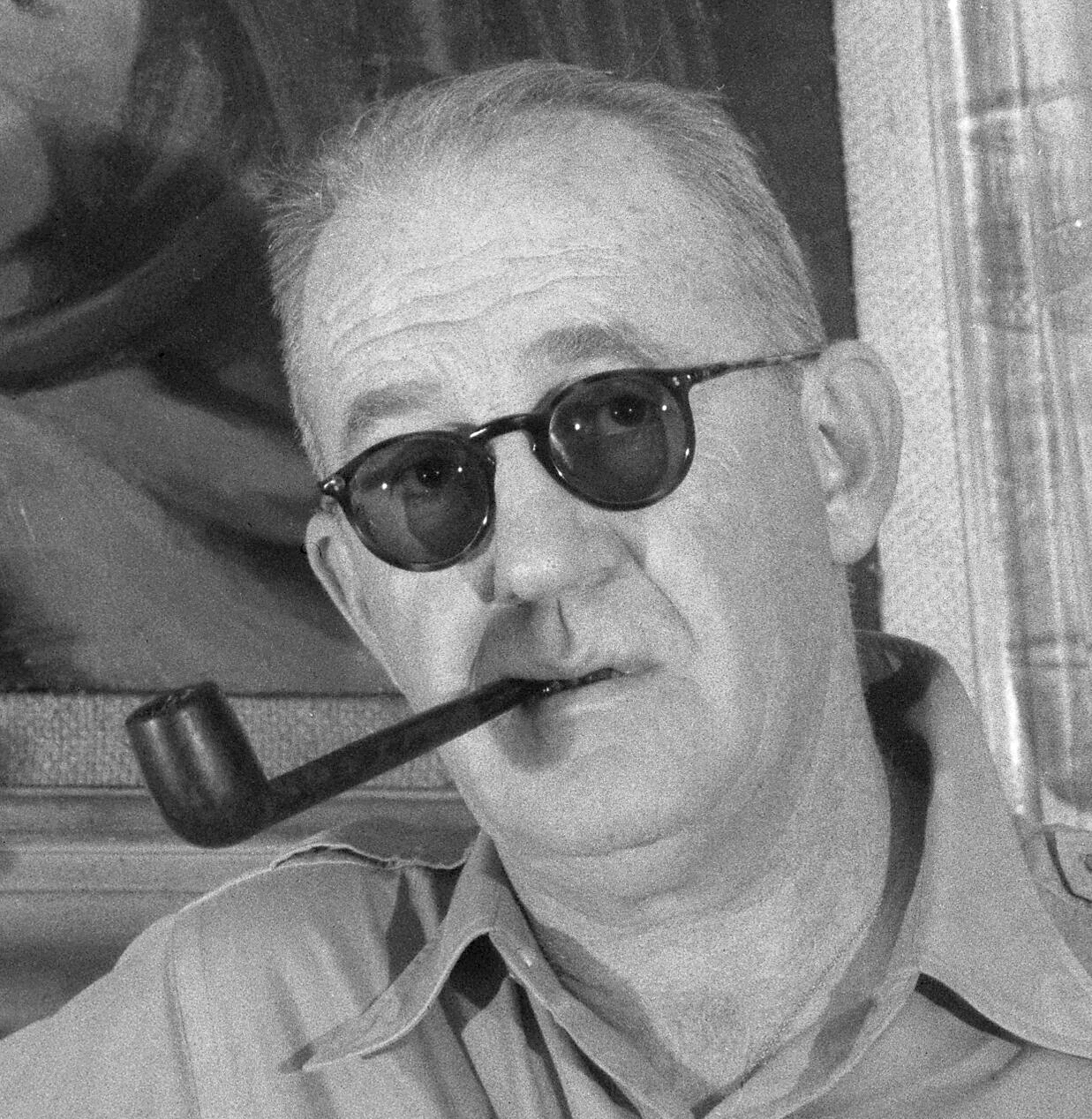
John Ford won for Fort Apache (1948)

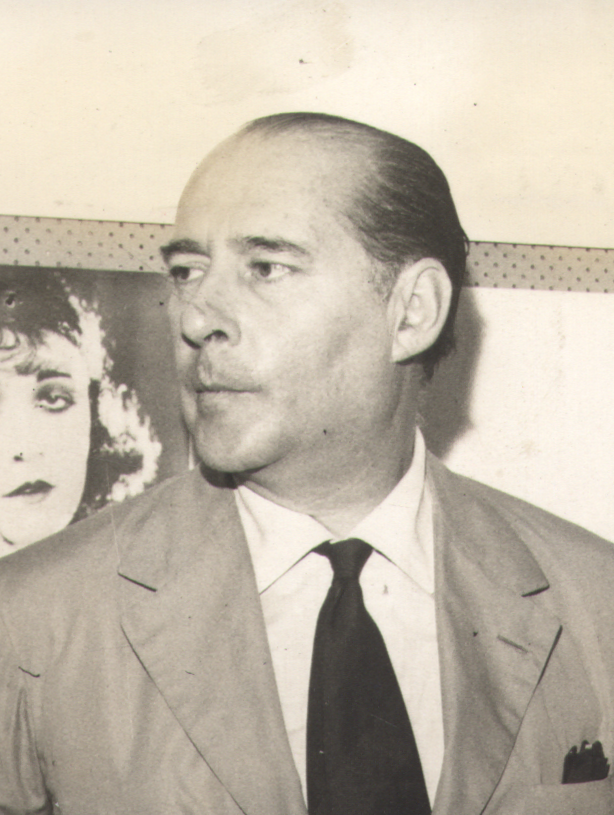
Roberto Rossellini won for Germany, Year Zero (1948)

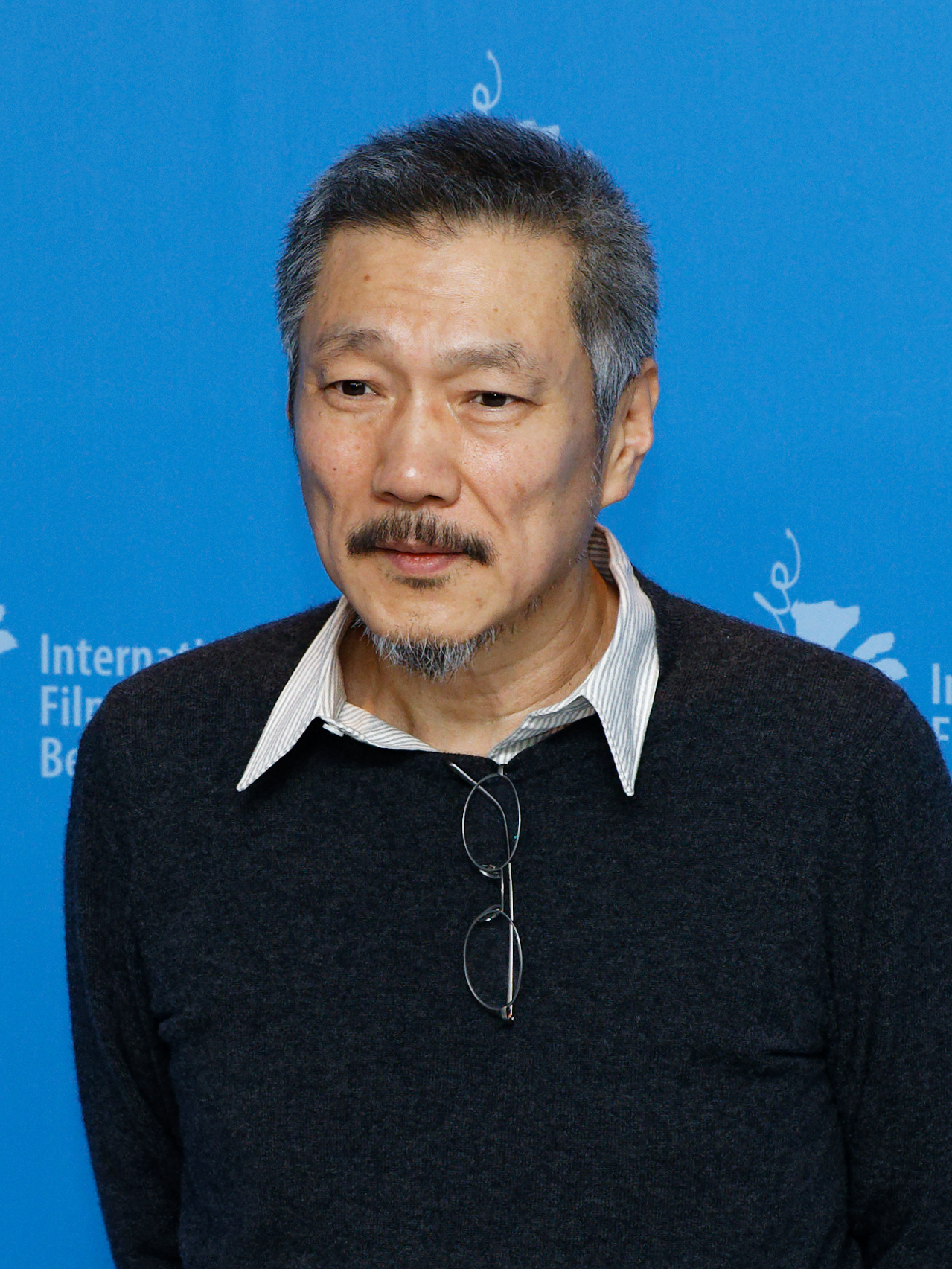
Hong Sang-soo won twice for Our Sunhi (2013) and Nowhere to Lay My Eyes (2026)

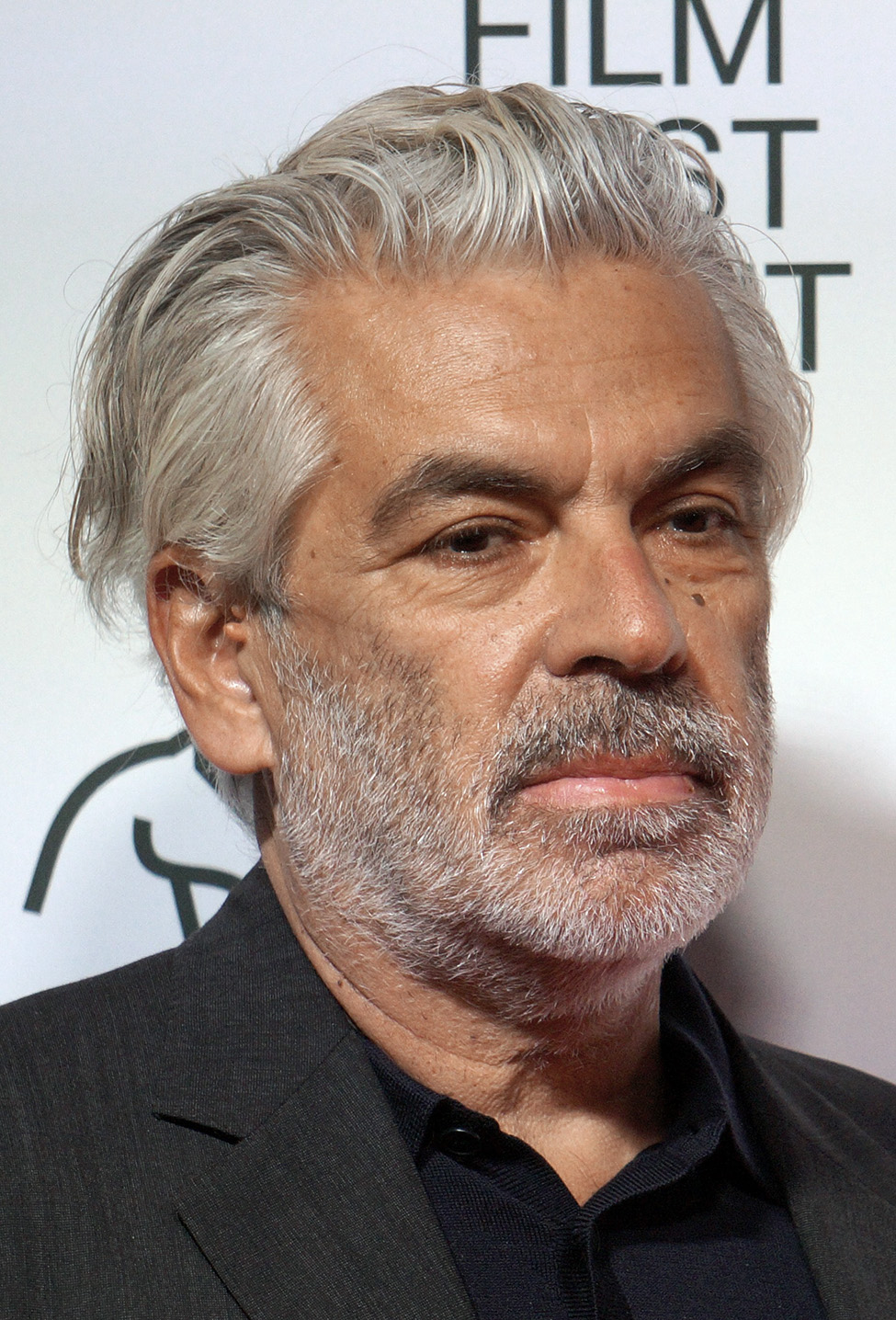
Pedro Costa won for Horse Money (2014)

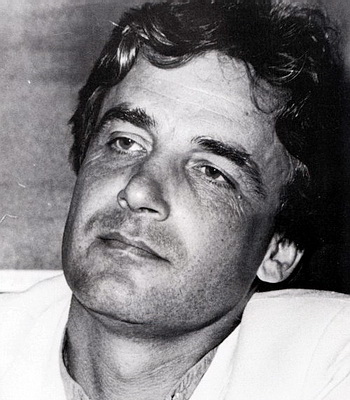
Andrzej Żuławski won for Cosmos (2015)

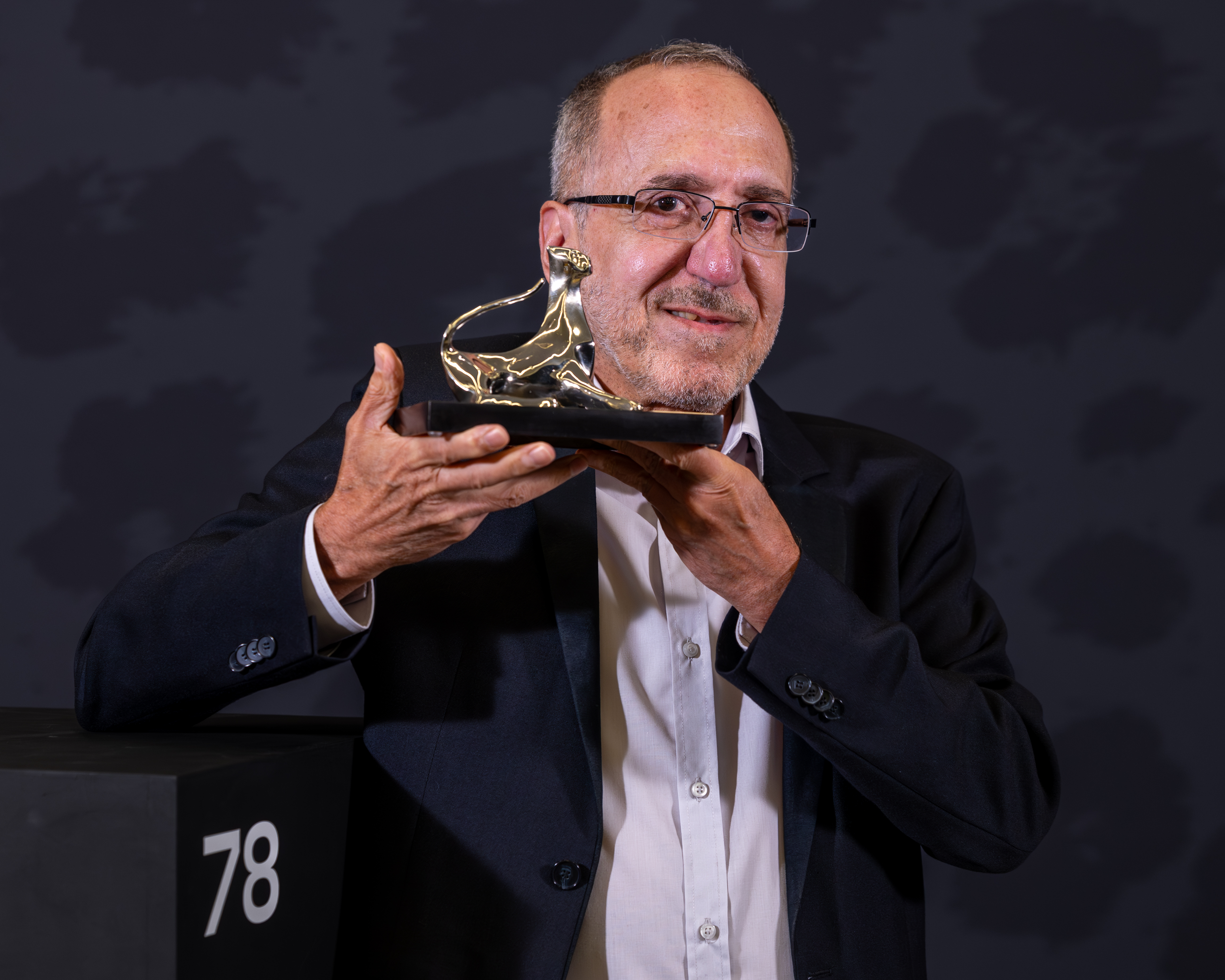
Abbas Fahdel won for Tales of the Wounded Land (2025)

=== 1940s ===
Year	English Title	Original Title	Director(s)
1946	And Then There Were None		René Clair
1947	Man About Town	Le Silence est d'or	René Clair
1948	Fort Apache (1st prize)		John Ford
1948	Germany, Year Zero (2nd prize)	Germania anno zero	Roberto Rossellini
1949 - 1959: No Award Given

=== 1960s ===
Year	English Title	Original Title	Director(s)
1960	Foma Gordeev	Фома Гордеев	Mark Donskoy
1961- 2005: No Award Given

=== 2000s ===
Year	English Title	Original Title	Director(s)
2006	The Last of the Crazy People	Le Dernier des fous	Laurent Achard
2007	Capitaine Achab		Philippe Ramos
2008	All That She Wants	Elle veut le chaos	Denis Côté
2009	Tambourine, Drum	Бубен, барабан	Aleksei Mizgiryov

=== 2010s ===
Year	English Title	Original Title	Director(s)
2010	Curling		Denis Côté
2011	Best Intentions	Din dragoste cu cele mai bune intentii	Adrian Sitaru
2012	When Night Falls	我还有话要说	Ying Liang
2013	Our Sunhi	우리 선희	Hong Sang-soo
2014	Horse Money	Cavalo Dinheiro	Pedro Costa
2015	Cosmos		Andrzej Żuławski
2016	The Ornithologist	O Ornitólogo	João Pedro Rodrigues
2017	9 Fingers	9 Doigts	F. J. Ossang
2018	Too Late to Die Young	Tarde para morir joven	Dominga Sotomayor
2019	Isadora's Children	Les Enfants d'Isadora	Damien Manivel

=== 2020s ===
Year	English Title	Original Title	Director(s)
2021	Zeros and Ones		Abel Ferrara
2022	I Have Electric Dreams	Tengo sueños eléctricos	Valentina Maurel
2023	Stepne		Maryna Vroda
2024	Drowning Dry	Seses	Laurynas Bareiša
2025	Tales of the Wounded Land		Abbas Fahdel
2026	Nowhere to Lay My Eyes	눈둘데가 없네	Hong Sang-soo
