= Valentina Maurel =

Costa Rican-French filmmaker (born 1988)

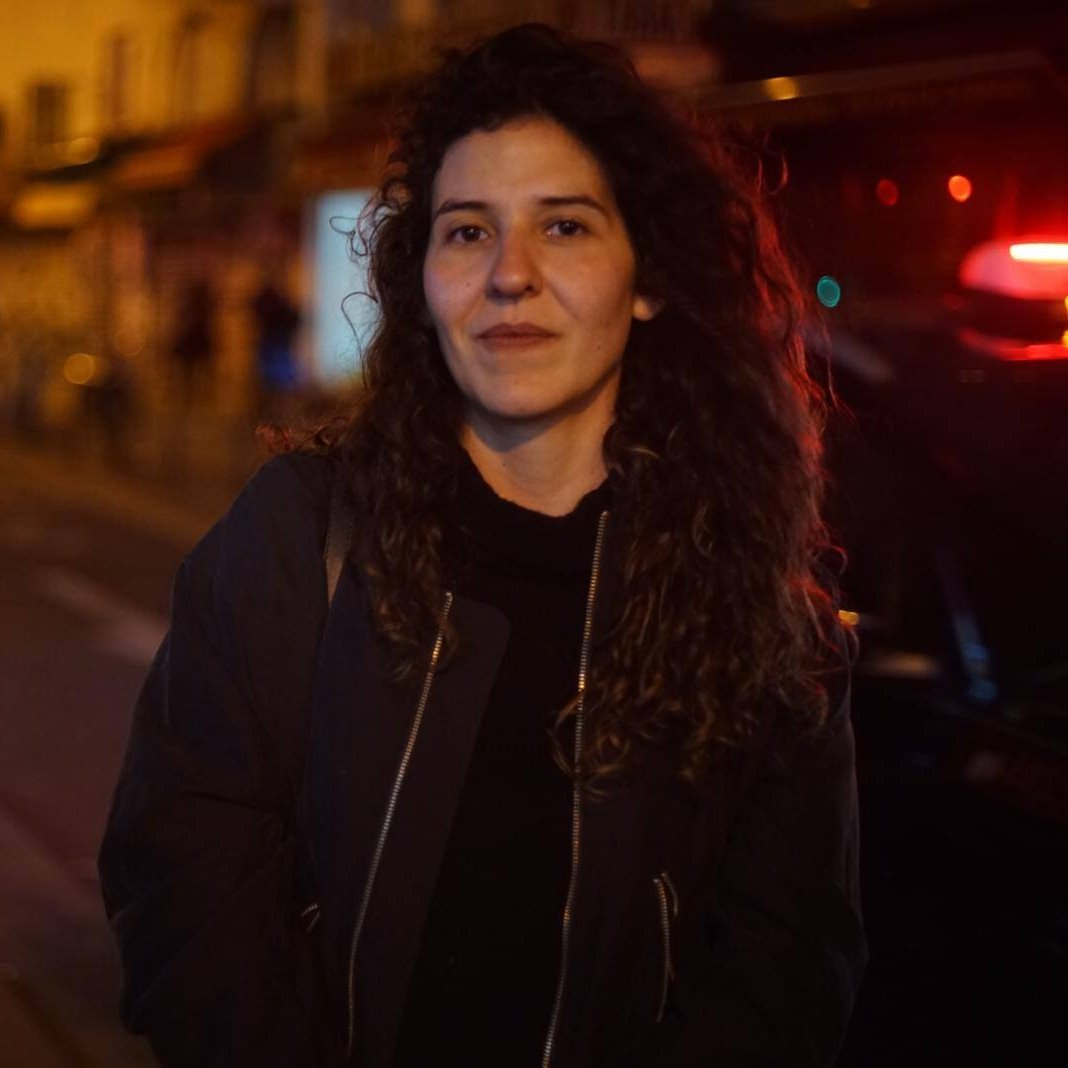
- Maurel in 2019
- Born: Valentina Maurel Soto; 1988 (age 37–38); San José, Costa Rica
- Education: Institut national supérieur des arts du spectacle et des techniques de diffusion
- Occupations: Director; screenwriter
- Years active: 2017–present
- Mother: Ana Istarú

Valentina Maurel Soto (born 1988) is a Costa Rican-French director and screenwriter.

== Early life ==
Maurel was born in San José, Costa Rica, the daughter of Costa Rican poet Ana Istarú and French actor César Maurel. She studied art history at the University of Costa Rica for a year before moving to France at the age of 19. She later studied film at the Institut national supérieur des arts du spectacle et des techniques de diffusion (INSAS) in Brussels.

== Career ==
Maurel's graduation film at INSAS, a short titled Paul Is Here, won the Cinéfondation First Jury Prize at the 2017 Cannes Film Festival. Her debut feature film, I Have Electric Dreams, opened the official competition of Film Fest Gent in 2022. The film went on to win the Best Direction Award at the Locarno Film Festival, the Horizontes Award at the San Sebastián International Film Festival, and the Golden Alexander at the Thessaloniki International Film Festival. In September 2024, she served on the Horizontes jury of the 72nd San Sebastián International Film Festival. Her second feature film, Forever Your Maternal Animal, competed in the Un Certain Regard competition of the 2026 Cannes Film Festival.

== Personal life ==
Maurel is based in Belgium.

== Filmography ==
Year	Title	Director	Writer	Notes	Ref.
2018	Paul Is Here	Yes	Yes	Short film	
2019	Lucia in Limbo	Yes	Yes	Short film	
2022	I Have Electric Dreams	Yes	Yes		
2026	Forever Your Maternal Animal	Yes	Yes		

== Awards and nominations ==
Award	Year	Category	Nominated work	Result	Ref.
Cinéfondation	2017	First Jury Prize	Paul Is Here	Won	
Film Fest Gent	2022	Grand Prix	I Have Electric Dreams	Special mention	
International Film Festival of India	2022	Golden Peacock	I Have Electric Dreams	Won	
Locarno Film Festival	2022	Golden Leopard	I Have Electric Dreams	Nominated	
Locarno Film Festival	2022	Best Direction Award	I Have Electric Dreams	Won	
Luxembourg City Film Festival	2023	Grand Prix	I Have Electric Dreams	Won	
Magritte Award	2020	Best Fiction Short Film	Lucia in Limbo	Nominated	
San Sebastián International Film Festival	2022	Horizontes Award	I Have Electric Dreams	Won	
Thessaloniki International Film Festival	2022	Golden Alexander	I Have Electric Dreams	Won	
