= 3rd Locarno Film Festival =

Film festival in Locarno, Switzerland

- Location: Locarno, Switzerland
- Founded: 1946
- Hosted by: Por Locarno
- Festival date: Opening: July 1948; Closing: July 1948
- Website: Locarno Film Festival

Locarno Film Festival
- 4th 2nd

The 3rd Locarno Film Festival was held in July, 1948 in Locarno, Switzerland. No official prizes were awarded at the festival this year. The festival was noted for using new projection technology with arc lamps to screen Technicolor films at the 2,000 seat out-door theater at the Locarno Grand Hotel.

== Screenings ==
The following films screened in these sections at the 3rd Locarno Film Festival.

=== Programme principal ===
| English Title | Original Title | Director(s) | Year | Production Country |
|---|---|---|---|---|
| | Anni, Eine Wiener Ballade | Max Neufeld | 1948 | Austria |
| Be Seeing You, Father | Arrivederci, Papà! | Camillo Mastrocinque | 1948 | Italy |
| Captain From Castile | | Henry King | 1947 | USA |
| Fight Without Hate | Combat Sans Haine | André Michel | | Switzerland |
| How I Lost the War | Come Persi La Guerra | Carlo Borghesio | 1947 | Italy |
| Heart and Soul | Cuore | Duilio Coletti | 1948 | Italy |
| Fort Apache | | John Ford | 1948 | USA |
| Germany Year Zero | Germania Anno Zero | Roberto Rossellini | 1948 | Italy |
| Lost Youth | Gioventù Perduta | Pietro Germi | 1947 | Italy |
| God's Angels Are Everywhere | Gottes Engel Sind Überall | Hans Thimig | 1948 | Austria |
| I Have Always Loved You | | Frank Borzage | 1946 | USA |
| It Always Rains On Sunday | | Robert Hamer | 1947 | Great Britain |
| It Had To Be You | | Rudolph Maté | 1947 | USA |
| The Wandering Jew | L'Ebreo Errante | Goffredo Alessandrini | 1948 | Italy |
| The Charterhouse of Parma | La Chartreuse De Parme | Christian-Jacque | 1948 | France |
| | La Grande Maguet | Roger Richebe | 1947 | France |
| | La Traviata | Carmine Gallone | | Italy |
| The Loves of Colette | La Vie En Rose | Jean Faurez | 1947 | France |
| Convicted | Les Condamnes | Georges Lacombe | 1948 | France |
| Hey Boy | Proibito Rubare | Luigi Comencini | 1948 | Italy |
| Sleep My Love | | Douglas Sirk | 1948 | USA |
| The Unconquered | | Cecil B. DeMille | 1947 | USA |
| The Unfinished Dance | | Henry Koster | 1947 | USA |
| The Voice Of The Turtle | | Irving Rapper | 1947 | USA |
| Spring | Vesna | Grigori Alexandrov | 1947 | Russia |

=== Special Sections / Private Visions ===
Sections spéciales / Visions privées

| English Title | Original Title | Director(s) | Year | Production Country |
|---|---|---|---|---|
| A Walk In The Sun | | Lewis Milestone | 1945 | USA |
| Blanche Fury | | Marc Allégret | 1948 | Great Britain |
| Film Without a Name | Film Ohne Titel | Rudolf Jugert, Helmuth Käutner | 1948 | Germany |
| The Execrable Fate of Guillemette Babin | Guillemette Babin | Guillaume Radot | 1948 | France |
| Kiss Of Death | | Henry Hathaway | 1947 | USA |
| Miranda | | Ken Annakin | 1948 | Great Britain |
| The Last Stage | Ostatni Etap | Wanda Jakubowska | 1948 | Poland |
| Presentiment | Predtucha | Otakar Vavra | 1947 | Czech Republic |
| Sitting Pretty | | Walter Lang | 1948 | USA |
| Miracle on 34th Street | | George Seaton | 1947 | USA |
| The October Man | | Roy Baker | 1947 | Great Britain |
| It Happened in Europe | Valahol Europaban | Géza Radvànyi | 1947 | Hungary |

=== Swiss Documentary Film Review ===
Revue du film documentaire Suisse

| English Title | Original Title | Director(s) | Year | Production Country |
|---|---|---|---|---|
| | A L'Assaut Du Ciel | | | Switzerland |
| | Enfants De Montagne | Otto Ritter | | Switzerland |
| | Les Soldats Etrangers En Suisse | | | Switzerland |
| | Murmures De La Foret Et | | | Switzerland |
| | Nains Etranges | | | Switzerland |
| | Reiseziel Aegypten | Victor Staub | | Switzerland |
| | Unvergessliche Melodie | | | Switzerland |

=== Documentary Film Review / Youth and Reconstruction ===
Revue du film documentaire / Jeunesse et reconstruction

| English Title | Original Title | Director(s) | Year | Production Country |
|---|---|---|---|---|
| Tomorrow's a Wonderful Day | Adamah | Helmar Lerski | 1947 | Israel |
| | Aubervilliers | Elie Lotar | 1946 | France |
| Bush Christmas | | Ralph Keene | 1947 | Great Britain |
| | C'Est L'Aviron | Norman McLaren | 1944 | Canada |
| Calling Indonesia | | Joris Ivens Ivens | 1945 | Australia |
| Fiddle-De-Dee | | Norman McLaren | 1947 | Canada |
| | I Romantici A Venezia | Luciano Emmer, Enrico Gras | 1948 | Italy |
| Journey Into Medicine | | Willard van Dyke | 1947 | USA |
| | La Provincia Dei Sette Laghi | Gigi Martello | 1948 | Italy |
| | La-Haut Sur La Montagne | Norman McLaren | 1946 | Canada |
| | Le Bâton | Marcel Gibaut | 1946 | France |
| | Lumei | Francesco Pasinetti | | Italy |
| | Mapple Sugar | | 1941 | Canada |
| | Nous Construisons Les Ruines | Emmanuel Kanera | | Czech Republic |
| Temptation of Mr. Prokouk | Pan Prokouk V Pokuseni | Karel Zeman | | Poland |
| School In The Mailbox | | Stanley Hawes | 1947 | Australia |
| | Wroclaw, Ville Universitaire | Jerzy Bossak | | Poland |

=== Documentary Film Review / Special Program under the patronage of UNESCO ===
Revue du film documentaire / Programme spécial sous le patronage de l'Unesco

| English Title | Original Title | Director(s) | Year | Production Country |
|---|---|---|---|---|
| Hungry Minds | Les Esprits Assoiffes | Tom Daly | 1948 | Canada |
| The People's Charter | | | 1947 | USA |
| The World Is Rich | | Paul Rotha | | Great Britain |

=== Documentary Film Review (Revue du film documentaire) ===
| English Title | Original Title | Director(s) | Year | Production Country |
|---|---|---|---|---|
| Television Is Here Again | | P.H. Dorte | | Great Britain |

== Awards ==
=== Swiss Cinema Magazine Jury (Cine Suisse Magacine Jury) ===
- Great Prize: GERMANY, YEAR ZERO by Roberto Rossellini
- Best Scenario Prize: GERMANY, YEAR ZERO by Roberto Rossellini, LA VIE EN ROSE by Jean Faurez
- Best Arrangement Prize: THE MIRACLE OF 34TH STREET by George Seaton, KISS OF DEATH by Henry Hathaway
- Best Short Film Prize: RAPE OF THE EARTH
- Best Black and White Photo Prize: LA CHARTREUSE DE PARME by Christian-Jacque,FORT APACHE by John Ford
- Best Color Photo Prize: BLANCHE FURY by Marc Allégret,THE UNFINISHED DANCE by Henry Koster
- Best Director – First Prize: John Ford for FORT APACHE
- Best Director – Second Prize: Roberto Rossellini for GERMANIA ANNO ZERO
- Best Actress: Hildegard Knef in FILM WITHOUT A TITLE
- Best Actor: Victore Mature in KISS OF DEATH
- Best Actor – Second Prize: Gérard Philipe in LA CHARTREUSE DE PARME
