= 1st Locarno Film Festival =

Film festival in Locarno, Switzerland

- Opening film: O sole mio by Giacomo Gentilomo
- Location: Locarno, Switzerland
- Founded: 1946
- Hosted by: Pro Locarno
- Festival date: Opening: 23 August 1946; Closing: 2 September 1946
- Website: Locarno Film Festival

Locarno Film Festival
- 2nd None

The 1st Locarno Film Festival was held from 23 August til 2 September 1946 at the Grand Hotel in Locarno, Switzerland. The opening film was My Sun (O sole mio) by Giacomo Gentilomo.

The festival was founded by Beretta Bolla, Riccardo Bolla, film critic Vinicio Beretta, Locarno theater owner André Mondini, and Giuseppe Padlin of the distribution house Sefi Film.

== Official Sections ==
The following films received screenings in the sections below:

=== Special Sections / Private Visions ===
Highlighted title indicates winner

English title	Original title	Director(s)	Production Country
And Then There Were None		René Clair	United States
Hangover Square		John Brahm	United States
His Young Wife	Le miserie del Signor Travet	Mario Soldati	Italy
The Hour of Truth	La hora de la verdad	Norman Foster	Mexico
The House on 92nd Street		Henry Hathaway	United States
Inês de Castro (1944)		José Leitao de Barros	Portugal, Spain
The Ox-Bow Incident (1943)		William A. Wellman	United States
"Pimpernel" Smith (1941)	Mister V	Leslie Howard	United Kingdom
Strange Fate	Étrange destin	Louis Cuny	France
Under the Bridges	Unter den Brücken	Helmut Käutner	Germany

=== Principal Program ===
Highlighted title indicates winner & indicates screenplay winner

English title	Original Ttile	Director(s)	Production Country
Bathing Beauty		Georges Sidney	United States
Biraghin		Carmine Gallone	Italy
Dead of Night		Alberto Cavalcanti, Charles Crichton, Basil Dearden and Robert Hamer	United Kingdom
The Dolly Sisters		Irving Cummings	United States
Double Indemnity		Billy Wilder	United States
Interlude	I Dodens Vantrum	Hasse Elkman	Sweden
Ivan the Terrible	Иван Грозный	Sergei Eisenstein	Soviet Union
The Keys Of The Kingdom		John M. Stahl	United States
Life Begins Anew	La Vita Ricomincia	Mario Mattoli	Italy
My Sun	O sole mio	Giacomo Gentilomo	Italy
Blind Desire	La Part De L'Ombre	Jean Delannoy	France
Rome Open City	Roma Città Aperta	Roberto Rossellini	Italy
The Song of Bernardette		Henry King	United States
The Temptation of Barbizon	La Tentation De Barbizon	Jean Stelli	France
Tonight And Every Night		Victor Saville	United States

=== Documentary Films (Revue du film documentaire) ===
Title	Director(s)	Production Country
A Defeated People	Humphrey Jennings	United Kingdom
Bau Des Kraftwerkes Rupperswil-Auenstein	Valerian Schmidely	Switzerland
Die Gewerkschaften		Switzerland
Faim	Rudy Hornacker	Netherlands
Kinder In Not	A. Forter	Switzerland
La Feerie Des Automates	Victor Borel	Switzerland
La Lapponie	Arne Sucksdorff	Sweden
La Parade Sportive A Moscou	Vladimir Beljaew, Wenjer	Soviet Union
Naissance Du Cinema	Roger Leenhardt	France
Steel	Ronald Riley	United Kingdom
Tennessee Valley Authority	Slavko Vorkapich	United States
Typical Pictures Of Swiss Life	Valerian Schmidely	Switzerland
Vinden Fran Väster	Arne Sucksdorff	Sweden

== Official Awards ==
- Best Film: And Then There Were None by René Clair
- Prize for the most interesting Screenplay: Dead of Night by Alberto Cavalcanti, Basil Dearden
- Best Photo Prize: Ivan the Terrible by Serguei Eisenstein
- Best Actor: Laird Cregar in Hangover Square
- Best Director: René Clair
- Best Actress: Jennifer Jones in The Song of Bernadette
- Funniest film prize: "Pimpernel" Smith by Leslie Howard
