= I Have Electric Dreams =

2022 film by Valentina Maurel

- Costa Rican promotional poster
- Spanish: Tengo sueños eléctricos
- Directed by: Valentina Maurel
- Written by: Valentina Maurel
- Produced by: Benoit Roland; Grégoire Debailly
- Starring: Reinaldo Amien Gutiérrez; Daniela Marín Navarro; Vivian Rodriguez; Adriana Castro García; Jose Pablo Segreda Johanning
- Cinematography: Nicolás Wong Díaz
- Edited by: Bertrand Conard
- Production companies: Wrong Men; Geko Films
- Distributed by: Cinéart
- Release date: 8 August 2022 (Locarno)
- Running time: 101 minutes
- Countries: Costa Rica; Belgium; France
- Language: Spanish

I Have Electric Dreams (Spanish: Tengo sueños eléctricos) is a 2022 coming-of-age drama film written and directed by Valentina Maurel. A co-production of Costa Rica, Belgium and France, it follows the young Eva (Daniela Marín Navarro), who lives with her mother, her little sister and their cat, in a thin line between love and hate, in a world where aggression and rage intertwined with the vertigo of female sexual awakening.

The film had its world premiere at the main competition of the 75th Locarno Film Festival on 8 August 2022, where it won the Pardo for Best Direction, Pardo for Best Actress and Pardo for Best Actor. It was also selected as the Costa Rican entry for the Best International Feature Film at the 96th Academy Awards, but was not nominated.

== Cast ==
- Reinaldo Amien Gutiérrez as Martín
- Daniela Marín Navarro as Eva
- Vivian Rodriguez as Anca
- Adriana Castro García as Sol
- Sarah Lefèvre
- José Pablo Segreda Johanning

== Release ==
It premiered at the 75th Locarno Film Festival on 8 August 2022, where it won the Pardo for Best Direction, Pardo for Best Actress and Pardo for Best Actor. In September 2022, It made to 'Latin Horizons (Horizontes Latinos)' section of 70th San Sebastián International Film Festival, where it won Horizontes Award. It also made it to 'World Cinema' section of 27th Busan International Film Festival and was screened on 6 October 2022. In November 2022, it was featured in 'International Competition' section of 53rd International Film Festival of India, where it won Golden Peacock for Best Film and Best Actress Award. In December it was invited to the 28th Kolkata International Film Festival and was screened on 17 December 2022. It was also invited to the 27th Lima Film Festival in the Competition fiction section, where it was screened on 11 August 2023.

== Reception ==
On the review aggregator Rotten Tomatoes website, the film has an approval rating of 100% based on 8 reviews, with an average rating of 8/10.

Guy Lodge of Variety wrote "an auspicious debut feature from Costa Rican writer-director Valentina Maurel". It has been reviewed by Neil Young of Screen Daily, who wrote of "the tough, sensual, spiky feature-length debut by Costa Rican writer-director Valentina Maurel".

== Sequel ==
In November 2022, Maurel announced that she was writing a sequel, which would focus on the mother-daughter relationship between Eva and Anca. She noted that the follow-up would include "complex characters and maybe a little bit of a raw take on relationships between women."

== Accolades ==
Year	Award	Category	Recipient(s)	Result	Ref.
Locarno Film Festival	13 August 2022	Golden Leopard	Valentina Maurel	Nominated	
Locarno Film Festival	13 August 2022	Best Direction Award	Valentina Maurel	Won	
Locarno Film Festival	13 August 2022	Best Actor Award	Reinaldo Amien Gutiérrez	Won	
Locarno Film Festival	13 August 2022	Best Actress Award	Daniela Marín Navarro	Won	
Sarajevo Film Festival	19 August 2022	Special Award for the Promotion of Gender Equality	I Have Electric Dreams	Nominated	
San Sebastián International Film Festival	24 September 2022	Horizontes Award	I Have Electric Dreams	Won	
Film Fest Ghent	22 October 2022	Best Film	I Have Electric Dreams	Nominated	
Mar del Plata International Film Festival	13 November 2022	Best Latin-American Film	I Have Electric Dreams	Nominated	
Mar del Plata International Film Festival	13 November 2022	FIPRESCI Prize	I Have Electric Dreams	Won	
Mar del Plata International Film Festival	13 November 2022	FEISAL Award	I Have Electric Dreams	Won	
International Film Festival of India	28 November 2022	Golden Peacock (Best Film)	I Have Electric Dreams	Won	
International Film Festival of India	28 November 2022	IFFI Best Actor Award (Female)	Daniela Marín Navarro	Won	
Palm Springs International Film Festival	16 January 2023	Best Ibero-American Film	I Have Electric Dreams	Nominated	
Cleveland International Film Festival	1 April 2023	New Direction Award	I Have Electric Dreams	Nominated	
Guadalajara International Film Festival	9 June 2023	Iberoamerican Competition – Best Film	I Have Electric Dreams	Won	
Lima Film Festival	18 August 2023	Best Film	I Have Electric Dreams	Nominated	
Lima Film Festival	18 August 2023	Best Debut	I Have Electric Dreams	Won	
Lima Film Festival	18 August 2023	ECRAN Award for Best Direction of Debut or Second Feature Film in the Fiction Competition	Valentina Maurel	Won	
Lima Film Festival	18 August 2023	NUNA Award for Best Latin American Female Director in Competition	Valentina Maurel	Won	
Magritte Award	9 March 2024	Best Editing	Bertrand Conard	Nominated	
Platino Awards	20 April 2024	Best First Feature Film	I Have Electric Dreams	Pending	

== See also ==
- List of Costa Rican submissions for the Academy Award for Best International Feature Film
