= 2nd Locarno Film Festival =

Film festival in Locarno, Switzerland

- Location: Locarno, Switzerland
- Founded: 1946
- Festival date: Opening: 26 June 1947; Closing: 9 July 1947
- Website: Locarno Film Festival

Locarno Film Festival
- 3rd 1st

The 2nd Locarno Film Festival was held from 26 June to 9 July 1947. The best picture winner was Man About Town directed by René Clair. The film Cluny Brown also won praise, with Jennifer Jones winning best actress.

Linda Darnell was one of the few celebrities who had appearance at the festival to promote her film My Darling Clementine (1946).

The Soviet Union failed to submit a film to the festival. However, midway through the festival a representative from the Kremlin film industry showed up and demanded Admiral Nakhimov be screened, which it ultimately was.

== Screenings ==
The following films screened in these sections at 2nd Locarno Film Festival

=== Soirées de Gala Nocturne (Gala Evenings) ===
| English Title | Original Title | Director(s) | Year | Production Country |
|---|---|---|---|---|
| 13 Rue Madeleine | 13, Rue Madeleine | Henry Hathaway | 1947 | USA |
| Admiral Nakhimov | | Vsevolod Poudovkine | 1946 | Russia |
| The Singing House | Das Singende Haus | Franz Antel | 1947 | Austria |
| In Those Days | In Jenen Tagen | Helmuth Käutner | 1947 | Germany |
| The Stone Flower | Kamenni Tsvetok | Aleksandr Ptouchko | 1946 | Russia |

=== Programme principal ===
Highlighted title indicates winner

| English Title | Original Title | Director(s) | Year | Production Country |
|---|---|---|---|---|
| A Stolen Life | | Curtis Bernhardt | 1946 | USA |
| | Daniele Cortis | Mario Soldati | 1947 | Italy |
| The Nail | El Clavo | Rafael Gil | 1944 | Spain |
| Bohemian Rapture | Housle A Sen | Václav Krška | 1947 | Czech Republic |
| Man About Town | Le Silence Est D'Or | René Clair | 1947 | France |
| My Darling Clementine | | John Ford | 1946 | USA |
| Not Guilty | Non Coupable | Henri Decoin | 1947 | France |
| Paisan | Paisà | Roberto Rossellini | 1946 | Italy |
| | Preludio D'Amore | Giovanni Paolucci | 1946 | Italy |
| | San Francisco De Asis | Alberto Gout | 1943 | Mexico |
| Shoeshine | Sciuscià | Vittorio De Sica | 1946 | Italy |
| | Sonata A Kreutzer | Mario Soffici | | Argentina |
| Song of Scheherazade | | Walter Reisch | 1947 | USA |
| The Bandit of Sherwood Forest | | George Sherman | 1946 | USA |
| Lady in the Lake | | Robert Montgomery (actor) | 1947 | USA |
| The Razor's Edge | | Edmund Goulding | 1946 | USA |
| To Live in Peace | Vivere In Pace | Luigi Zampa | 1947 | Italy |
| Wanted For Murder | | Lawrence Huntington | 1946 | Great Britain |
| | Wiener Melodien | Theo Lingen, Hubert Marischka | 1947 | Austria |

=== Special Sections / Private Visions ===
| English Title | Original Title | Director(s) | Year | Production Country |
|---|---|---|---|---|
| | Albéniz | Luis César Amadori | | Argentina |
| Cluny Brown | | Ernst Lubitsch | 1946 | USA |
| | Copie Conforme | Jean Dréville | 1947 | France |
| The Dark Corner | | Henry Hathaway | 1946 | USA |
| The Prince of the Desert | El Principe Del Desierto | Fernando A. Rivero | 1947 | Mexico |
| The Sun Still Rises | Il Sole Sorge Ancora | Aldo Vergano | 1946 | Italy |
| Naughty Martine | L'Eventail | Emil-Edwin Reinert | 1947 | France |
| March Of Time | Séléction | Paul Terry | 1946 | USA |
| María Candelaria | | Emilio Fernandez | 1943 | Mexico |
| The Guilt of Janet Ames | | Henry Levin (director) | 1947 | USA |
| Woman To Woman | | Maclean Rogers | 1946 | Great Britain |

=== Educational and Scientific French Films ===
Films pédagogiques et scientifiques français

| Title | Director(s) | Year | Production Country |
|---|---|---|---|
| Amibes Et Greffe De Noyau D'Amibes | Dr. Comandon | | France |
| Etudes Cinematographiques Du Soleil | Bernard Lyot | | France |
| Familles De Droites, Familles De Paraboles | Marc Cantagrel | | France |
| Idee D'Une Carte | Jean Brérault | | France |
| La Mouche | Dr. Pierre Thévenard | | France |
| La Varlope La Comedie Avant Moliere | Jean Tedesco | | France |

=== Cinema in the Service of Peace (Unesco) ===
Le cinéma au service de la paix (Unesco)

| Title | Director(s) | Year | Production Country |
|---|---|---|---|
| Assassins D'Eau Douce | Jean Painlevé | | France |
| Election Of The Parliament | Henning Jensen | 1945 | Denmark |
| Gas Under The Earth's Surface | Christensen | 1942 | Denmark |
| Intravenöse Narkose Bei Bauchhöhlen-Operation | N. Schaenker | 1947 | Switzerland |
| The Corn Is In Danger | Hesselbach | 1945 | Denmark |
| Transfusion Mit Plazentarblut | N. Schaenker | | Switzerland |
| Un Pays Recommence | adap. Bela Balasz | | Hungary |
| We Chat Traffic | Skot-Hansen | 1942 | Denmark |
| Äussere Wendung Einer Querlage | N. Schaenker | 1947 | Switzerland |

=== Revue du film documentaire: Reconstruction ===
| Title | Director(s) | Year | Production Country |
|---|---|---|---|
| Au Service De La France | Raymond Bernard | | France |
| Calore Solare In Gocce | | | Czech Republic |
| Children On Trial | Jack Lee | | Great Britain |
| Ghetto De Prague | | | Czech Republic |
| Housing In Chile | T. Cobb | | USA |
| Inondation En Pologne | | | Poland |
| La Ferrovia Dei Bambini Russi | Robert Cart | | USA |
| La Svizzera Lavorando In Pace | | | Switzerland |
| Listen To Britain | Humphrey Jennings | | Great Britain |
| Mladina Gradi | France Štiglic | | Yugoslavia |
| Moedrehjaelpen | Carl Theodor Dreyer | 1942 | Denmark |
| Rehabilitation, Voyage To Recovery | | 1945 | USA |
| They Live Again | | | |
| Violazione Di Un Paese | | 1941 | Netherlands |

== Official Awards ==
- Best Film: Man About Town (LE SILENCE EST D’OR) by René Clair
- Best Filmmaker Prize: René Clair for the film LE SILENCE EST D’OR
- Best Scenario Prize: TO LIVE IN PEACE by Luigi Zampa
- Best Short Film Prize: PALAZZO DEI DOGI by Francesco Pasinetti
- Best Photo Prize: ADMIRAL NAKHIMOV by Vsevolod Poudovkine, MARIA CANDELARIA by Emilio Fernandez
- Best Role of Composition Prize: CLUNY BROWN by Ernst Lubitsch, Richard Haydn, René Clair, Anne Baxter, THE RAZOR’S EDGE by Edmund Goulding
- Best Main Role Prize: Jennifer Jones in CLUNY BROWN, René Clair in LE SILENCE EST D’OR
