= Man About Town (1947 film) =

1947 film by René Clair

- French theatrical release poster
- French: Le silence est d'or
- Directed by: René Clair
- Written by: René Clair
- Produced by: René Clair
- Starring: Maurice Chevalier; François Périer; Marcelle Derrien; Dany Robin; Raymond Cordy; Bernard La Jarrige; Paul Ollivier
- Cinematography: Alain Douarinou; Armand Thirard
- Edited by: Louisette Hautecoeur; Henri Taverna
- Music by: Georges Van Parys
- Production companies: Pathé; RKO
- Distributed by: Pathé (France); RKO (United States)
- Release dates: 21 May 1947 (Paris); 21 October 1947 (New York City)
- Running time: 106 minutes
- Countries: France; United States
- Language: French

Man About Town (French: Le silence est d'or, lit. 'Silence is golden') is a 1947 romantic comedy film written and directed by René Clair. It was released in a shortened version in the United States as Man About Town. The film marked Clair's return to working in France after 12 years abroad in the United Kingdom and the United States.

== Premise ==
The setting is Paris in the early 1900s ("1906, perhaps") and much of the action takes place in a silent film studio. Émile, a director, advises his shy young employee Jacques to adopt his own carefree attitude towards women ("one lost, ten found"). Émile takes under his wing Madeleine, the daughter of his old friend Célestin, when she arrives from the country; he offers her a place to stay and a job at his studio, and he starts to fall in love with her. When Jacques returns from military service, he and Madeleine are drawn to each other but they feel guilty about betraying the fatherly Émile. Émile finally realises the truth and decides that he must not stand in the young couple's way.

== Cast ==
- Maurice Chevalier as Émile Clément, known as M. Émile
- François Périer as Jacques
- Marcelle Derrien as Madeleine
- Dany Robin as Lucette
- Robert Pizani as M. Duperrier
- Raymond Cordy as Le Frisé
- Paul Ollivier as the accountant
- Roland Armontel as Célestin
- Gaston Modot as Gustave
- Bernard La Jarrige as Paulo

== Production ==
After 12 years of working in the United Kingdom and then in the United States during World War II, René Clair returned to France in 1946 having signed a contract with RKO to produce his next film there. Other funding for the film came from Pathé. Filming took place at the Joinville Studios in Paris.

Clair chose as the background for his story the very early days of silent film-making. In his introduction to the published screenplay he wrote, "Without doubt some memories of youth have given birth to the comedy that follows. The action of this film takes place during the heroic period of French cinema. The advent of this industry does not form the subject of our story. It is, at the very most, only the background for the action. The author, who has a moderate taste for exceptional subjects, thinks, in effect, that making a film consecrated to the cinema is as dangerous as writing a play the heroes of which are comedians or a novel the main character of which is a novelist. It would be fortunate, however, if the reader understood that, by prompting remembrances of the artisans who, between 1900 and 1910, gave birth, in France, to the first cinema industry in the world, their pupil wanted to render homage to their memory."

Clair acknowledged an influence on his own script from Molière's L'École des femmes, with its story of an older man's rivalry with a younger one for the affections of the same woman.

The central role of M. Émile was originally intended for Raimu, but after his unexpected death in 1946, it was taken on by Maurice Chevalier, who was appearing in his first film for seven years.

=== American version ===
For the release of the film in the United States under the title Man About Town, Clair experimented with an English-language version which did not use either subtitles or dubbing. Working with American screenwriter Robert Pirosh, he produced a running English commentary on the action and the dialogue which was spoken on the soundtrack by Chevalier during the pauses in the French dialogue. The effect was supposed to be that of sitting next to a friend who explained what was being said when necessary, but in the event audiences were put off by finding the same voice/character feature both within the action on-screen as well as commenting on it off-screen, which seemed to diminish credibility.

For this version, an additional musical scene was filmed in which Maurice Chevalier sang "Place Pigalle". The American version was, however, shortened to a running time of 89 minutes (compared with 106 minutes for the original French version).

When the film was shown in London in 1948, it appeared under its original French title and was subtitled; the running time was however recorded as 99 minutes.

== Reception ==
In France, Le silence est d'or was welcomed for marking not just the return of Clair to France, but his resumption of the preoccupations and the wit and elegance of his pre-war films.

In the UK, the film received some qualified enthusiasm, alongside a feeling that it did not represent Clair at his best. For example: "...film and audience most enjoy themselves when the action is confined to the studio with sets and all the paraphernalia of primitive film-making perpetually collapsing and a quartet of hands, strayed from some Gallic crazy gang, eternally playing cards... This is not a major film of Clair's, but it is an authentic one..."; "This film is absolutely enchanting... There is some wonderful slapstick... It must be admitted that this is not the best work of René Clair, and because of this many may be disappointed with the occasionally flagging dialogue and slowing up of the tempo".

In the US, the film did poor business with the public, possibly hampered by the experiment with a hybrid-language version. The critic of The New York Times said, "He has treated a rather small idea in a small and generally unimaginative way, and the only faint touch of irony in it is a typical 'happy ending', well contrived."

Clair himself, while retaining an affection for the film, admitted to some shortcomings, particularly in respect of a certain heaviness in the exposition of the opening scenes. For the resolution of the story, he felt that he had not satisfied the maxim that "the public must always be surprised by what it expects". He also expressed reservations about the prominence of dialogue especially in a film which both characters and setting explored the virtues of silence: "I am convinced that in a work for the cinema the dialogue should have no more importance than it has in a novel, and that it is always more worthwhile to express oneself with images than with words."

== Awards ==
1947 Locarno International Film Festival

- Won: Golden Leopard
- Won: Best Direction Award

1948 French Syndicate of Cinema Critics

- Won: Prix Méliès
