= 4th Locarno Film Festival =

Film festival in Locarno, Switzerland

- Location: Locarno, Switzerland
- Founded: 1946
- Awards: Grand Prix
- Festival date: Opening: 8 July 1949; Closing: 17 July 1949
- Website: Locarno Film Festival

Locarno Film Festival
- 5th 3rd

The 4th Locarno Film Festival was held from 8 July to 17 July, 1949 in Locarno, Switzerland. The festival created official awards this year and gave out the grand prize, in later years called the Golden Leopard, to The Farm of Seven Sins by Jean Devaivre. Ten films were entered for prize judging.

== Screenings ==
The following films screened in these sections:

=== Programme principal / Longs métrages en compétition ===
English title	Original Title	Director(s)	Year	Production Country
Adam and Evelyne	Adam Und Evelyne	Harold French	1949	Great Britain
Bill And Coo		Dan Riesner	1948	USA
The Lost Face	Das Verlorene Gesicht		1948	Germany
The Time with You	Die Zeit Mit Dir	Georg Hurdalek	1948	Germany
Duel with Death	Duell Mit Dem Tod	Paul May	1949	Austria
Enchantment		Irving Reis	1948	USA
Port of Call	Hamnstad	Ingmar Bergman	1948	Sudan
He Walked By Night		Alfred Werker	1948	USA
The Mill on the Po	Il Mulino Del Po	Alberto Lattuada	1949	Italy
Equator with a hundred faces	L'Equateur Aux Cent Visages	André Cauvin	1948	Belgium
The Farm of Seven Sins	La Ferme Des Sept Peches	Jean Devaivre	1949	France
Bicycle Thieves	Ladri Di Biciclette	Vittorio De Sica	1948	Italy
The Sorcerer of the Sky	Le Sorcier Du Ciel	Marcel Blistène	1949	France
Love '47	Liebe '47	Wolfgang Liebeneiner	1949	Germany
Mission A Tanger		André Hunebelle	1949	France
White Paws	Pattes Blanches	Jean Grémillon	1949	France
Quartet		Ken Annakin, Arthur Crabtree	1948	Great Britain
Silent Dust		Lance Comfort	1948	Great Britain
Sorry, Wrong Number		Anatole Litvak	1948	USA
That Lady In Ermine		Ernst Lubitsch, Otto Preminger	1948	USA
The Big Cat		Phil Carlson	1949	USA
The Girl from the Marsh Croft	Toesen Fran Stormytorpet	Gustav Edgren	1947	Sudan
Yellow Sky		William A. Wellman	1948	USA

=== Special Sections / Private Visions ===
Title	Director(s)	Year	Production Country
Combats Sans Haine	André Michel		Switzerland
Cry Of The Citiy	Robert Siodmark	1948	USA
Jour De Fête	Jacques Tati	1947	France
L'Escadron Blanc	René Chanas	1949	France
Le Secret De Mayerling	Jean Delannoy	1949	France

== Official Awards ==
- Grand Prix de Locarno: The Farm of Seven Sins by Jean Devaivre
- Special Jury Prize: Bicycle Thieves by Vittorio De Sica
- Special Prize for the Best Crime Movie: HE WALKED BY NIGHT by Alfred Werker
- Special Prize for the Film that has combine the Photography and the Assembly better: White Paws by Jean Grémillon
- Best Director: William A. Wellman for the film YELLOW SKY
- Best Actress: Hilde Krahl in Love '47
- Special Prize for the Best Realisation: ENCHANTMENT by Irving Reis
- Special Prize for the Funniest Film: Adam and Evelyne by Harold French
