= Germany, Year Zero =

1948 film by Roberto Rossellini

- Italian: Germania anno zero
- Directed by: Roberto Rossellini
- Written by: Roberto Rossellini (screenplay and dialogue); Max Colpet (dialogue); Carlo Lizzani (dialogue)
- Produced by: Salvo D'Angelo; Roberto Rossellini
- Starring: Edmund Moeschke; Ernst Pittschau; Ingetraud Hinze; Franz-Otto Krüger; Erich Gühne
- Cinematography: Robert Juillard
- Edited by: Eraldo Da Roma
- Music by: Renzo Rossellini
- Production companies: Produzione Salvo D'Angelo and Tevere Film
- Distributed by: G.D.B. Film
- Release date: 1 December 1948
- Running time: 78 minutes
- Countries: Italy; France; Germany
- Languages: German; English; French
- Budget: $115,000

Germany, Year Zero (Italian: Germania anno zero) is a 1948 film directed by Roberto Rossellini. It follows the life of a twelve-year-old boy in post World War II Germany. It won the Golden Leopard and the Best Director awards at the Locarno International Film Festival in 1948.

As in many neorealist films, Rossellini used mainly local, non-professional actors. He filmed on locations in Berlin and intended to convey the reality in Germany the year after its near total destruction in World War II. It contains dramatic images of bombed out Berlin and of the human struggle for survival following the destruction of Nazi Germany. When explaining his ideas about realism in an interview, he said, "realism is nothing other than the artistic form of truth."

== Plot ==
Twelve-year-old Edmund Köhler lives in devastated, Allied-occupied Berlin with his ailing, bedridden father and his adult siblings, Eva and Karl-Heinz. Eva manages to obtain cigarettes by going out with Allied soldiers, but resists others' expectations to prostitute herself. Karl-Heinz, the older son, is a burden to the struggling family as he refuses to register with the police and obtain a ration card, fearing punishment by the authorities for his prior service in the Wehrmacht. The Köhlers and others have been assigned to the apartment home of the Rademachers by the housing authority, much to Mr. Rademacher's irritation.

Edmund does what he can for his family, trying to find work and selling a scale for Mr. Rademacher on the black market. By chance, Edmund meets Herr Henning, his former school teacher, who remains a Nazi at heart. Henning gives him a recording of Hitler to sell to the occupying soldiers, entrusting him to the more experienced Jo and Christl. Henning gives Edmund 10 marks for his work. Afterward, Edmund tags along as the young man Jo steals 40 marks from a woman by pretending to sell her a bar of soap. Jo gives Edmund some of his stolen potatoes and leaves the inexperienced boy with Christl, whom another member of their gang describes as a mattress that dispenses cigarettes.

After Mr. Köhler takes a turn for the worse, Henning tells Edmund that life is cruel and that the weak should be sacrificed so that the strong can survive. A kindly doctor manages to get Mr. Köhler admitted to a hospital, where he receives much more plentiful and healthy food. This temporarily relieves some of the pressure on his family. When Edmund goes to see his father, the old man bemoans his misery. He tells his son that he has considered suicide but lacks the courage to carry it out. He says that he is a burden and that it would be better if he were dead. Edmund steals some poison while no one is looking.

A few days later, the father is discharged and returns home. Edmund poisons his tea just before police raid the apartment and Karl-Heinz finally turns himself in. The father dies while his elder son is in custody. Everyone assumes the death is due to malnutrition and sickness. When Karl-Heinz returns, he is crushed by the news.

A disturbed Edmund wanders the city. He turns first to Christl, but she is busy with young men and has no time for or interest in a youngster. He goes to Henning and confesses that he did as the schoolteacher had suggested, murdering his father, but Henning protests that he never told the boy to kill anyone. When Edmund tries to join younger children in a street game of soccer, they reject him. He ascends the ruins of a bombed out building, and watches from a hole in the wall as they take his father's coffin away across the street. Finally, after hearing his sister call for him, he jumps from the building to his death.

== Cast ==
- Edmund Moeschke as Edmund Köhler (as Edmund Meschke)
- Ernst Pittschau as Mr. Köhler
- Ingetraud Hinze as Eva Köhler (as Ingetraud Hinz)
- Franz-Otto Krüger as Karl-Heinz Köhler (as Franz Grüger)
- Erich Gühne as Herr Henning, the (former) teacher

== Production ==
=== Pre-production ===
Rossellini visited Berlin in March 1947 with a vague idea of making this film. Rossellini then returned to Rome and secured funding for the film from the French company Union Générale Cinématographique and his friends Salvo D'Angelo and Alfredo Guarini. He also got equipment and crew members from the German company Sadfi. Rossellini then returned to Berlin in July 1947 to continue research for the film and select a suitable cast.

=== Casting ===
As was his usual custom, Rossellini cast the film with non-professionals that he met on the street. Rossellini found Ernst Pittschau sitting on the front steps of a retirement home and discovered that he had been a silent film actor forty years earlier. He saw former ballet dancer Ingetraud Hinze standing in a food line and was struck with the look of despair on her face. Franz-Otto Krüger came from a family of academics and had been imprisoned by the Gestapo during the war. Other smaller parts were cast with such people as a former Wehrmacht general, an ex-wrestler, a literature and art history professor, a model and a group of children that were bored of living on the streets.

For the lead role of Edmund, Rossellini wanted to find a young German boy who physically resembled his recently deceased son Romano Rossellini. After auditioning several young boys, Rossellini went to a performance of the Barlay circus one night to see the elephants. There he saw an eleven-year-old acrobat named Edmund Meschke and immediately asked Meschke to audition for him. Rossellini combed Meschke's hair to resemble his son and, amazed at the physical resemblance, immediately cast him in the lead role. The finished film began with the title "This film is dedicated to the memory of my son Romano. — Roberto Rossellini"

=== Filming ===
Shooting began on 15 August 1947 with no formal script and Rossellini instructing the actors to improvise their dialogue. Rossellini directed the film in French and had to depend on Max Colpet to translate for him throughout shooting. While filming on location in the streets of Berlin, Rossellini was amazed by the indifference to a film crew from people on the streets who were far too preoccupied with attempting to get food and survive. When Rossellini went to Rome for a week in the middle of shooting to spend time with his then mistress Anna Magnani, Carlo Lizzani directed some scenes in his absence. In mid-September location shooting in Berlin wrapped after 40 days and the production moved to Rome on 26 September 1947 to film the interior scenes.

When the German actors arrived in Rome they had to wait until November to resume filming because the film's sets had not been built. By November the previously malnourished Germans had gained a noticeable amount of weight while in Rome and had to be put on crash diets so as to retain continuity with their earlier scenes. After filming in Rome was complete most of the German actors didn't want to go back to Berlin and a few ran away to the Italian countryside. The film's final budget was $115,000.

== Reception ==
This film was in many ways vastly different from Rossellini's previous neorealism films, in that it was mostly shot in a studio and used rear screen projections for the Berlin scenes. Many critics who had previously championed Rossellini condemned the film for being melodramatic and disappointingly unrealistic. Rossellini stated that he wanted to "tell a story of a child, of an innocent creature which a distorted 'utopian' education induced to commit murder in the belief that he was performing a heroic gesture. But a feeble light of morality is not yet extinguished in him; driven by those small gleams of conscious, confused, he commits suicide." Jean Georges Auriol called it hasty and superficial. Andre Bazin called it "not a movie but a sketch, a rough draft of a work Rossellini hasn't given us." However, L'Écran français called it revolutionary, and Charlie Chaplin said it was "the most beautiful Italian film" he had ever seen. Rossellini said that "I don't think it's possible to say more bad things about a film than were said about Germany Year Zero."

Most Germans disliked the film's negative and pessimistic attitude. The film was first screened in Germany in 1952 at a brief Munich film club screening and was not seen again until it was shown on German TV in 1978. In 1949 Austrian film critic Hans Habe called it "a terrifying film...not artistically, but because it would be terrifying if the world saw the new Germany as Rossellini does." It premiered in New York in September 1949 and was negatively compared to Bicycle Thieves. Bosley Crowther said that the film had "a strange emptiness of genuine feeling." Nevertheless it won the Golden Leopard and the Best Director awards at the Locarno International Film Festival in 1948.
