= Vinicio Beretta =

Swiss-Italian Film Critic

- Born: April 3, 1920; Lugano, Switzerland
- Died: April 2, 1972 (aged 51); Lugano, Switzerland
- Citizenship: Switzerland; Italy
- Occupations: Film Critic; Film Festival Director
- Known for: Locarno Film Festival

Vinicio Beretta (3 April 1920 – 2 April 1972) was an Italian-Swiss film critic. He was a founding member of the Swiss Association of Film Critics and co-founder of the Locarno Film Festival and its director from 1960-1966. Berretta was also president of the International Federation of Film Critics (FIPRESCI) and worked at Radiotelevisione svizzera for over 30 years.

== Life ==
Beretta was born and raised in the Lugano, Switzerland. He was an Italian citizen who became a naturalized Swiss citizen. He lived in Lugano much of his life and died there in 1972 at the age of 51.

== Career ==
Beretta was an Italian film critic who worked for the Italian-speaking Swiss radio and television broadcaster RSI for over 30 years As a critic he severed on juries for film festivals such as the Venice Film Festival, the Valladolid Film Festival and the Kraków Film Festival.

In 1946, he helped launch in the Locarno Film Festival, hosting the official ceremonies. Soon he was helping organize the festival as a film scout and, from 1953 to 1959, was the festival secretary. In 1960, Beretta became the festival director and chef of the Locarno Film Festival. The following year, in 1961, he also became president of the International Federation of Film Critics (FIPRESCI)

Beretta helped establish Locarno's reputation for showing films from behind the Iron Curtain. His choice to screen these film at Locarno was in part due to his artistic ambitions for the festival to show significant new films, the desire to create a unique festival and lack of interest from American distributors in screening at the festival in its early history. Beretta was able to show many films from the Eastern Bloc that were not show at any other festivals and, in 1955, Locarno was one of the first festivals to screen films from communist China.

Beretta was often attacked by those that thought Locarno programing was too left-wing. Many Swiss distributors and those in Switzerland’s German-language conservative press were opposed to Beretta's Locarno, especially after the festival began to receive state funding. Those opposed included the trade organizations: the Swiss film distributors and cinema operators (the SLV and the SFV). Beretta was a member of the Swiss Social Democratic Party (Partito socialista), a long-standing Swiss party, and leftist, but was not a communist. He frequently had to voice this in public and private to defend his reputation and protect the festival's future.

In 1961, those Swiss cinema trade groups and some in the Swiss-German media launched a press campaign against Berreta to force him out of Locarno, accusing him of being a communism. These accusation were often coupled with xenophobia, as Beretta had recently become a Swiss citizen.. This imposed a large mental strain on Beretta, who continued to run the festival for many years, but eventually lead to his departure from the festival in 1966.

Beretta continued on as a film critic after the festival, but died six years later, in 1972.
