= And Then There Were None (1945 film) =

1945 film by René Clair

- American film poster
- Directed by: René Clair
- Written by: Dudley Nichols
- Based on: And Then There Were None; 1939 novel by Agatha Christie
- Produced by: René Clair; Harry M. Popkin
- Starring: Barry Fitzgerald; Walter Huston; Louis Hayward
- Cinematography: Lucien N. Andriot
- Edited by: Harvey Manger
- Music by: Mario Castelnuovo-Tedesco
- Distributed by: 20th Century Fox
- Release date: October 30, 1945
- Running time: 97 minutes
- Country: United States
- Language: English
- Budget: $1 million
- Box office: $1 million

And Then There Were None is a 1945 film adaptation of Agatha Christie's 1939 mystery novel of the same name, directed by René Clair. It was released in the United Kingdom as Ten Little Indians, in keeping with the third United Kingdom title of Christie's novel. The film was released by 20th Century Fox and due to the lapsed copyright, it is now in the public domain. The film has been remastered multiple times and is freely available online.

== Plot ==
Eight people, all strangers to each other, are invited to a small isolated island off the coast of Devon, England, by a Mr and Mrs Owen. They settle in at a mansion tended by two newly hired servants, Thomas and Ethel Rogers (a married couple), but their hosts are absent. When the guests sit down to dinner, they notice the centerpiece, ten figurines of Indians. Thomas puts on a gramophone record, through which a man's voice accuses them all of murder:

- General Sir John Mandrake – ordering his wife's lover, a lieutenant under his command, to his death
- Emily Brent – the death of her young nephew
- Dr Edward G. Armstrong – drunkenness which resulted in a patient dying
- Prince Nikita Starloff – killing a couple while speeding in a car
- Vera Claythorne – murdering her sister's fiancé
- Judge Francis J. Quinncannon – being responsible for the hanging of an innocent man
- Philip Lombard – causing the deaths of 21 South African tribesmen
- William H. Blore – perjury, resulting in an innocent man's death
- Thomas and Ethel Rogers – the demise of their previous employer, an invalid

It becomes apparent that none of them knows or has even seen U. N. Owen and they realize the name stands for "unknown." They also cannot leave the island, as Rogers informs them that the boat will not return until Monday, and it is only Friday.

Starloff admits his guilt, then dies after his drink is poisoned. The next morning, it is discovered that Mrs Rogers died in her sleep. The guests notice that one figurine is broken and another missing and with the two deaths matching the Ten Little Indians nursery rhyme, they search the island for "Mr. Owen" without success. After General Mandrake is stabbed to death, the judge declares that Owen must be one of them.

They vote on who they suspect Owen is; as the only person to get more than one vote, Rogers is made to sleep in the woodshed. The next morning, they find him dead, his head split open with an axe. Miss Brent dies next, her body found with a hypodermic needle nearby. Armstrong discovers that his needle is missing, as is Lombard's revolver.

At dinner, Quinncannon, Armstrong, Blore and Lombard all confess to their crimes. When it is Miss Claythorne's turn, she excuses herself to get her coat and the others hear her shriek and rush to her. In the confusion, a single gunshot is heard. They find her shaken after being brushed by seaweed hanging from the ceiling. They also find Lombard's gun, with Quinncannon dead from a shot to the head.

Miss Claythorne insists she is innocent, but Armstrong suspects her and locks her in her room. That night, Claythorne admits to Lombard that her sister killed her own fiancé, and that Claythorne helped her cover up the crime and took the blame. The two later realize Armstrong is missing.

The next morning, Blore is struck by stonework toppled from the floor above. Lombard sees a corpse on the beach, which turns out to be Armstrong. Miss Claythorne holds Lombard's gun against him, certain that he must be the killer. He tells her that his real name is Charles Morley, and that the real Lombard was his friend who committed suicide. Morley urges her to shoot but deliberately miss him – he then drops as if shot.

She returns to the house and finds a noose hanging in the parlor and discovers that Quinncannon, who is very much alive, is the mysterious Mr Owen. The judge tells her that all his life he had searched for perfect justice. After learning that he was terminally ill, he concocted this plan. He persuaded Armstrong to help him fake his own death, then murdered him. He tells her that she can either hang herself or be sent to the gallows (as the only possible perpetrator). He then drinks poisoned whiskey, while Morley appears behind him, alive and well. Quinncannon dies and the boat arrives, rescuing Morley and Miss Claythorne.

== Cast ==
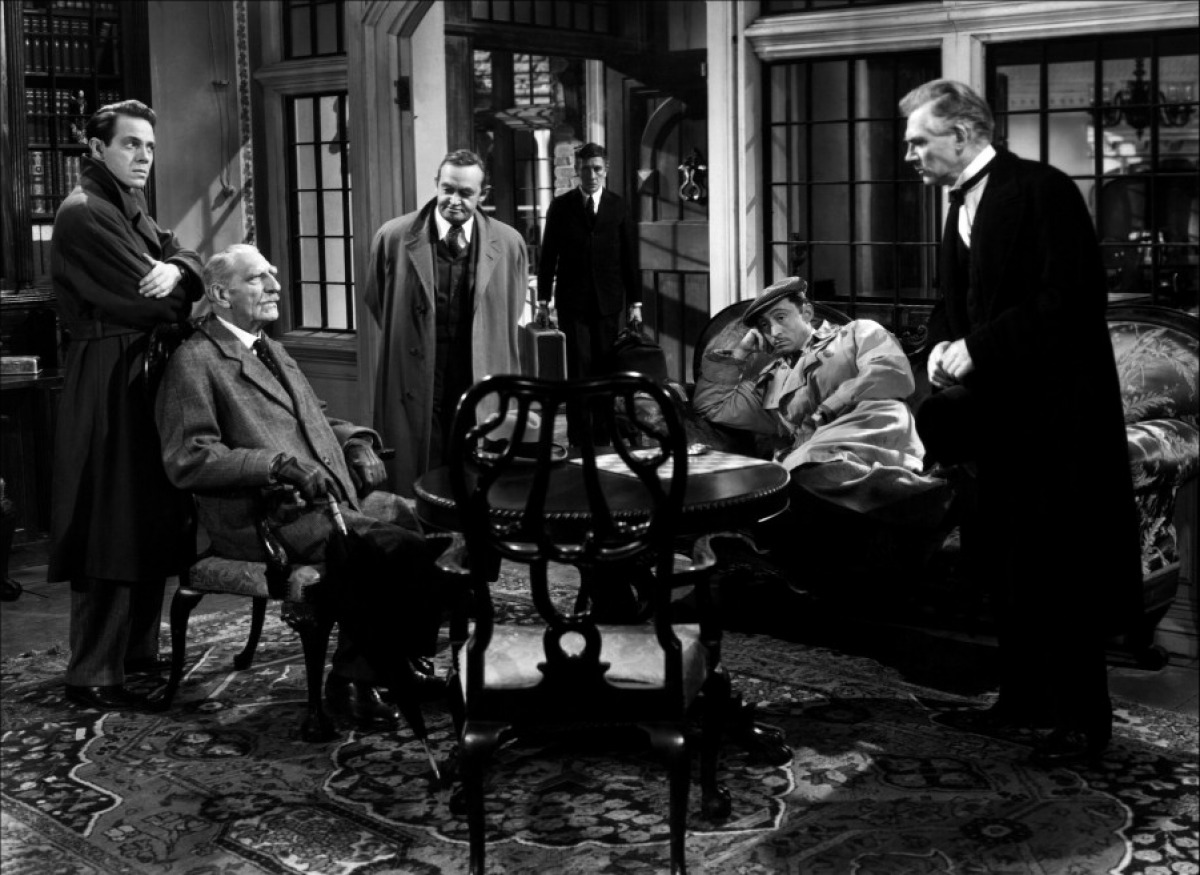
From left: Louis Hayward, C. Aubrey Smith, Barry Fitzgerald, Richard Haydn, Mischa Auer, and Walter Huston in And Then There Were None (1945)

The cast included:

- Barry Fitzgerald as Judge Francis J. Quinncannon
- Walter Huston as Dr. Edward G. Armstrong
- Louis Hayward as Philip Lombard / Charles Morley
- Roland Young as Detective William Henry Blore
- June Duprez as Vera Claythorne, a girls' school mistress
- Mischa Auer as Prince Nikita "Nikki" Starloff
- C. Aubrey Smith as General Sir John Mandrake
- Judith Anderson as Emily Brent, an elderly spinster
- Richard Haydn as Thomas Rogers, the butler
- Queenie Leonard as Ethel Rogers, the cook and housekeeper
- Harry Thurston as Fred Narracott, the boatman

== Production ==
Rene Clair said the film "isn't interesting because it isn't personal. The only interesting part of making the film was working on the adaptation with Dudley Nichols. The mystery story is full of little bluffs, little deceits that can't be presented on the screen. It was intriguing to find ways of working around them. And of course we had to change Agatha Christie's tone since we conceived the picture more or less as a comedy."

== Reception ==
On first release in 1945, Bosley Crowther of The New York Times wrote: "René Clair has produced an exciting film and has directed a splendid cast in it with humor and a light macabre touch. The temptation to the horrifying is intelligently dismissed". The film kept its audience involved "from fear and trembling, not from gore." Several performances were commended, especially Walter Huston and Barry Fitzgerald. Variety magazine, however, described the film as a "dull whodunit" which "rarely rises to moments of suspense and despite the killings it gives the appearance of nothing ever happening". Most of the cast, Variety thought, seemed out of place.

Film critic Leonard Maltin awarded the film four out of four stars, calling it "Highly suspenseful" and praising the film's script, music score, and visuals. On Rotten Tomatoes, the film holds an approval rating of 100% based on 12 reviews, with a weighted average rating of 8.1/10.

== Awards ==
The film won the Golden Leopard and the Best Direction Award at the 1946 Locarno International Film Festival.

== Distribution and copyright ==
Though it was distributed by a major studio, 20th Century Fox, the copyright was allowed to lapse and the film is now in the public domain. Several different editions of varying quality have been released to home video formats.

The name of the film sometimes varies with who listed it. In 1960, Radio Times altered the title to Ten Little Niggers for an airing of Clair's film on BBC television on 9 July. This was the original title of the novel as published in the UK.

Sensitivity to the original title of the novel was remarked by Sadie Stein in 2016, commenting on a BBC miniseries with the title And Then There Were None, which she said "has been an enormous hit in the UK." In general, "Christie’s work is not known for its racial sensitivity, and by modern standards her oeuvre is rife with casual Orientalism." Stein quotes Alison Light as to the power of the original name of the island in the novel, Nigger Island, "to conjure up a thrilling ‘otherness’, a place where revelations about the ‘dark side’ of the English would be appropriate." Speaking of the "widely known" 1945 movie, Stein added that "we’re merely faced with fantastic amounts of violence, and a rhyme so macabre and distressing one doesn’t hear it now outside of the Agatha Christie context." She felt that the original title of the novel in the UK, seen now, "jars, viscerally."

== Later film versions ==
Multiple versions of Christie's mystery have been filmed, including Ten Little Indians (1965), And Then There Were None (1974), Desyat Negrityat (1987),Ten Little Indians (1989), and And Then There Were None (2015) (TV series).

== See also ==
- List of films in the public domain in the United States
