= Grand Hotel (Locarno) =

Hotel in Locarno, Switzerland

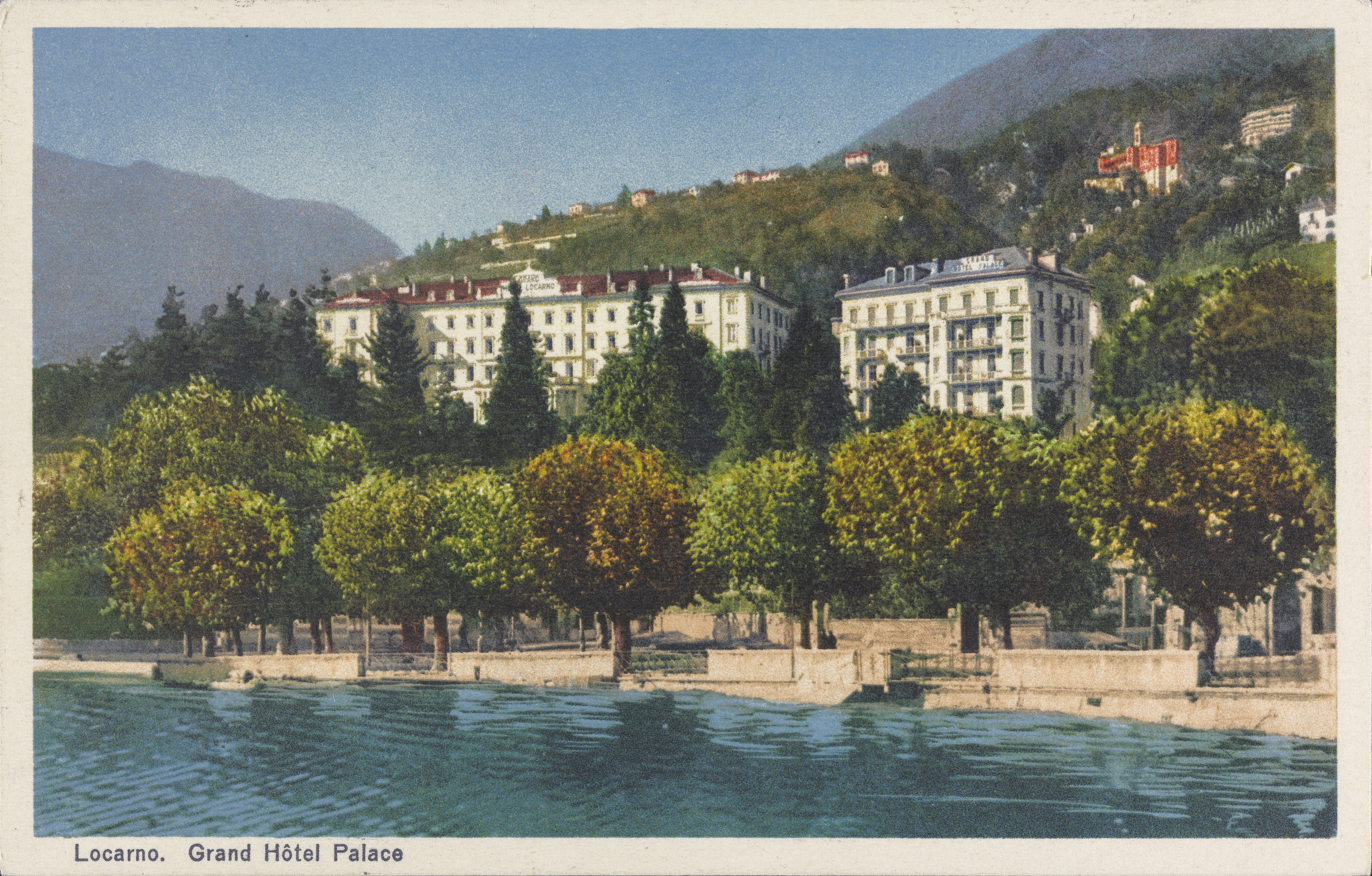
- Interactive map of the Grand Hotel area

General information
- Location: Locarno, Ticino, Switzerland
- Coordinates: 46°10′N 8°48′E
- Inaugurated: 1876

Design and construction
- Architect: Francesco Galli

The Grand Hotel is a hotel in Locarno, Ticino, Switzerland, first opened in 1876.

== History ==
The Grand Hotel was opened in the Swiss resort town of Locarno in 1876, following the opening of the Gotthard Tunnel and the railway station in Locarno. It was built to a design by Francesco Galli. Until the hotel closed in 2005, it had a station on the Locarno-Madonna del Sasso funicular.

In 2005 the hotel closed. The furniture was sold, with exception of the gigantic Murano chandelier in the hall, long considered to be the biggest in Europe. Six restoration projects were proposed, without implementation. In 2022 the Artisa real estate group of Stefano and Alain Artioli commenced a comprehensive renovation, costing 100 million Euros. With the renovations, the hotel will become 5-star, with three restaurants. Reopening is due to occur in 2025.
