= Locarno Film Festival =

Annual film festival in Switzerland

Coordinates: 46.169623°N 8.796011°E

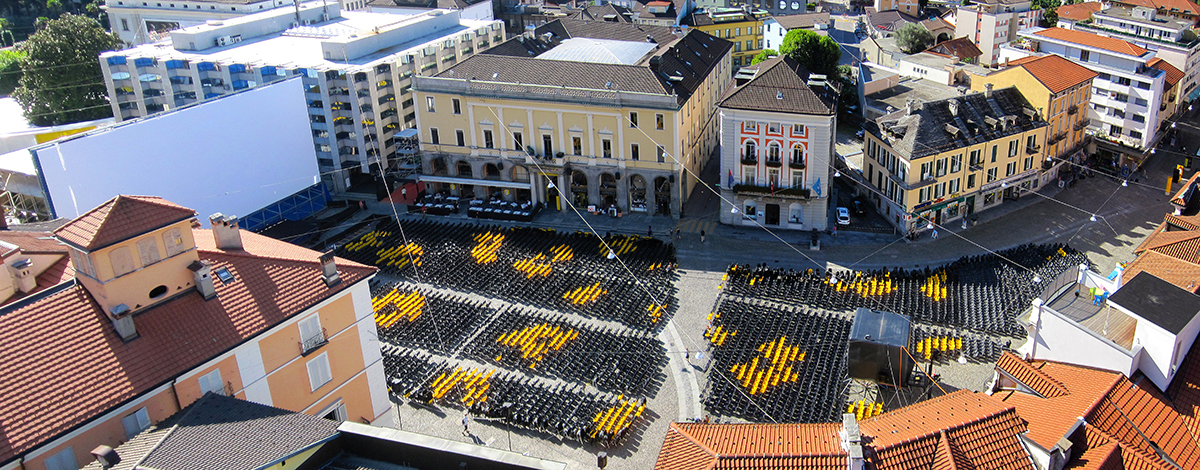
- Piazza Grande screening venue
- Location: Locarno, Switzerland
- Founded: 1946; 80 years ago
- Awards: Golden Leopard
- Hosted by: Associazione Festival del film Locarno
- Website: locarnofestival.ch

Current: 79th (2026)
- 80th 78th

The Locarno International Film Festival is a major international film festival held annually in Locarno, Switzerland. Founded in 1946, the festival screens films in various competitive and non-competitive sections, including feature-length narrative, documentary, short, avant-garde, and retrospective programs. The Piazza Grande section is held in an open-air venue that seats over 6,000 spectators.

The top prize of the festival is the Golden Leopard, awarded to the best film in the International Competition. Other awards include the Leopard of Honour for career achievement, and the Prix du Public, the public choice award.

== History ==
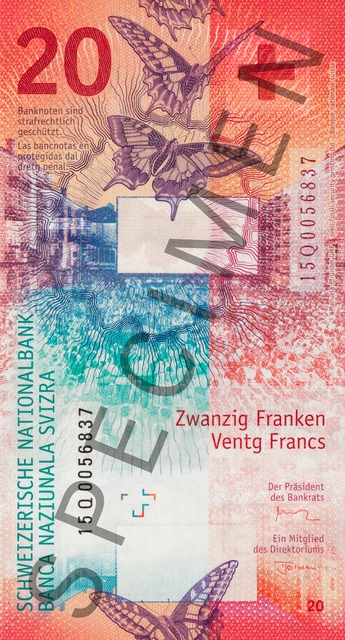
The open-air screening of the Locarno Film Festival on the Piazza Grande is featured on the Swiss twenty-franc banknote since 2017.

The Locarno Film Festival was established by the tourist office Pro Locarno and several professionals from the movie industry. As stated by cinema historians, it emerged as a 'grassroots celebration' and mostly oriented on attracting tourists to Locarno, offering various entertainment events such as fashion shows and excursions.

The inaugural evening took place on 23 August 1946, at the Grand Hotel of Locarno with the screening of the movie O sole mio directed by Giacomo Gentilomo. The first edition was organized in less than three months with a line-up of fifteen movies, mainly American and Italian, among which was Rome, Open City directed by Roberto Rossellini, And Then There Were None directed by René Clair (1945), Double Indemnity by Billy Wilder (1944) and The Song of Bernadette by Henry King (1943).

Until the mid-1950s, LFF was allowed to screen only the movies that were commercially distributed in Switzerland. The authorities considered LLF to be a private event and did not support it financially, which is why the festival experienced constant difficulties. The 1951 edition was cancelled due to a lack of funding. In 1953, LFF was downgraded to the D rank in FIAPF classification. In response to such a loss of prestige, in 1954 the government acknowledged LFF as an event of national significance which allowed the festival to send invitations to film-producing countries via diplomatic channels and thus Swiss distributors could finally import movies out of their annual quota specifically for the festival.

Under Vinicio Beretta, LFF opened up to national cinematographies, especially those of Eastern Europe. Since 1953, every year the festival has screened features from Eastern Germany, the USSR, etc. Managed mostly by the Pro Locarno tourists office, it strived to offer the visitors an extraordinary entertainment and stood out as an international meeting point in a neutral country. The critics, however, accused the event of communist propaganda, as the anthems of socialist countries were played before the screenings of their films and their flags raised during the ceremony. The accusations made the Swiss intelligence services closely monitor the festival, while the officials insisted on lesser selection of features from the Eastern bloc.

In 1956, a commercial dispute between Swiss distributors and foreign producers amidst heavy political tension in connection to the repression of the 1956 Budapest insurrection led to cancellation of the 1956 LFF edition. This caused the Swiss authorities to ask the FIAPF to cease attacks on LFF. In 1959, the festival accessed the A-rank. It shifted to July, to higher tourist season, and introduced retrospectives in collaboration with the Cinemathèque suisse.

Under Vinicio Beretta, LFF director since 1960, the festival finally procured state financial support. By then, the festival had gained a unique reputation as an alternative "to traditional commercial distribution" as it pioneered Italian Neo-Realism, Latin American and Asian cinema, and especially Polish, Czechoslovak, and Hungarian New Waves. Another major scandal occurred when the jury of the 1960 edition awarded the highest prize to the Soviet movie Foma Gordeyev. Political tensions and accusations forced Beretta to accept the creation of a "national" selection commission, offered by the authorities.

The festival's most successful era was under Moritz de Hadeln, who succeeded in internationalizing and stabilizing the LFF during the 1970s. The year 1971 also marked the introduction of one of the Locarno festival's most famous features: the huge open-air theater the Piazza Grande. Each year in the town square the screen is constructed and every year it draws crowds of thousands to watch films outside.

Later, the Locarno Film Festival presented features and short films by many international directors such as Claude Chabrol, Stanley Kubrick, Paul Verhoeven, Miloš Forman, Marco Bellocchio, Glauber Rocha, Raúl Ruiz, Alain Tanner, Mike Leigh, Béla Tarr, Chen Kaige, Edward Yang, Alexandr Sokurov, Atom Egoyan, Jim Jarmusch, Ang Lee, Gregg Araki, Christoph Schaub, Catherine Breillat, Abbas Kiarostami, Gus Van Sant, Pedro Costa, Fatih Akin, Claire Denis and Kim Ki-Duk.

In 2018, the festival appointed Lili Hinstin as its new artistic director. Succeeding Carlo Chatrian, she became the second-only female director in the history of LFF (the first was Irene Bignardi). Hinstin actively promoted gender equality and shifted the balance so that more than 40% of features in the 2019 edition line-up were by female filmmakers. She also hired a younger programming team, launched innovative initiatives such as "Locarno 2020 – For The Future of Films". However, under her lead Locarno's industry side suffered, more so than its artistic side, which may have played a role in Hinstin's resignation.

2020 was marked with a major change in top positions: after Hinstin's resignation, sales exec Valentina Merli and Industry Days chief Nadia Dresti both stepped down. The 73rd edition, scheduled from 5 to 15 August 2020, was cancelled due to the COVID-19 pandemic, it was cancelled for the first time since 1956; in its place, the special edition called "Locarno 2020 – For the Future of Films" was held. The festival had asked high-profile directors including Lucrecia Martel and Lav Diaz to select films from the festival's 74-year history for a retrospective that was screened online and in physical locations.

In 2023, at the 76th Locarno Film Festival, the acting categories (Best Actor/Best Actress) became gender-neutral after the creation of the Best Performance Award, given to two or more actors with no gender restriction. In 2024, at the 77th Locarno Film Festival, the festival announced the special award Letterboxd Piazza Grande Award, in collaboration with social media site Letterboxd.

== Official awards and sections ==
=== Audience awards ===
- Prix du public, presented in partnership with UBS, Piazza Grande section films compete by audience vote.

=== Main Competition ===
- Golden Leopard (since 1946), the festival's main prize;
- Special Jury Prize (since 1949);
- Pardo for Best Direction (since 1946);
- Pardo for Best Performance (since 2023);

==== Former awards include ====
- Leopard for Best Actress
- Leopard for Best Actor

=== First Feature Competition ===
- First Feature Award, awarded by a jury of international critics to the first feature film presented in any festival's sections.

=== Filmmakers of the Present ===
- Golden Leopard - Filmmakers of the Present, prize awarded to the best film of the section, which is dedicated to first or second features.
- Ciné+ Special Jury Prize, French television channel Ciné+ Club offers the broadcast rights to the winning film.
- Leopard for Best New Director

=== Leopards of Tomorrow ===
- Pardino d'oro for the Best International Short Film, awarded to the best short film in the international short film competition;
- Pardino d'oro for the Best Swiss Short Film, awarded to the best short film in the national short film competition;
- Pardino d'argento for the international competition, awarded to the second best film in the international competition;
- Pardino d'argento Swiss Life for the national competition, awarded to the second best film in the national competition;
- Locarno short film nominee for the European Film Awards, awarded an automatic nomination in the short film category of the European Film Awards;
- Prize for Best Swiss Newcomer;
- Premio Medien Patent Verwaltung AG.

=== Pardo Verde Competition ===
- Green Pardo WWF In collaboration with WWF, the Green Pardo WWF is the prize that aims to find the film which best reflects the environmental theme in any of the Festival's competition sections. The award constitutes a Green statue and SFr 20,000 to the director.

=== Independent sections ===
There are also two sections for independent films:

- Critics' Week (Semaine de la Critique), at which selected international films are screened;
- Swiss Panorama (Panorama Suisse), in which "Swiss films that have enjoyed success at festivals, found an audience in cinemas, or are currently released in the country" are screened

== Direction and management ==
=== Artistic directors ===
- 1946–1958: Riccardo Bolla
- 1960–1965: Vinicio Beretta
- 1966: Sandro Bianconi
- 1967–1970: Sandro Bianconi, Freddy Buache
- 1971: Commission of direction, composed of seven members from Ticino
- 1972–1977: Moritz de Hadeln
- 1978–1981: Jean-Pierre Brossard
- 1982–1991: David Streiff
- 1992–2000: Marco Müller
- 2000–2005: Irene Bignardi
- 2005–2009: Frédéric Maire
- 2010–2012: Olivier Père
- 2012–2018: Carlo Chatrian
- 2018–2020: Lili Hinstin
- 2020: Nadia Dresti (interim)
- 2021– present: Giona A. Nazzaro

=== Presidents ===
- 1946–1955: Camillo Beretta
- 1957–1962: Enrico Franzioni
- 1963–1968: Fernando Gaja
- 1970–1980: Luciano Giudici
- 1981–1999: Raimondo Rezzonico
- 2000–2023: Marco Solari
- 2023– present: Maja Hoffmann

=== Chief operating officers ===
- 2006–2013: Marco Cacciamognaga
- 2013–2017: Mario Timbal
- 2017– present: Raphaël Brunschwig (Managing Director since 2022)

== Gallery ==
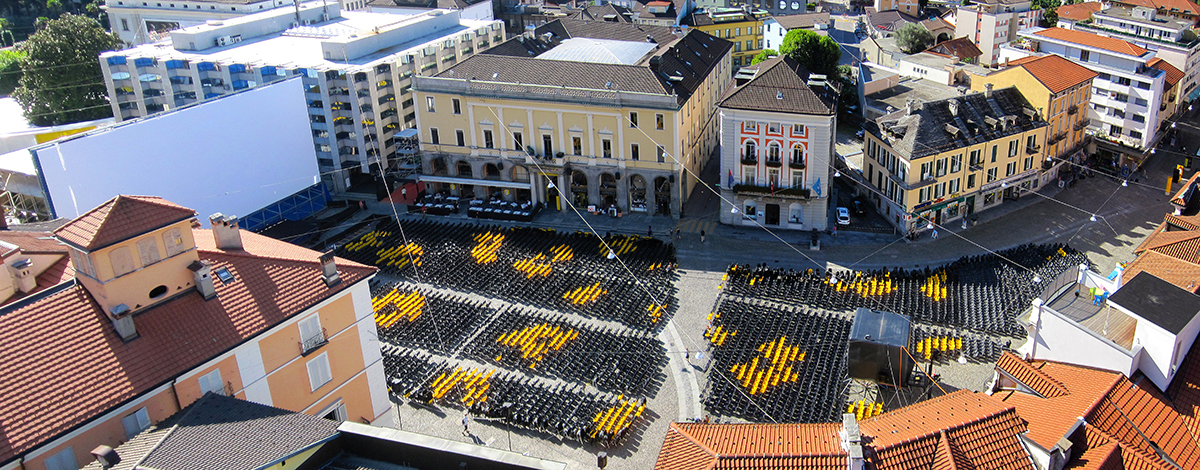
Piazza Grande screening venue

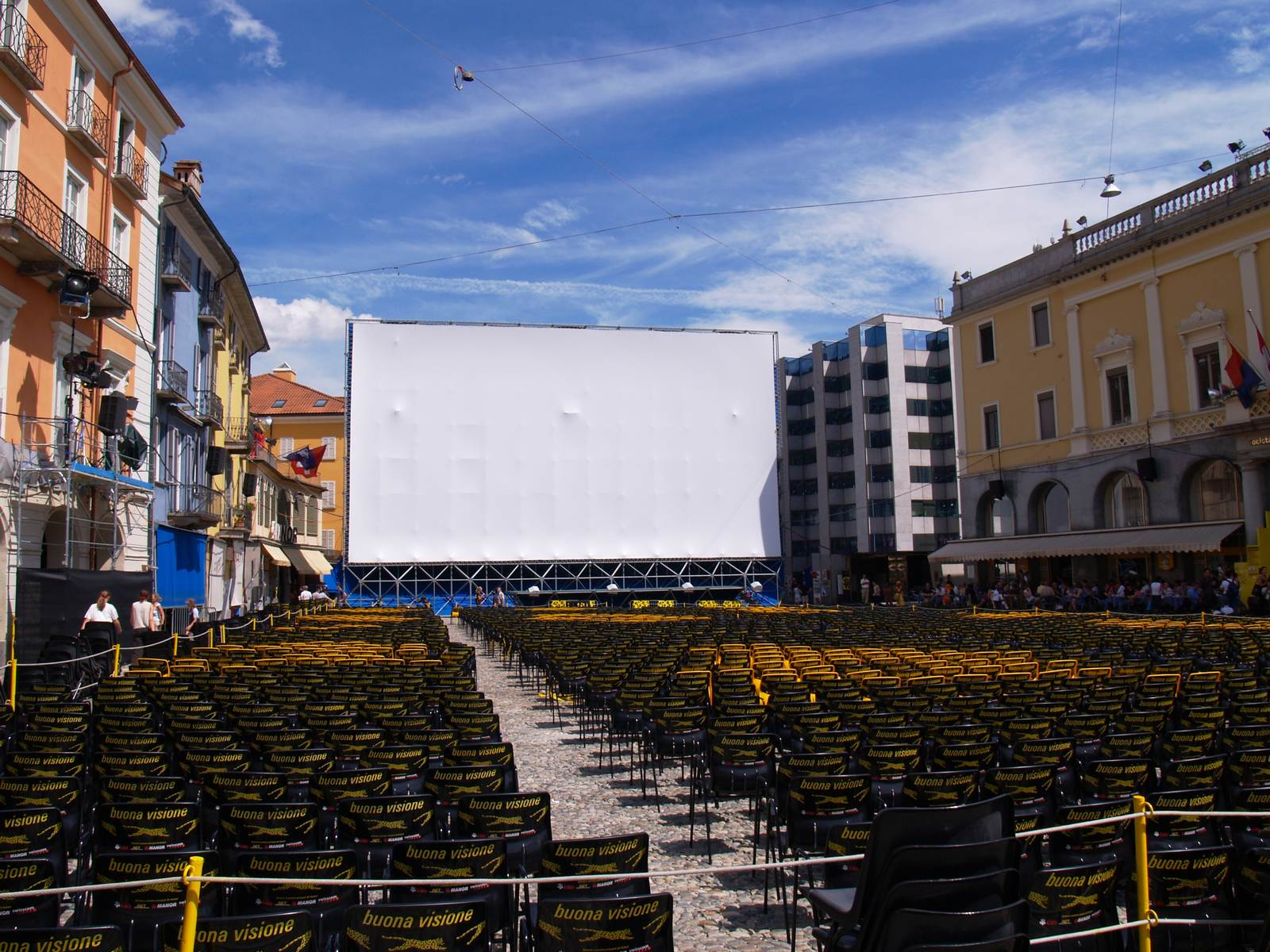
The screen in the Piazza Grande

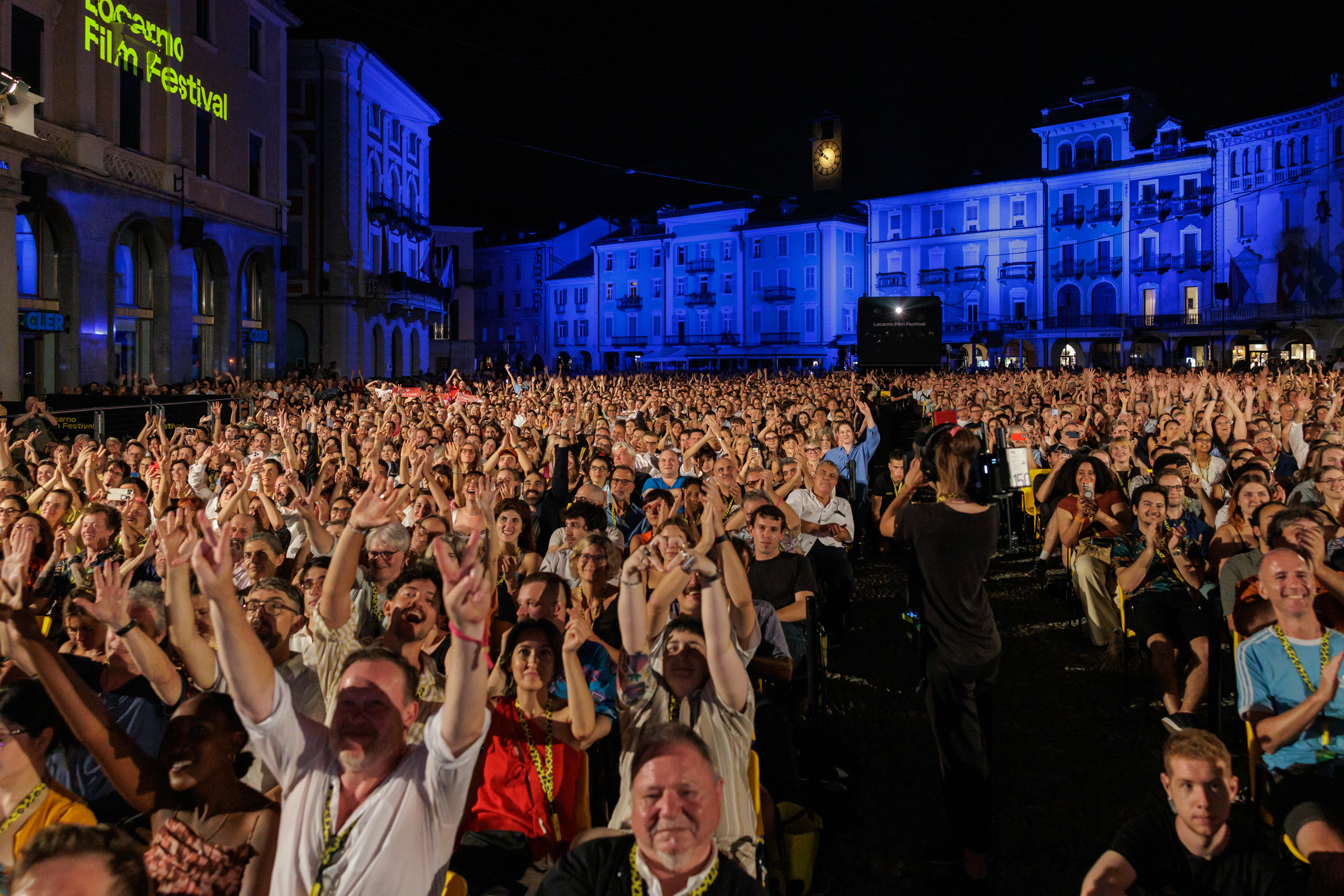
Public at screening 2025

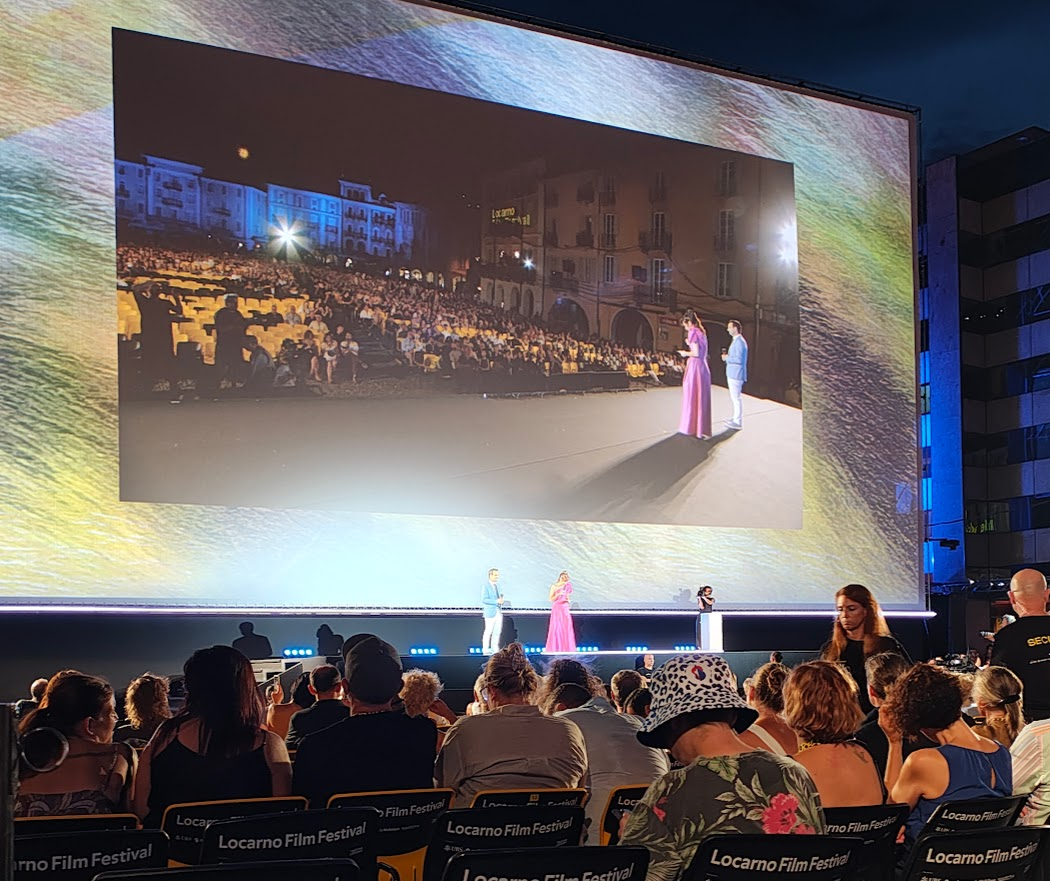
Piazza Grande award ceremony

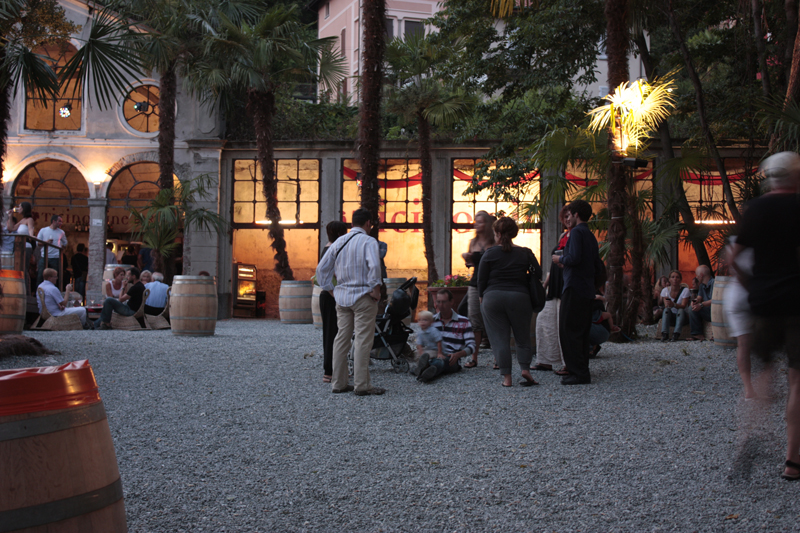
Night life during the Festival, Locarno City Garden.

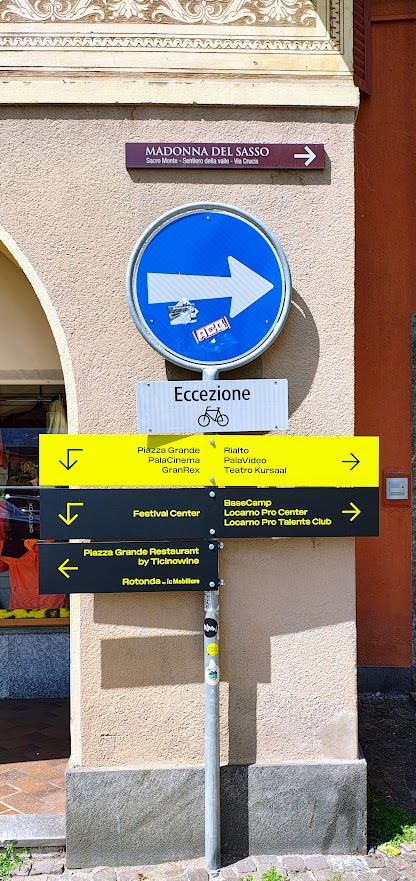
Street sign for festival venues

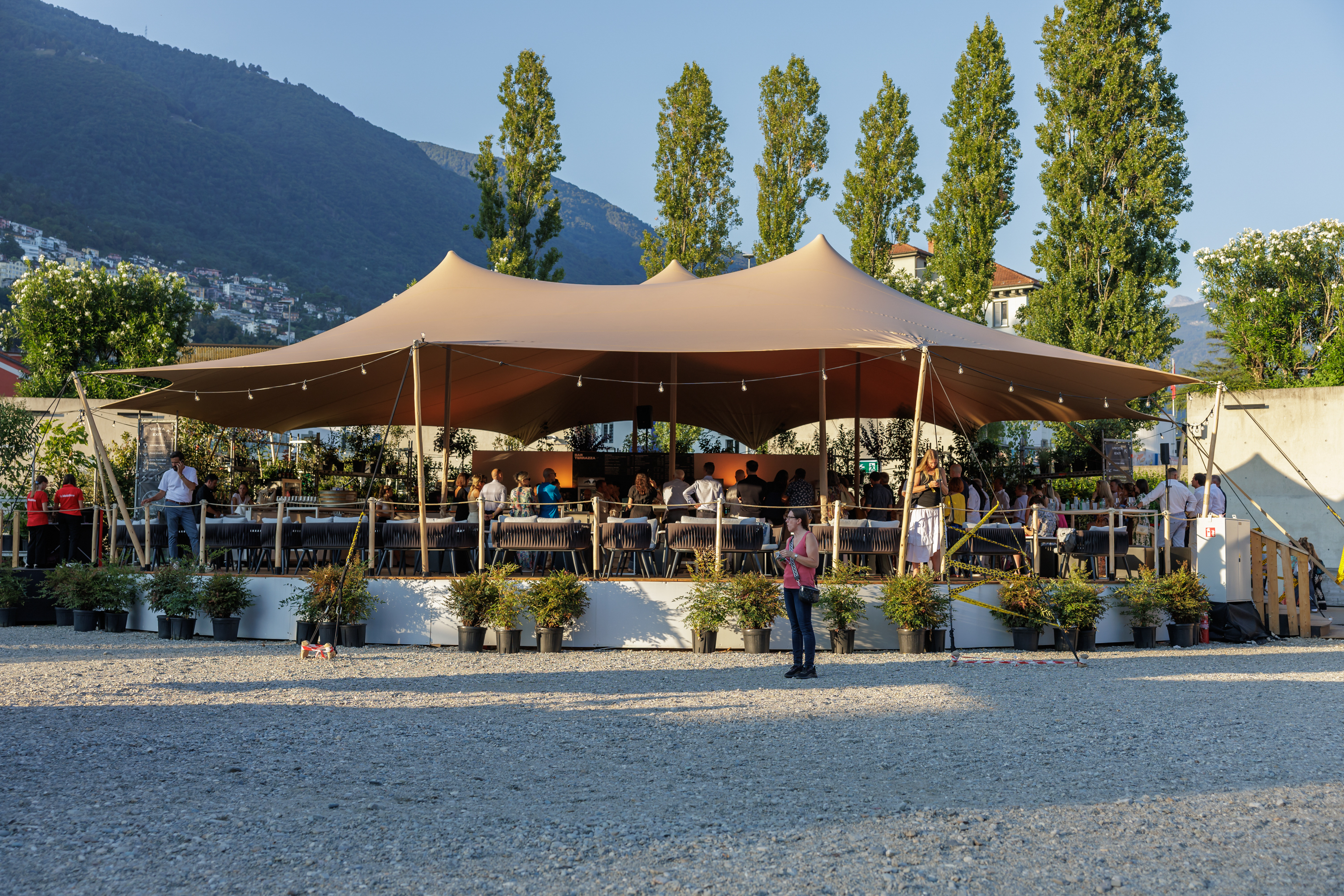
Bar Terraza near Piazza Grande, 2025

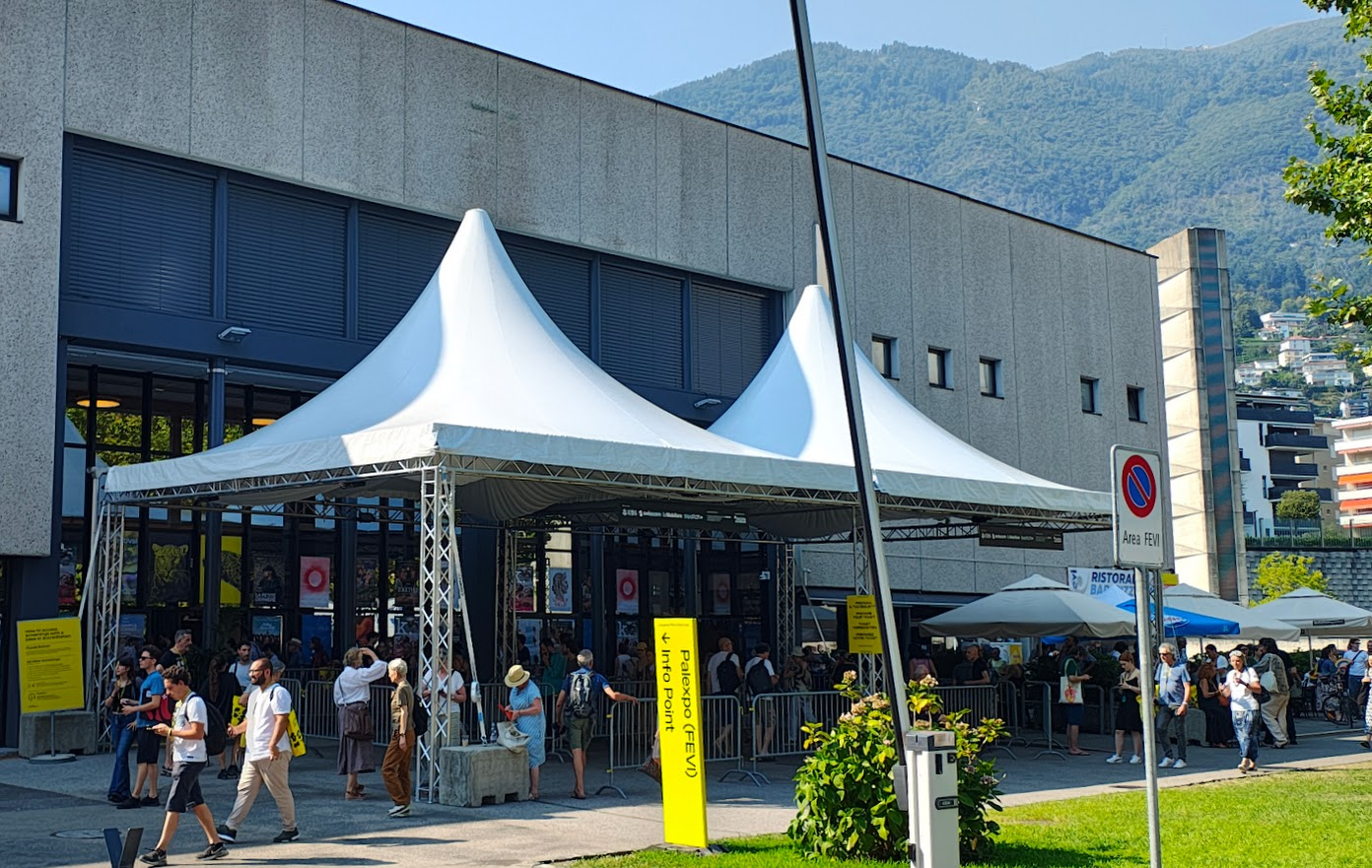
Entrance to "Fevi"

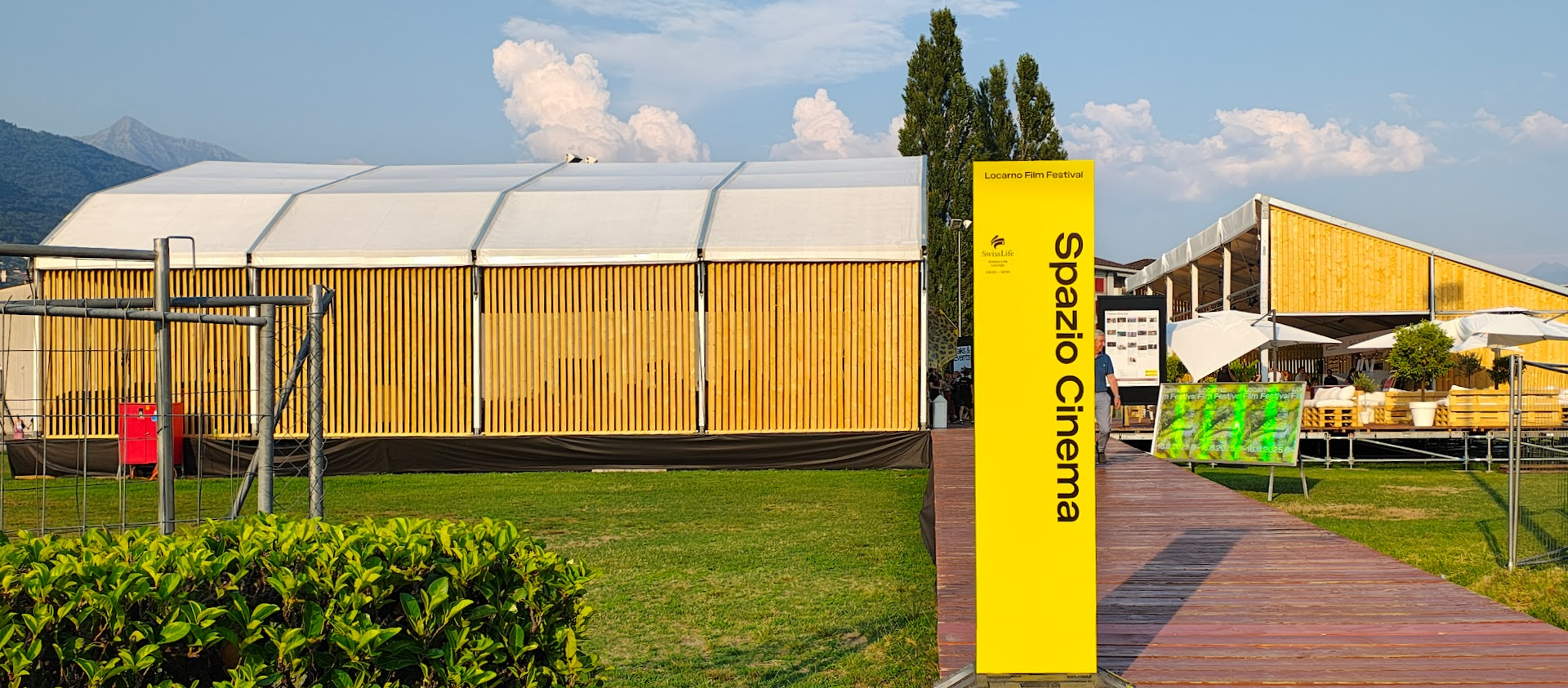
Open air café and interview tent "Spazio"

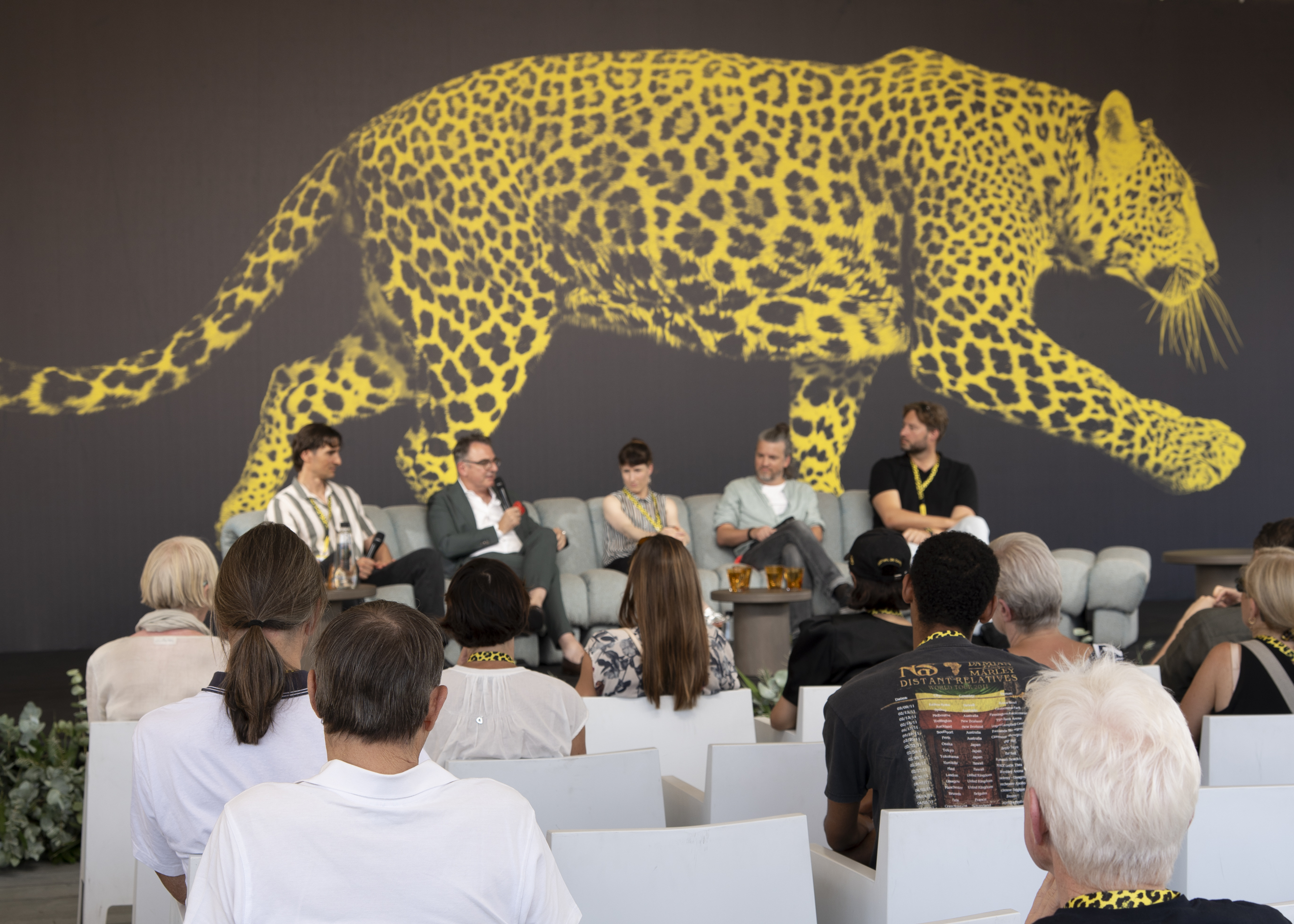
Public talk with filmmakers in "Spazio", 2025

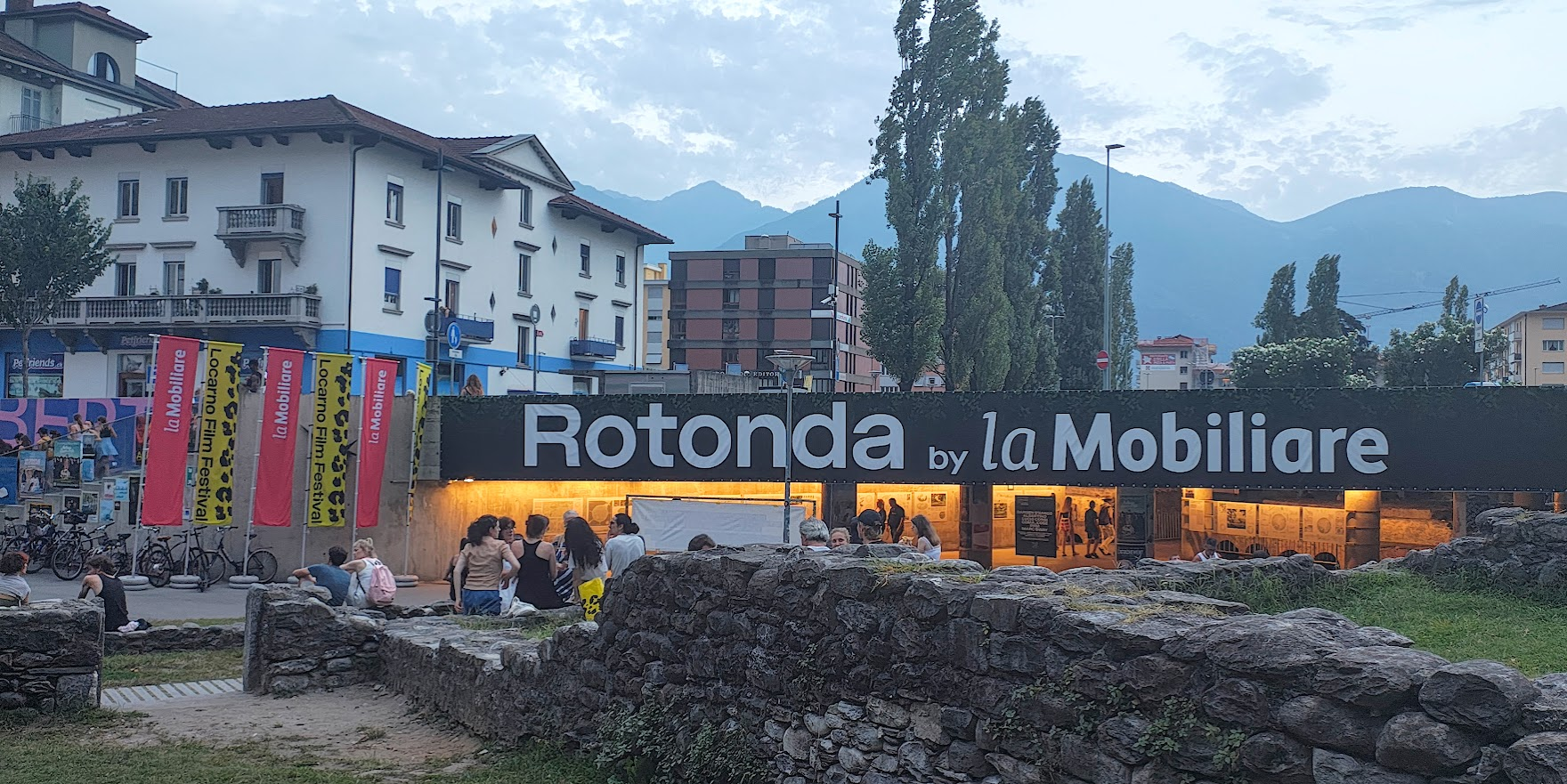
Entrance tunnel to Rotonda

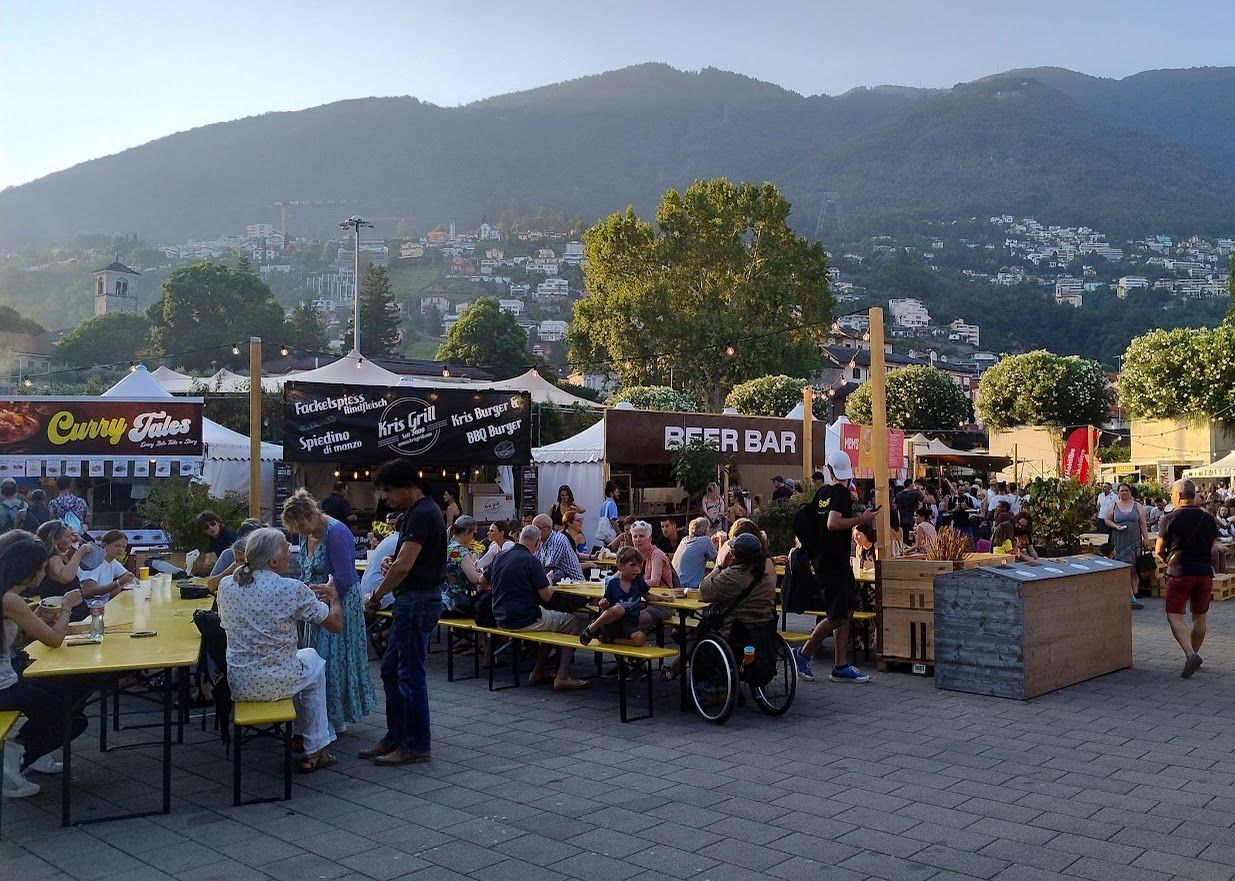
Open air food truck area in Rotonda

== See also ==
- List of film festivals
- List of film festivals in Europe
- List of film awards

== Literature ==
- Cordoba, Cyril (2022). "Between Politics and Economics: The Locarno Film Festival from Tourism to Cinephilia (1946–1972)". Cinergie – Il cinema e le altre arti. 22: 41–53. ISSN 2280-9481.
