= 54th Locarno Film Festival =

Film festival in Locarno, Switzerland

- Opening film: Final Fantasy: The Spirits Within directed by Hironobu Sakaguchi
- Closing film: Moulin Rouge! directed by Baz Luhrmann
- Location: Locarno, Switzerland
- Founded: 1946
- Awards: Golden Leopard: Off to the Revolution by a 2CV directed by Maurizio Sciarra
- Artistic director: Irene Bignardi
- Festival date: Opening: 2 August 2001; Closing: 12 August 2001
- Website: LFF

Locarno Film Festival
- 55th 53rd

The 54th Locarno Film Festival was held from 2 to 12 August 2001 in Locarno, Switzerland. Nineteen films from twelve countries were screened in competition, of which, fifteen were world premieres and nine were directorial debuts. In total, there were 28 world premieres throughout the main three sections of the festival.

The opening film of the festival was Final Fantasy: The Spirits Within directed by Hironobu Sakaguchi. The closing film was Moulin Rouge! directed by Baz Luhrmann. The festival also held the world premiere of Peter Bogdanovich's The Cat's Meow and the European premiere of The Devil's Backbone directed by Guillermo del Toro. The Piazza Grande, the 7,000 seat open-air theater, also featured Tim Burton's Planet of the Apes and Lagaan directed by Ashutosh Gowariker, which won the audience award.

The Leopard of Honor was awarded to Chinese director, Chen Kaige. Special Leopards of Honor were also awarded to two organizations: the Sundance Film Institute and film journal Cahiers du Cinéma. The festival also featured a retrospective called "Out of the Shadows: Asians in American Cinema" that featured over 60 films from the silent to modern era. In the context of festivals, the film magazine Cineaste called it "the first ever attempt to chronicle the history of Asians in American cinema."

This was Irene Bignardi's first year as the festival director following the departure of Marco Mueller. She was previously the film critic for Italian newspaper La Repubblica. She returned the Piazza Grande to its tradition role only featuring out of competition films and expressed a desire to refocus the Filmmakers of the Present into a cohesive section rather than a "grab bag" of film and video.

There was a fight between jury members this year and the winning films were not chosen unanimously. Jurors Luara Morante, and Emilie Deluze, the French director, stormed out in protest during the award press conference. However, this did not effect prizes being awarded.

The Golden Leopard, the festival's top prize, was awarded to Off to the Revolution by a 2CV directed by Maurizio Sciarra. It was the first Italian film to win at the festival in over 20 years.

== Official Jury ==
- Janet Maslin, America film critic for the New York Times, Jury head
- Luara Morante, Italian actress
- Emilie Deluze, French director
- Debra Winger, American actress
- Kerry Fox, New Zealand actress
- Zoe Jenny, Swiss writer
- Ferzan Ozpetek, Italian director
- Antonio Skarmeta, Chilean writer
- Olivia Stewart, British producer

== Official Sections 2001 ==
The following films were screened in these sections:

=== Piazza Grande ===
English Title	Original Title	Director(s)	Year	Production Country
Life on a String	Bian Zou Bian Chang	Chen Kaige	1991	China
Bridget Jones's Diary		Sharon Maguire	2001	Great Britain
The Journey to Kafiristan	Die Reise Nach Kafiristan	Fosco Dubini, Donatello Dubini	2000	Switzerland, Germany
The Devil's Backbone	El Espinazo Del Diablo	Guillermo del Toro	2001	Spain, Mexico
Final Fantasy: The Spirits Within		Hironobu Sakaguchi	2001	USA
Lagaan		Ashutosh Gowariker	2001	India
Miller's Crossing		Joel Coen	1990	USA
Mostly Martha		Sandra Nettelbeck	2000	Germany
Moulin Rouge		Baz Luhrmann	2001	Australia
Planet of the Apes		Tim Burton	2001	USA
Broken Silence	Silencio Roto	Montxo Armendáriz	2001	Spain
The Cat's Meow		Peter Bogdanovich	2001	Great Britain, Germany
The Deep End		Scott McGehee and David Siegel	2001	USA
The Emperor's New Clothes		Alan Taylor	2001	Italia
The Score		Frank Oz	2001	USA
Children's Play	Un Jeu D Enfants	Laurent Tuel	2001	France

=== International Competition ===
English Title	Original Title	Director(s)	Year	Production Country
As a Man	L'afrance	Alain Gomis	2001	France
Baby Boy		John Singleton	2001	USA
Brainstorm	Bicho de 7 Cabeças	Laís Bodanzky	2000	Brazil, Italy
Conjugation	动词变位	Emily Tang	2001	Hong Kong
Delbaran	少年と砂漠のカフェ	Abolfazl Jalili	2001	Japan, Iran
Dervis		Alberto Rondalli	2001	Italy
Guardians of the Earth	Mankolangal	Subrahmanian Santakumar	2000	India
Happiness Is A Warm Gun		Thomas Imbach	2001	Switzerland, Germany
How I Killed My Father	Comment j'ai tué mon père	Anne Fontaine	2001	France, Spain
I'll Wait on You Hand and Foot	Ich Werde Dich Auf Händen Tragen	Iain Dilthey	2000	Germany
It's Not Right	Non è giusto	Antonietta De Lillo	2000	Italy
The Lawless Heart		Tom Hunsinger, Neil Hunter	2001	England
Love the Hard Way		Peter Sehr	2001	USA, Germany
The Milk of Human Kindness	Le Lait de la tendresse humaine	Dominique Cabrera	2001	France
Miss Wonton		Meng Ong	2001	USA
Nabi	나비	Moon Seung-Wook	2001	South Korea
Off to the Revolution by a 2CV	Alla rivoluzione sulla due cavalli	Maurizio Sciarra	2001	Italy
Scheherazade		Riccardo Signorell	2001	Switzerland
Tell Me a Story	Raconte	Guillaume Malandrin	2000	Belgium
With all My Love	Avec Tout Mon Amour	Amalia Escriva	2001	France

=== Filmmakers of the Present ===
==== Video Competition - Filmmakers of the Present ====
Filmmakers of the Present - Video Competition
Original title	English title	Director(s)	Year	Production country
Antes De Amanhã		Saguenail	2001	Portugal
Bonne Nouvelle	Good News	Vincent Dieutre	2001	France
Camera Obscura		Roberto Paci Dalò	2001	Italia
Cuore Di Cane	Dog Heart	Marco Agostinelli	2001	Italia
Die Schöpfer Der Einkaufswelten	The Creators of the Shopping Worlds	Harun Farocki	2001	Germany
Evita Capitana	Avoid Captain	Nicolas Malowicki	2000	Argentina
Il Paese Delle Rane	The Country of Frogs	Alberto Momo	2001	Italia
Jazzwomen		Gabriella Morandi	2001	Italia
Jilltsi		Ilyia Sergeev	2000	Russia
Kya Ka Ra Baa	What is it	Naomi Kawase	2001	Japan
La Strada Nel Bosco	The Road in the Woods	Tonino De Bernardi	2001	Italia
La Voce A Te Dovuta	The Voice Due to you	Jacopo Gassman	2001	Italia
Last Party 2000		Rebecca Chaiklin, Donovan Leitch	2000	USA
Tokyo Gomi-Onna (Love Cinema Vol.1)		Ryūichi Hiroki	2000	Japan
Eri Ni Kubiitake (Love Cinema Vol.2)		Mitsuhiro Mihara	2000	Japan
Tojiru Hi (Love Cinema Vol.3)		Isao Yukisada	2000	Japan
Harikomi (Love Cinema Vol.4)		Tetsuo Shinohara	2000	Japan
Gips (Love Cinema Vol.5)		Akihiko Shiota	2000	Japan
Visitor Q (Love Cinema Vol.6)		Takashi Miike	2000	Japan
Naikor	Neckore	Pablo Trapero	2000	Argentina
Nato		Marco Agostinelli	2001	Italia
Nocní Hovory S Matkou	Night Calls with a Mother	Jan Němec	2001	Czech Republic
Othello: La Tragedie Et Sa Farce	Othello: The Tragedie et Sa Face	Elena Hazanov	2001	Switzerland
Pretty Colors		Amirouche Jesse Alloua	2000	Switzerland
Reykjavík, Des Elfes Dans La Ville	Reykjavík, Elves in the City	Sólveig Anspach	2001	France
Shanghai, Mon Amour, Le Notti Di Mian Mian	Shanghai, Mon Amour, the Nights of Mian Mian	Francesco Conversano, Nene Grignaffini	2001	Italia
The Fourth Dimension		Minh-ha Trinh	2001	Japan, USA
The Fuccon Family		Yoshimasa Ishibashi	2001	Japan
Unfinished Symphony		Bestor Cram, Mike Majoros	2001	USA

Filmmakers of the Present - Out of Competition

Filmmakers of the Present - Out of Competition
Original Title	English Title	Director(s)	Year	Production Country
12		Jean-Pierre Grasset	2001	France, Spain
17 Rue Bleue	17 Blue Rue	Chad Chenouga	2001	France
A Janela (Marialva Mix)		Edgar Pêra	2001	Portugal
Black Box Brd		Andres Veiel	2001	Germany
Cinema De Notre Temps: Aki Kaurismäki	Cinema of Our Time: Aki Kaurismäki	Guy Girard	2000	France
Così È La Vita: Vittorio De Sica	So is Life: Vittorio De Sica	Sandro Lai	2001	Italia
Deja Vu	Leave Vu	Biju Viswanath	2001	India
Die Musik Seid Ihr, Freunde!	You are the Music, Friends!	Andreas Teuchert	1999	Germany
Entre Nous	Between Us	Serge Lalou	2001	France
Glauces: Estudo De Um Rosto	Glauces: Study of a Face	Joel Pizzini	2001	Brazil
Godard A La Tele	Godds are Large	Alexandra Diaz, Michel Royer	2001	France
Hong Kong Cinema		Hubert Niogret	2001	France
Imago (Jours De Folie)	Imago (Days of Madness)	Marie Vermillard	2001	France
Jean-Marie Straub Und Danièle Huillet Bei Der Arbeit An Einem Film Nach Franz Kafkas Amerika	Jean-Marie Straub and Danièle Huillet at Work on a Film to Franz Kafkas America	Harun Farocki	1983	Germany
Kleftis I Pragmatikotita	Thief the Reality	Antoinetta Angelidi	2001	Greece
Lai Man-Wai - Father Of Hong Kong Cinema	I'll be There for You	Choi Kai-Kwong	2001	Hong Kong, China
Le Stade De Wimbledon		Mathieu Amalric	2001	France
Lian Ai Qiyi	Liana IQ I	Shya Wing	2001	Hong Kong
Made In Hong Kong		Giuseppe Baresi	2000	Italia
Mein Stern	My Star	Valeska Grisebach	2001	Austria, Germany
Metropolis		Rintaro	2001	Japan
On The Way		Choi Jae Eun	2000	Japan, Korea
Operai, Contadini	Workers, Peasants	Danièle Huillet, Jean-Marie Straub	2000	Italia, France
Paul Sacher, Portrait Du Mecene En Musicien	Paul Sacher, Portrait of the Mechen in Musician	Edna Politi	2001	Switzerland
Polachromes - Un Taxi Pour Reykjavik	Polachromes - A Taxi for Reykjavik	Damien Peyret	2001	France
Sicilia! Si Gira	Sicily! It Turns	Jean-Charles Fitoussi	2001	France
Siniestro	Sinister	Ernesto McCausland	2001	Colombia
Step By Step		Laurent Merlin	2001	France
Sur La Longueur D Onde De Michael Snow, Zoom Arriere	On the Wavelength of Michael Snow, Rear Zoom	Teri Wehn-Damisch	2001	France
Utolso Vacsora Az Arabs Szürkenel	Last Dinner with Arabs Gray	Miklós Jancsó	2000	Hungary

=== Leopards of Tomorrow ===
Leopards of Tomorrow/ Filmmakers of the Present - Special Program
Original title	English title	Director(s)	Year	Production country
Anna Maria & Kurt/ Lisette/ Robert		Rhéa Meierhans	2001	Switzerland
Cancelli Sull Acqua	Gates on Water	Peter Del Monte	2001	Switzerland
Climax At 2		Laurent Veuve	2001	Switzerland
Das Engadiner Wunder	The Engadine Miracle	Anka Schmid, Tania Stöcklin	2000	Switzerland
Einspruch Ii	Objection II	Rolando Colla	2000	Switzerland
Heidi Island		Laurence Stajic Yaluner	2001	Switzerland
Looking For Rita		Andrea Benzoni	2001	Switzerland
Vivre		Charles Deregnaucourt, Andree Julika Tavares	2000	Switzerland, France

Leopards of Tomorrow (Pardi di Domani)

Leopards of Tomorrow / Belgium
Original Title	English Title	Director(s)	Year	Production Country
Baby-Sitting		Isabelle Bocken	2000	Belgium
Billet Doux	Gentleman	Frauke Dierickx	2000	Belgium
Black Xxx-Mas		Pieter Van Hees	1999	Belgium
Buiten Adem	Out of Breath	Anke Blondé	1999	Belgium
Bxl Minuit	BXL Midnight	Dorothée Van den Berghe	1999	Belgium
Chambre Froide	Cold Room	Olivier Masset-Depasse	2000	Belgium
De Aanspreker	The Speaker	Geoffrey Enthoven	1999	Belgium
Echo		Frédéric Roullier-Gall	1999	Belgium
Ex.# Nâ°1870-4	Out. # N ° 1870-4	Christophe Van Rompaey	2000	Belgium
Framing And Unframing		Peter Connelly	2000	Belgium
Heure H	Hour h	David No	1999	Belgium
Inasmuch		Wim Vandekeybus	2000	Belgium
Joyeux Noël Rachid	Merry Christmas Rachid	Sam Garbanski	2000	Belgium
Kampvuur	Campfire	Bavo Defurne	2000	Belgium
L'Héritier	The Heir	Philippe de Pierpont	1999	Belgium
La Grimace	Grimace	Jacques Donjean	2001	Belgium
Mireille Et Lucien	Mireille and Lucien	Philippe Blasband	2001	Belgium
Muno	Inside Here	Bouli Lanners	2001	Belgium
Premier Amour	First Love	Bernard Garant	2001	Belgium
Real Men Eat Meat		Maria Von Heland	1999	Belgium, Sweden
Surveiller Les Tortues	Turtle	Inès Rabadan	1999	Belgium
The Thread		Lieven Van Baelen, Jan de Coster	2000	Belgium
Tout Ira Mieux Desormais	Everything will be Better	Christof Wagner		Belgium
Tribu	Tribe	Joachim Lafosse	2001	Belgium
Un Veau Pleurait, La Nuit	A Calf Was Crying at Night	John Shank	2000	Belgium
Walking On The Wild Side		Dominique Abel, Fiona Gordon	2000	Belgium
Wooww		Fien Troch	1999	Belgium
Belgium - Retrospective
Aaah		Vincent Bierrewaerts	2000	Belgium
Ad Vitam Aeternam - A Perpet	To Eternal Life - a Perpetual	Jak Boon	1978	Belgium
Alechinsky D Après Nature	Alechinsky from Nature	Luc de Heusch	1970	Belgium
Arthur		Guionne Leroy	1998	Belgium
Bzz	Outfit	Benoît Feroumont	2000	Belgium
Charlotje	Charlot	Lien Willaert	1998	Belgium
Chiome D Oro	Gold Hair	Klaartje Schrijvers	1993	Belgium
Combat De Boxe	Boxing Fight	Charles Dekeukeleire	1927	Belgium
Dear Jean-Claude		Willem Wallyn	1998	Belgium
Dimanche	Sunday	Edmond Bernhard	1962	Belgium
Griekse Tragedie	Greek Tragedy	Nicole Vangoethem	1985	Belgium
Harpya		Raoul Servais	1979	Belgium
Il Court... Il Court Le Monde	He Runs ... He Runs the World	Luc et Jean-Pierre Dardenne	1987	Belgium
Images D'Ostende	Ostend Images	Henri Storck	1930	Belgium
In Vino Veritas	In the Wine Truth	Manu Gomez	1998	Belgium
Jour De Congé	Day Off	Carole Laganière	1989	Belgium
Just To Be A Part Of It		Geert Vangoethem	1995	Belgium
La Carte Postale	The Postcard	Vivian Gofette	1997	Belgium
La Complainte Du Progrès	The Complaint of Progress	Claudio Pazienza	1998	Belgium
La Dame Dans Le Tram	The Lady in the Tram	Jean-Philippe Laroche	1993	Belgium
La Fête Des Mères	Mother's Day	Chris Vander Stappen	1999	Belgium
Le Cheval De Fer	The Iron Horse	Gérald Frydman, Pierre Levie	1994	Belgium
Le Rouge, Le Rouge, Le Rouge	Red, Red, Red	Jean-Jacques Andrien	1972	Belgium
Le Réveil	The Alarm Clock	Marc-Henri Wajnberg	1996	Belgium
Le Signaleur	The Signaller	Benoît Mariage	1997	Belgium
Le Trieur	The Sorter	Philippe Boon, Laurent Brandenbourger	1993	Belgium
Leon G.		André Chandelle	1994	Belgium
Lili Et Le Loup	Lili and the Wolf	Florence Henrard	1997	Belgium
Lis Tes Ratures	Read your Erasures	Guy Pirotte	1982	Belgium
Los Taxios	The Taxia	Lars Damoiseaux	1998	Belgium
Léonie	Leonie	Lieven Debrauwer	1996	Belgium
Menteur	Liar	Damien de Pierpont	1996	Belgium
Miroir D'Ailleurs	Mirror Elsewhere	Willy Kempeneers	1986	Belgium
Monsieur Plateau	Mr. Plateau	Jean Brismée	1964	Belgium
Onder De Wassende Maan	Under the Racing Moon	Hans Spilliaert	1994	Belgium
Overkant	Upper Edge	Herman Wuyts	1968	Belgium
Phalloctère	Phallocter	Manuel Gomez	1998	Belgium
Pic Pic Andrè Shoow-4-1		Stéphane Aubier, Vincent Patar	1999	Belgium
Saint		Bavo Defurne	1996	Belgium
Saute Ma Ville	Jump My City	Chantal Akerman	1968	Belgium
Saïda A Enlevé Manneken-Pis	Saïda Removed Manneken-Pis	Alfred Machin	1913	Belgium
Scarabus		Gérald Frydman	1971	Belgium
Seuls	Only	Thierry Knauff, Olivier Smolders	1989	Belgium
Sirènes	Sirens	Emile Degelin	1961	Belgium
Surfing		Stijn Coninx	1982	Belgium
The Bloody Olive		Vincent Bal	1996	Belgium
The Sugar Bowl		Hilde Van Mieghem	1997	Belgium
Ti Amo	I Love you	Frank Van passel	1990	Belgium
To Speak		Erik Lamens	1998	Belgium
È Pericoloso Sporgersi	It is Dangerous to Lean	Jaco Van Dormael	1984	Belgium
Swiss Confederation
Crevetten	Shrimp	Petra Volpe	2001	Switzerland, Germany
Das Cello		Thomas Isler	2001	Switzerland
Deux	Two	Franz Josef Holzer	2000	Switzerland
Die Wurstverkäuferin	The Sausage Seller	Stefan Hillebrand, Oliver Paulus	2001	Switzerland, Germany
Frédéric		Ivo Zen	2001	Switzerland
Int. Hôtel Nuit	Int. Hotel Night	Elena Hazanov	2001	Switzerland
Josephines Reise	Josephine's Journey	Matthias Dietiker	2001	Switzerland
L'Apprentissage	Learning	Fernand Melgar	2001	Switzerland
Mais Où Est Donc Passée Ma Vie?	But where Did My Life Go?	Jean-Laurent Chautems	2000	Switzerland
Quid Pro Quo	What is the Place where	Jérome Bellavista Caltagirone	2000	Switzerland, Italia
Reise Ohne Rückkehr	Travel without Return	Esen Isik	2000	Switzerland
Sjeki Vatcsh !	See Vatcsh!	Thomas Ott	2001	Switzerland
Strip Dog		Delphine Vaucher	2001	Switzerland
Tous À Table	All at the Table	Ursula Meier	2001	Switzerland, Belgium
Un Oiseau Dans Le Plafond	A Bird in the Ceiling	Cèline Macherel	2001	Switzerland, France
Viaje En Taxi	Taxi Trip	Nico Gutmann	2001	Switzerland

=== Tribute To ===
Tribute To – Anne-Marie Blanc
Original Title	English Title	Director(s)	Year	Production Country
Die Missbrauchten Liebesbriefe	The Abused Love Letters	Leopold Lindtberg	1940	Switzerland
La Petite Gilberte - Anne Marie Blanc, Schauspielerin	La Petite Gilberte - Anne Marie Blanc, Actress	Anne Cuneo	2001	Switzerland
Tribute To – Michel Soutter
La Lune Avec Les Dents	The Moon with Teeth	Michel Soutter	1966	Switzerland

=== Italian Peplum (Le péplum à l'italienne) ===
Original Title	English Title	Director(s)	Year	Production Country
Arrivano I Titani	My Son, the Hero	Duccio Tessari	1961	Italia
Cabiria		Giovanni Pastrone	1914	Italia
Ercole Al Centro Della Terra	Hercules in the Center of the Earth	Mario Bava	1961	Italia
Il Colosso Di Rodi	The Rhodes Giant	Sergio Leone	1960	Italia, France
Il Figlio Di Spartacus	The Slave	Sergio Corbucci	1962	Italia
Le Fatiche Di Ercole	The Labors of Hercules	Pietro Francisci	1957	Italia
Le Legioni Di Cleopatra	The Legions of Cleopatra	Vittorio Cottafavi	1959	France, Italia
Maciste All Inferno		Riccardo Freda	1962	
Scipione L Africano		Carmine Gallone	1937	Italia
Ulisse	Ulysses	Mario Camerini	1954	Italia, USA

=== Outside the Shadows – Asians In American Cinema ===
Outside the Shadows: Asians In American Cinema
Original Title	English Title	Director(s)	Year	Production Country
Aka Don Bonus		Spencer Nakasako, Sokly Ny	1998	USA
American Sons		Steven Okazaki	1994	USA
Anna May Wong Visits Shanghai		WONG Hai-sheng	1936	
Apotheosis		John Lennon, Yoko Ono	1970	
Asian Boys		Angel Velasco Shaw	1994	
Behind the Rising Sun		Edward Dmytryk	1943	USA
The Bitter Tea of General Yen		Frank Capra	1933	USA
Bontoc Eulogy		Marlon E. Fuentes	1995	USA
Bridge to the Sun		Etienne Périer	1961	France, USA
Chan Is Missing		Wayne Wang	1982	USA
Charlie Chan In Shanghai		James Tinling	1935	USA
China Doll		Frank Borzage	1958	USA
China Girl		Abel Ferrara	1987	USA
Chinese Box Home Movie		Wayne Wang	1997	USA
Cigarettes & Coffee The Jerry Garcia Band				
Come See the Paradise		Alan Parker	1990	USA
Confessions of an Opium Eater		Albert Zugsmith	1962	USA
Dangerous to Know		Robert Florey	1938	USA
Daughter of the Dragon		Lloyd Corrigan	1931	USA
Days of Waiting: The Life & Art of Estelle Ishigo		Steven Okazaki	1990	USA
Die Xue Jie Tou	Die X UE J IE Zone T	John Woo	1990	Hong Kong
Dim Sum Take-Out		Wayne Wang	1985	USA
Double Team		Tsui Hark	1997	USA
Eat a Bowl of Tea		Wayne Wang	1989	USA
Film No.5 (Smile)		Yoko Ono	1968	USA
Flower Drum Song		Henry Koster	1961	USA
Forbidden City, Usa		Arthur Dong	1990	USA
Forfaiture	Forfeit		1937	France
Freckled Rice		Stephen C. Ning	1983	USA
Go for Broke!		Robert Pirosh	1951	USA
History and Memory: For Akiko and Takashige		Rea Tajiri	1990	
House of Bamboo		Samuel Fuller	1955	
Hunting Tigers		Steven Okazaki	1988	USA
Japanese War Bride		King Vidor	1952	USA
Life Is Cheap But Toilet Paper Is Expensive		Spencer Nakasako, Wayne Wang	1990	USA
Meng Long Guojiang	M Long G UO will	Bruce Lee	1972	Hong Kong
Mother/Land		Ming Ma	2000	
My America or Honk if You Love Buddha		Renee Tajima-Peña	1996	USA
My Geisha		Jack Cardiff	1962	USA
None but the Brave		Frank Sinatra	1965	USA
Picture Bride		Kayo Hatta	1994	
Picturing Oriental Girls		Valerie Soe	1992	
Rabbit in the Moon		Emiko Omori	1999	USA
Ride with the Devil		Ang Lee	1999	USA
Sea in the Blood		Fung	2000	
Sex, Love and Kung Fu		Kip Fulbeck	2001	USA
Slamdance Short Cut		Wayne Wang	1985	USA
Slaying the Dragon		Deborah Gee	1988	
Sniff		Ming Ma	1997	
Thank You, Mr Moto		Norman Foster	1937	USA
The Bottle Imp		Marshall A. Neilan	1917	USA
The Cheat		Cecil B. DeMille	1915	USA
The Crimson Kimono		Samuel Fuller	1959	USA
The Dragon Painter		William Worthington	1919	USA
The Good Earth		Sidney Franklin	1937	USA
The Joy Luck Club		Wayne Wang	1993	USA
The Living End		Gregg Araki	1992	USA
The Mask Of Fu Manchu		Charles Brabin	1932	USA
The Toll Of The Sea		Chester M. Franklin	1922	USA
The World Of Suzie Wong		Richard Quine	1960	USA
Three Exit		Selena Chang	2001	USA
Two Virgins		John Lennon, Yoko Ono	1968	USA
Umbilical Cord		Angel Velasco Shaw	1998	
Windtalkers				

== Independent Sections ==
=== Critics Week ===
The Semaine de la Critique is an independent section, created in 1990 by the Swiss Association of Film Journalists in partnership with the Locarno Film Festival.

Original Title	English Title	Director(s)	Year	Production Country
Der Weisse Wal	The White Whale	Stephan Koestler		Germany, Netherlands
Meier 19		Erich Schmid	2001	Switzerland
Missing Allen	Missing all	Christian Bauer	2001	Germany
Orlan, Carnal Art		Stephen Oriach	2001	France
Promises		Justine Shapiro	2001	USA, Palestine
Rabelados - Die Gewaltlosen Rebellen Der Kap Verdischen Inseln	Rabelados - The Non -Violent Rebels of the Cape Verar Islands	Ana Rocha Fernandez, Torsten Truscheit	2000	Germany, Cape Verde
Venus Boyz		Gabriel Baur	2001	Switzerland, USA

=== Swiss Cinema ===
Swiss Cinema Rediscovered
Original Title	English Title	Director(s)	Year	Production Country
Bergführer Lorenz	Mountain Guide Lorenz	Eduard Probst	1942	Switzerland
En Syrie	In Syria		1922	
Le Cirque De La Mort	The Circus of Death	Alfred Lind		Switzerland
Samaden (Engadine). L Approche Du Printemps Est Bruyamment Fêtée	Samaden (Engadine). the Approach of Spring is Noisily Celebrated			
Sur Le Tournage De Bergführer Lorenz			1942	
Von Pontresina, Oberengadin, Nach Bernina Hospiz	From Pontresina, Oberengadin, to Bernina Hospiz			

=== Appellation Swiss ===
Original Title	English Title	Director(s)	Year	Production Country
Big Mac Small World		Peter Guyer	2000	Switzerland
Birthday		Stefan Jäger	2001	Switzerland, Germany
Das Fähnlein Der Sieben Aufrechten	The Flag of the Seven Upright	Simon Aeby	2001	Switzerland
Gripsholm		Xavier Koller	2000	Switzerland, Germany
Heidi		Markus Imboden	2001	Switzerland
Joy Ride (Dogma 14)		Martin Rengel	2000	Switzerland
Varlin		Friedrich Kappeler	2000	Switzerland
Yugodivas		Andrea Štaka	2000	Switzerland

== Official Awards ==
=== International Competition ===
- Golden Leopard: Off to the Revolution by a 2CV directed by Maurizio Sciarra
- Silver Leopard: Love The Hard Way directed by Peter Sehr, L’AFRANCE directed by Alain Gomis
- Bronze Leopard: Ho-Jung Kim in NABI directed by Moon Seung-Wook, Antonio Garcia in ALLA RIVOLUZIONE SULLA DUE CAVALLI directed by Maurizio Sciarra
- Special Prize, official Jury: Delbaran directed by Abolfazi Jalili
- Special Mention, Official Jury: Baby Boy directed by John Singleton, Dong Ci Bian Wei directed by TONG Hiu Park (Emily Tang), Le Lait De La Tendresse Humaine directed by Dominique Cabrera, The Lawless Heart directed by Tom Hunsinger and Neil Hunter

=== Piazza Grande ===
- Prix du Public UBS: Lagaan directed by Ashutosh Gowariker

=== Leopards of Tomorrow Competition ===
- Golden Leopard, SRG SSR idée Suisse Prize and Egli Film Prize, New Swiss Talents, Leopards of Tomorrow, (Short Films): Deux directed by Franz Josef Holzer
- Silver Leopard, Eastman Kodak Company Prize, New Swiss Talents, Leopards of Tomorrow, (Short Films): Tous À TABLE directed by Ursula Meier
- “Action Light” Prize, New Swiss Talents, Leopards of Tomorrow, (Short Films): Crevetten directed by Petra Volpe
- Film und Video Subtitling Prize, New Swiss Talents, Leopards of Tomorrow, (Short Films): Reise Ohne RÜCKKEHR directed by Esen Isik

=== “Cinema e Gioventù” – Leopards of Tomorrow Jury ===
- Special Mention, New Swiss Talents, Leopards of Tomorrow, (Short Films): Viaje En Taxi directed by Nico Gutmann
- Golden Leopard, SRG SSR Idée Suisse Prize, Belgian Films, Leopards of Tomorrow, (Short Films): Chambre Froide directed by Olivier Masset-Depasse
- Silver Leopard, Eastman Kodak Company Prize, Belgian Films, Leopards of Tomorrow, (Short Films): The Thread directed by Jan de Coster and Lieven Van Baelen
- Special Mention, Belgian Films, Leopards of Tomorrow, (Short Films): Tribu directed by Joachim Lafosse
- Youth Jury Prize, New Swiss Talents, Short Films: Tous À TABLE directed by Ursula Meier
- Special Mention, Youth Jury, New Swiss Talents, Short Films: Josephines Reise directed by Matthias Dietiker
- Youth Jury Prize, New Belgian Talents, Short Films: Raconte directed by Guillaume Malandrin

=== Video Competition Jury ===
- Golden Leopard, Sony Prize: NOCNÍ HOVORY S MATKOU directed by Jan Nemec
- Special Mention, Video Jury: Bonne Nouvelle directed by Vincent Dieutre

=== Ecumenical Jury ===
- Oecumenical Jury Prize: L’AFRANCE directed by Alain Gomis
- Special Prize, Oecumenical Jury: Promises directed by Justine Shapiro

=== FIPRESCI Jury ===
- FIPRESCI Prize: Miss Wonton directed by Meng Ong

=== CICAE – Art & Essai Award Jury ===
- CICAE Prize: The Lawless Heart directed by Tom Hunsinger and Neil Hunter
- Special Mention, CICAE Jury: Alla Rivoluzione Sulla Due Cavalli directed by Maurizio Sciarra

=== Youth Jury ===
- First Prize, Youth Jury: Alla Rivoluzione Sulla Due Cavalli directed by Maurizio Sciarra
- Second Prize, Youth Jury: Bicho De 7 CABEÇAS directed by Laís Bodanzky
- Third Prize, Youth Jury: Delbaran directed by Abolfazi Jalili
- “The environnement is the quality of life” Prize”: Nabi directed by Moon Seung-Wook
- “Euro>26” Prize: L’AFRANCE directed by Alain Gomis
- Special Mention, Youth Jury: Dervis directed by Alberto Rondalli, The Lawless Heart directed by Tom Hunsinger and Neil Hunter

=== FICC Jury ===
- Don Quijote Prize: Delbaran directed by Abolfazi Jalili
- Special Mention, FICC Jury: The Lawless Heart directed by Tom Hunsinger and Neil Hunter

=== SRG SSR idée suisse | Semain de la critique Award ===
- SRG SSR idée Suisse Prize, Critics Week: Venus Boyz directed by Gabriel Baur
- Special Mention, Critics Week Jury: Rabelados – DIE GEWALTLOSEN REBELLEN DER KAP VERDISCHEN INSELN directed by Ana Rocha Fernandez and Torsten Truscheit
