= 55th Locarno Film Festival =

Film festival in Locarno, Switzerland

- Opening film: The Importance of Being Ernest directed by Oliver Parker
- Closing film: Possession directed by Neil LaBute
- Location: Locarno, Switzerland
- Founded: 1946
- Awards: Golden Leopard: The Longing directed by Iain Dilthey
- Artistic director: Irene Bignardi
- Festival date: Opening: 1 August 2002; Closing: 11 August 2002
- Website: LFF

Locarno Film Festival
- 56th 54th

The 55th Locarno Film Festival was held from 1 to 11 August 2002 in Locarno, Switzerland. Films from 30 countries were shown at the festival. The opening film was The Importance of Being Ernest directed by Oliver Parker. Shown on the Piazza Grande, the 7,000-seat open-air theater, the closing film of the festival was the world premiere of Possession directed by Neil LaBute. The Leopard of Honor was awarded to American actor and director Sydney Pollack, who flew himself to Locarno as co-pilot in his own personal plane.

The festival also held the European premiere of M. Night Shyamalan's Signs and Christopher Nolan's Insomnia. Other noteworthy films at the festival were Secretary directed by Steven Shainberg and Gus Van Sant's Gerry in competition. All films screened on the Piazza Grande were world or international premieres.

A sections were held for Indian films called "Indian Summer" and another for films from Afghanistan called "Afghan Day", which was attended by the Afghani Culture Minister and featured some films that made in secret under the Taliban. Director Peter Bogdanovich also presented a retrospective of filmmaker Allan Dwan.

The Golden Leopard, the festival's top prize, was awarded to The Longing directed by Iain Dilthey.

== Official Jury ==
- Cedomir Kolar, Serbian producer, Jury head
- Bruno Ganz, Swiss actor
- Aamir Khan, Indian actor producer
- Emanuel Levy, American film critic
- Jafar Panahi, Iranian director
- Niloufar Pazira, Afghan-Canadian director and actress
- Bela Tarr, Hungarian director

== Official sections ==
The following films were screened in these sections:

=== Piazza Grande ===
The Piazza Grande is the 7,000-seat open-air theater built each year in the town square. All films screened on the Piazza Grande this year were world or international premieres.

Original Title	English Title	Director(s)	Year	Production Country
Ali G Indahouse		Mark Mylod	2002	Great Britain
Bend It Like Beckham		Gurinder Chadha	2002	USA, Great Britain
Birdseye		Stephen Beckner, Mike Huber	2002	Switzerland, USA
Corto Maltese , La Cour Secrète Des Arcanes	Corto Maltese, the Secret Courtyard of Mysteries	Pascal Morelli	2002	France, Italia
Dead Or Alive: Final		Takashi Miike	2001	Japan
Hommage À Positif: L'Armata Brancaleone	Hommage to Positif: For Love and Gold	Mario Monicelli	1966	Italia
Insomnia		Christopher Nolan	2002	USA
L'Idole	The Idol	Samantha Lang	2002	France
My Little Eye		Marc Evans	2001	Great Britain
Novo		Jean-Pierre Limosin	2002	France, Switzerland
Passage		Shirin Neshat	2001	USA
Possession		Neil LaBute	2002	USA
Signs		M. Night Shyamalan	2002	USA
The Bourne Identity		Doug Liman	2002	USA, Czech Republic
The Importance of Being Earnest		Oliver Parker	2002	Great Britain, USA
They Shoot Horses, Don't They?		Sydney Pollack	1969	USA
Oligarch	Tycoon	Pavel Lounguine	2002	France, Russia

=== International Competition ===
Original Title	English Title	Director(s)	Year	Production Country
Aime Ton Père	Love your Father	Jacob Berger	2002	France, Switzerland
Al Primo Soffio Di Vento	To the First Breath of Wind	Franco Piavoli	2002	Italia
Blue Moon		Andrea Maria Dusl	2002	Austria
Das Verlangen	The Longing	Iain Dilthey	2002	Germany
Diskoli Apocheretismi: O Babas Mou	Difficult Expression: My Pope	Penny Panayotopoulou	2002	Greece, Germany
Gerry		Gus Van Sant	2001	USA
La Cage	The Cage	Alain Raoust	2002	France
Ma Vraie Vie À Rouen	My Real Life in Rouen	Olivier Ducastel, Jacques Martineau	2002	France
Man, Taraneh, Panzdah Sal Daram	Man, Taranheh, Panzdah Sal Daram	Rassul Sadr Ameli	2002	Iran
Meisje	Girl	Dorothée Van den Berghe	2002	Belgium, Netherlands
Mr. and Mrs. Iyer		Aparna Sen	2002	India
Okay		Jesper W. Nielsen	2001	Denmark
Oltre Il Confine	Beyond the Border	Rolando Colla	2002	Switzerland, Italia
One Hour Photo		Mark Romanek	2002	USA
Personal Velocity: Three Portraits		Rebecca Miller	2001	USA
René		Alain Cavalier	2002	France
Revengers Tragedy		Alex Cox	2001	Great Britain
Secretary		Steven Shainberg	2002	USA
Sophiiiie!		Michael Hofmann	2002	Germany
Szép Napok	Nice Days	Kornél Mundruczó	2002	Hungary
Tan De Repente	So Suddenly	Diego Lerman	2002	Argentina
Xiang Ji Mao Yi Yang Fei		MENG Jing Hui	2002	China

=== Filmmakers of the Present ===
Filmmakers of the Present / In Progress

Original Title	English Title	Director(s)	Year	Production Country
Aurevoiretmerci		Arnold Pasquier	2001	France
Two Michel Snow		Arnold Pasquier	2002	France

Filmmakers of the Present / Out of Competition

Original Title	English Title	Director(s)	Year	Production Country
Aleph Bay-E Afgan		Mohsen Makhmalbaf	2002	Iran
Berlin. Die Sinfonie Der Grosstadt	Berlin: Symphony of a Metropolis	Walter Ruttmann, Thomas Schadt	1927	Germany
Cuore Napoletano	Neapolitan Heart	Paolo Santoni	2002	Italia
Derrida		Kirby Dick, Amy Ziering Kofman	2002	USA
Después De La Evasion	After the Evasion	Antonio Llorens	2002	Spain
Essen, Schlafen, Keine Frauen	Eating, Sleeping, No Women	Heiner Stadler	2002	Germany
Etrangère	Stradder	Danielle Arbid	2002	France
Hoover Street Revival		Sophie Fiennes	2002	Great Britain, France
Il Salumificio	The Salami Factory	Alessandra Tantillo	2002	Italia
Jour De Marché	Market Day	Jacqueline Veuve	2002	Switzerland
Keep In Touch		Jean-Claude Rousseau	1987	France
L'Acqua In Mezzo	Water in the Middle	Daria Menozzi	2002	Italia
L'Impatience	Impatience	Antoine Fumat	2002	France
L'Implacabile Tenente Rossi	The Relentless Lieutenant Rossi	Francesco Calogero	2002	Italia
Le Bruit, L Odeur Et Quelques Étoiles	Noise, Smell and some Stars	Eric Pittard	2002	France, Belgium
Le Nom Du Feu	Fire Name	Eugène Green	2002	France
Les Guerriers De La Beauté	Beauty Warriors	Pierre Coulibeuf	2002	France, Belgium
Les Jours Où Je N'Existe Pas	The Days when I Do not Exist	Jean-Charles Fitoussi	2002	France
Lettre A Roberto	Letre to Roberto	Jean-Claude Rousseau	2002	France
Lost Paradise		Pierre Coulibeuf	2002	France
Mage Wam Atha	Mage Wam Atha aka Pickpocket (My Left Hand)	Linton Semage	2002	Sri Lanka
My Room Le Grand Canal		Anne-Sophie Brabant, Pierre Gerbaux	2002	France
Nikita Kino	The Plane that Came to	Vivian Ostrovsky	2002	France
Provisoires Amis	PROVIREMENTS	Jacques Meilleurat	2002	France
Ricco	Rich	Mike Wildbolz	2002	Switzerland
Ritratti Luigi Meneghello	Portraits Luigi Meneghello	Carlo Mazzacurati, Marco Paolini	2002	Italia
Royal Bonbon	Royal Bobs	Charles Najman	2001	France, Canada
Ruzegar-E Ma		Rakhshān Banietemad	2002	Iran
Réalisations	Achievements	Arnold Pasquier		France
Slepa Pega	Blind Spot	Hanna Slak	2002	Slovenia
Todo Juntos	All Together	Federico León	2002	Argentina
Wanted		Kim Hopkins	2002	Great Britain
Yok Mang	No Mang	Eungsu Kim	2002	Korea
Yönden	As Far as	Marie Jaoul de Poncheville	2002	France
Zappaterra		César Meneghetti, Elisabetta Pandimiglio	2002	Italia
Zur Lage	To the Situation		2002	Austria

Filmmakers of the Present / Video

Original Title	English Title	Director(s)	Year	Production Country
Amandla! A Revolution In Four Part Harmony		Lee Hirsch	2002	Central African Republic
Antologia Opere Di Cioni Carpi	Anthology Works by Cioni Carpi	Cioni Carpi		Italia
Antologia Opere Di Luigi Veronesi	Anthology Works by Luigi Veronesi	Luigi Veronesi		Italia
Arundhati Roy		Paolo Brunatto, Angelo Fontana	2002	Italia
Asir Va Entezar	I Am Waiting for	Mohammad Ahmadi	2002	Iran
Beacon		Christoph Girardet, Matthias Müller	2002	Germany, Portugal
Bernardo Bertolucci: A Cosa Serve Il Cinema?	Bernardo Bertolucci: What is the Cinema For?	Sandro Lai	2001	Italia
Biggie & Tupac		Nick Broomfield	2001	Great Britain
Ciudad De Maria	Maria City	Enrique Bellande	2001	Argentina
Contes Politiques 2: Interpretations	Political Tales 2: Interpretations	Pierre Borker	2002	France
Dam Nations: Damage		Arundhati Roy	2002	Great Britain
Diam S		Keja Ho Kramer	2002	France
Dieci Minuti Alla Fine	Ten Minutes at the End	Daniele Ciprì, Franco Maresco	2002	Italia, Portugal
Dieci Racconti In Una Stanza-Delusione	Ten Stories in a Room-Delusion	Nuccio Ambrosino	2001	Italia
Don Vitaliano		Paolo Pisanelli	2002	Italia
Happy Too		Thomas Imbach	2002	Switzerland
Heaven S Crossroad		Kimi Takesue	2002	USA
Kalkitos	Limestone	Miguel Gomes	2002	Portugal
L'Orfano	The Orphan	Oliviero Toscani	2002	Italia
Les Treize Vies Du Chat Lelouch	The Thirteen Lives of the Cat Lelouch	Isabelle Clarke	2002	France
Mario Monicelli, L'Artigiano Di Viareggio	Mario Monicelli, the Craftsman of Viareggio	Marco Cucurnia	2001	Italia
Nyde	Enjoy	Salvatore Lista	2002	France
Rax		Roberto Paci Daló	2001	Italia
Remains		Sandro Aguilar	2002	Portugal
Sem Terra	Landless	Pasquale Scimeca, Roberto Torelli	2002	Italia
Tambours Sur La Digue	Drum on the Dike	Ariane Mnouchkine	2002	France
Viet Nam	Vietnam	Yervant Gianikian, Angela Ricci Lucchi	2002	Italia
Voz	Voice	Goran Kostic	2002	Yugoslavia
Vse Vertovy	All Helicopters	Vladimir Nepevniy	2001	Russia

=== Leopards of Tomorrow ===
Leopards of Tomorrow (Pardi di Domani)

Australia / New Zealand
Original Title	English Title	Director(s)	Year	Production Country
A Telephone Call For Genevieve Snow		Peter Long	2002	Australia
Bowl Me Over		Angie Black	2001	Australia
Confessions Of A Headhunter		Sally Riley	2000	Australia
Cow		Michael Bennett	2001	New Zealand
Dancing In The Dust		Jenny Kendall	2002	Australia
Delivery Day		Jane Manning	2001	Australia
Donuts For Breakfast		Felicity Morgan-Rhind	2000	New Zealand
Harvey		Peter MacDonald	2001	Australia
In Search Of Mike		Andrew Lancaster	2000	Australia
Inja	Dog	Steven Pasvolsky	2001	Australia, Central African Republic
Into The Night		Tony Krawitz	2002	Australia
Joy		Cate Shortland	2000	Australia
Junk		Gregory King	2001	New Zealand
Lamb		Emma Freeman	2002	Australia
Lost		Jo Kennedy	2000	Australia
Road		Catriona MacKenzie	2000	Australia
Rubber Gloves		Anthony Mullins	2000	Australia
Still Life		Sima Urale	2001	New Zealand
The Bathers		Elissa Down	2002	Australia
The Big House		Rachel Ward	2000	Australia
The French Doors		Steve Ayson	2001	New Zealand
The Other Son		Heng Tang	2001	Australia
The Platform		Robin Walters	2001	New Zealand
Trust Me		Virginia Pitts	2000	New Zealand
Vitalogy		Greg Williams	2001	Australia
Watermark			2001	New Zealand
Australia / New Zealand - Retrospective
Original title	English title	Director(s)	Year	Production country
100 A Day		Gillian Armstrong	1973	Australia
Avondale Dogs		Gregor Nicholas	1994	New Zealand
Bits And Pieces		Simon Klaebe	1996	Australia
Bulls		Chris Noonan	1973	Australia
Caravan Park		Phillip Noyce	1973	Australia
Dogfood		Ray Argall	1978	Australia
Eau De La Vie	Life of Life	Simon Bare	1994	New Zealand
Evictions		Richard Lowenstein	1979	Australia
Fizz		Jason Stutter	1999	New Zealand
Getting Wet		P. J. Hogan	1984	Australia
Groping		Alex Proyas	1980	Australia
Hinekaro		Christine Parker	1994	New Zealand
It Droppeth As The Gentle Rain		Bruce Beresford, Albie Thoms	1963	Australia
Kitchen Sink		Alison MacLean	1989	New Zealand
Larger Than Life		Ellory Elkajem	1997	New Zealand
Lemming Aid		Grant Lahood	1994	New Zealand
Lovelock		David Robertson	1992	New Zealand
Michael		Peter Weir	1970	Australia
My First Slumber Party		Shirley Barrett	1987	Australia
My Second Car		Stuart McDonald	1997	Australia
O Tamaiti	Of the Kids	Sima Urale	1996	New Zealand
Odd Jobs		Daniel Nettheim	1996	Australia
Oops!		Mark Bellamy	1999	Australia
Passionless Moments		Jane Campion	1984	Australia
Peel		Jane Campion	1982	Australia
Planet Man		Andrew Bancroft	1995	New Zealand
Rabbit On The Moon		Monica Pellizzari	1988	Australia
Road To Alice		Stavros Efthymiou	1992	Australia
Rust Bucket		Robert Connolly	1997	Australia
Satdee Night		Gillian Armstrong	1973	Australia
Sure To Rise		Niki Caro	1994	New Zealand
Tears		Ivan Sen	1998	Australia
The Colonel		Rolf de Heer	1978	Australia
The Drover'S Wife		Sue Brooks	1985	Australia
The Obituary		Peter Duncan	1993	Australia
The Space Between The Door And The Floor		Pauline Chan	1989	Australia
Tulip		Rachel Griffiths	1998	Australia
Twilight Of The Gods		Stewart Main	1995	New Zealand
Two Bob Mermaid		Darlene Johnson	1996	Australia
Valley of the Stereos		George Port	1992	New Zealand
Violence In The Cinema... Part 1		Dr. George Miller	1972	Australia
The Moebius Strip		Vincent Pluss	2002	Switzerland
Swiss Confederation
Original title	English title	Director(s)	Year	Production country
Das Geschenk	The Gift	Oliver Paulus	2001	Switzerland
Das Passphoto	The Passport Photo	Christina Zulauf	2002	Switzerland
Dust		Ruxandra Zenide	2002	Switzerland
Exit		Beni Kempf	2002	Switzerland
Ibiza		Bettina Oberli	2002	Switzerland
Joshua		Andreas Müller	2002	Switzerland
L'Origine	The Origin	Daniele Torrisi	2002	Switzerland
La Colonie Pénitentiaire	The Penitentiary Colony	Yvan Lagger	2001	Switzerland
La Mort En Exil	Death in Exile	Mutlu Saray Ayten	2002	Switzerland
Le Jeu	The Game	Fabrice Aragno	2002	Switzerland
Mama Hat Dich Lieb	Mom Loves you	Carla Monti	2002	Switzerland
Nuit De Noces	Wedding Night	Olga Baillif	2001	Switzerland, Belgium
Petits Gestes	Gestures	François Rossier	2002	Switzerland
Pizza Canzone	Pizza Song	Jacqueline Falk	2002	Switzerland
Swapped		Pierre Monnard	2001	Switzerland, England
Ungefiltert	Unfiltered	Alexander Szombath	2002	Switzerland

Leopards of Tomorrow (Pardi di Domani) / Filmmakers of the Present

"HGKZ "Special Program
Original title	English title	Director(s)	Year	Production country
Blush		Barbara Kulcsar	1999	Switzerland
Der Astronaut	The Astronaut	Pierre Mennel	1995	Switzerland
Hotel Belgrad	Hotel Belgrade	Andrea Štaka	1998	Switzerland
Orson & Welles		Felix Schaad	1995	Switzerland
Replay		Isabelle Favez	1999	Switzerland
Sjeki Vatsch!		Thomas Ott	2001	Switzerland
Timing		Chris Niemeyer	1999	
Wunderland	Miracle	Michael Hertig	2000	Switzerland
Special Program
Der Komplex	The Complex	Fabienne Boesch	2002	Switzerland
Jouer Sa Vie	Play One's Life	Frédéric Florey, Sandra Hebler	2002	Switzerland
Le Combat	The Fight	Fernand Melgar	2002	Switzerland
Ocumicho Sauvé Par Les Diables	Ocumicho Saved by the Devils	Frédéric Choffat, Julie Gilbert	2002	Switzerland
Saluti Da Mister Frog	Greeti Da My Mystery Frog	Pio Bordoni	2002	Switzerland
The Moebius Strip		Vincent Pluss	2002	Switzerland

=== Video Competition (Concorso Video) ===
Original Title	English Title	Director(s)	Year	Production Country
33		Kiko Goifman	2002	Brazil
9 (Dokuz)	9 (Nine)	Ümit Ünal	2002	Türkiye
Aux Frontières	Border	Danielle Arbid	2002	France, Belgium
Cabeza De Palo	Stick Head	Ernesto Baca	2002	Argentina
Dracula Pages From A Virgin'S Diary		Guy Maddin		Canada
Estranei Alla Massa	Extraneous to the Mass	Vincenzo Marra	2001	Italia
Hff Goes Hollywood		Rosa von Praunheim		Germany
I Am From Nowhere		Georg Misch	2002	Austria, Germany
Jeon Jang Keu I Hu...	Jeon Jang Ke I.	Seong-wook Moon, Nobuhiro Suwa	2002	Korea, China
Kafka Geht Ins Kino	Kafka Goes to the Cinema	Hanns Zischler	2002	France, Germany
Let'S Talk		Ram Madhvani	2002	India
Love And Diane		Jennifer Dworkin	2002	USA, France
O Homem-Teatro	The Theater Man	Edgar Pêra	2001	Portugal
Obor Kalandia	Obor Adventure	Sobhi al-Zobaidi	2002	Palestine
On Dirait Le Sud	It Looks Like the South	Vincent Pluss	2002	Switzerland
Oui Non	Yes No	Jon Jost		France, Italia
Taxi Parisien	Parisian Taxi	Robert Bozzi	2002	France
Un Ora Sola Ti Vorrei	I Would Like One Hour	Alina Marazzi	2002	Italia, Switzerland
Yves Saint Laurent 5 Avenue Marceau 75116 Paris		David Teboul	2002	France

=== Tribute To ===
Tribute To Michel Legrand
Original Title	English Title	Director(s)	Year	Production Country
Les Parapluies De Cherbourg	The Umbrellas of Cherbourg	Jacques Demy	1963	France
Tribute To Roberto Rossellini
La Prise Du Pouvoir Par Louis Xiv	The Taking of Power by Louis XIV	Roberto Rossellini	1966	France

=== Allan Dwan – The Mystery Rediscovered ===
Allan Dwan - The Mystery Rediscovered
Original Title	English Title	Director(s)	Year	Production Country
Fifty-Fifty		Allan Dwan	1916	USA
Stage Struck		Allan Dwan	1925	USA
A Modern Musketeer		Allan Dwan	1917	USA
A Western Dreamer		Allan Dwan	1911	USA
Brewster's Millions		Allan Dwan	1945	USA
Calendar Girl		Allan Dwan	1946	USA
Cattle Queen of Montana		Allan Dwan	1954	USA
Cupid Through Padlocks		Allan Dwan	1912	USA
David Harum	David Fragrant	Allan Dwan	1915	USA
Driftwood		Allan Dwan	1947	USA
East Side, West Side		Allan Dwan	1927	USA
Enchanted Island		Allan Dwan	1958	USA
Escape to Burma		Allan Dwan	1955	USA
Frontier Marshal		Allan Dwan	1939	USA
Getting Gertie's Garter		Allan Dwan	1945	USA
He Comes Up Smiling		Allan Dwan	1918	USA
Heidi		Allan Dwan	1937	USA
Her First Affaire		Allan Dwan	1933	Great Britain
High Air (Dans La Série Screen'S Directors Playhouse)		Allan Dwan	1956	USA
Manhandled		Allan Dwan	1924	USA
Manhattan Madness		Allan Dwan	1916	USA
Most Dangerous Man Alive		Allan Dwan	1961	USA
Passion		Allan Dwan	1954	USA
Pearl of the South Pacific		Allan Dwan	1955	USA
Robin Hood		Allan Dwan	1922	USA
Sands of Iwo Jima		Allan Dwan	1949	USA
Silver Lode		Allan Dwan	1954	USA
Slightly Scarlet		Allan Dwan	1956	USA
Suez		Allan Dwan	1938	USA
Tennessee's Partner		Allan Dwan	1955	USA
That Sharp Note		Allan Dwan	1915	
The Distant Relative		Allan Dwan	1912	USA
The Good Bad Man (Passing Through)		Allan Dwan	1916	USA
The Half-Breed		Allan Dwan	1916	USA
The Iron Mask		Allan Dwan	1929	USA
The Joy Girl		Allan Dwan	1927	USA
The Morning After (I Spy)		Allan Dwan	1934	Great Britain
The Poisoned Flume		Allan Dwan	1911	USA
The Power of Love		Allan Dwan	1912	USA
The Reformation of Sierra Smith (the Lost Watch)		Allan Dwan	1912	USA
The River's Edge		Allan Dwan	1957	USA
The Woman They Almost Lynched		Allan Dwan	1953	USA
Trail of the Vigilantes		Allan Dwan	1940	USA
Up in Mabel's Room		Allan Dwan	1944	USA
While Paris Sleeps		Allan Dwan	1932	USA
Wicked		Allan Dwan	1931	USA
Zaza		Allan Dwan	1923	USA

=== In Progress ===
Original Title	English Title	Director(s)	Year	Production Country
40-15		Annika Larsson	1999	Sweden
An Inner Dialogue With Frida Kahlo (Dialogue With Myself 3)		Yasumasa Morimura	2001	Japan
Black Lagoon		Aran Reo Mann	2001	USA
Castles		Aran Reo Mann	2000	USA
Celovek S Kinoapparatom	Chelovek with a Cinema	Dziga Vertov	1929	Soviet Union
Cigar		Annika Larsson	1999	Sweden
Dog		Annika Larsson	2001	Sweden
Exit		Magnus Wallin	1997	Sweden
Fervor		Shirin Neshat	2000	USA
It S Alive		Aran Reo Mann	2001	USA
Jos 6 Olis 9	If 6 Would be 9	Eija-Liisa Ahtila	1996	Finland
Limbo		Magnus Wallin	1999	Sweden
Me/We, Okay, Gray		Eija-Liisa Ahtila	1993	Finland
Physical Paradise		Magnus Wallin	1998	Sweden
Possessed		Shirin Neshat	2001	USA
Pulse		Shirin Neshat	2001	USA
Rakkaus On Aarre	Love is a Treasure	Eija-Liisa Ahtila	2002	Finland
Rapture		Shirin Neshat	1999	USA
Skyline		Magnus Wallin	2000	Sweden
Tooba	To the	Shirin Neshat	2002	USA
Trilogy		Shirin Neshat		
Turbulent		Shirin Neshat	1998	USA
Tänään	Today	Eija-Liisa Ahtila	1997	Finland

=== Afghan Day ===
Original Title	English Title	Director(s)	Year	Production Country
Aleph Bay-E Afgan		Mohsen Makhmalbaf	2002	Iran
Ammasa - E - Eshq	T	Ing. Latif	1979	Afghanistan
Ashes		Said Workzai	1990	Afghanistan
Cinema		Sebastian Schröder		
Essen, Schlafen, Keine Frauen	Eating, Sleeping, No Women	Heiner Stadler	2002	Germany
Extracts From Charlie Chaplin In Kabul		Lech Kowalski	2002	France, Afghanistan
Gherdab		Temor Hakimiar	1996	Afghanistan
Il Piccolo Gioco	The Little Game	Paolo Grassini Grassini, Beniamino Natale	2002	Italia, Afghanistan
Inshallah: Diary Of An Afghan Woman		Randall Scerbo	2002	USA
Kabul		Pino Settanni	2002	Italia
Madreseh Goosheh Hayat		Farzad Tohidi	2000	Iran
Sayed			1990	Afghanistan
Sougnameh Sarzamin Nimrouz		Amin Aslani	2002	Iran
The Dispossessed		Tanghi Amirani	2002	Great Britain
Uruj		Noor Hashem Abir, Siddiq Barmak	1995	Afghanistan

=== Indian Summer ===
Original Title	English Title	Director(s)	Year	Production Country
Aamar Bhuvan		Mrinal Sen	2002	India
Agraharathil Kazhutai		John Abraham	1978	India
Akaler Shandhaney	In Search of Famine	Mrinal Sen	1980	India
Antarjali Jatra	The Ultimate Journey	Goutam Ghose	1987	India
Ardh Satya		Govind Nihalani	1983	India
Bagh Bahadur		Buddhadeb Dasgupta	1989	India
Dasi		B. Narsing Rao	1988	India
Elippathayam		Adoor Gopalakrishnan	1981	India
Halodhia Choraya Baodhan Khai	Halodia	Jahnu Barua	1987	India
In Which Annie Gives It Those Ones		Pradip Krishen	1989	India
Iruvar	The Duo	Mani Ratnam	1997	India
Junoon	The Obsession	Shyam Benegal	1978	India
Kairee	Carrie	Amol Palekar	1999	India
Kaliyattam	Tasting	Jayaraj	1998	India
Kandukondain, Kandukondain	Saw, Saw	Rajiv Menon	2000	India
Marattam	Mare	Govindan Aravindan	1988	India
Maya Miriga		Nirad Mohapatra	1983	India
Mirch Masala	Hot Spice	Ketan Mehta	1986	India
Mr India		Shekhar Kapur	1987	India
Muhafiz	Idiom	Ismail Merchant	1993	India, Great Britain
Naseem		Saeed Mirza	1995	India
Ondanondu Kaaladalli	Once Upon a Time	Girish Karnad	1978	India
Piravi	The Birth	Shaji N. Karun	1988	India
Shatranj Ke Khilari	The Chess Players	Satyajit Ray	1977	India
Sholay		Ramesh Sippy	1975	India
Siddheshwari		Mani Kaul	1989	India
Tabarana Kathe		Girish Kasaravalli	1987	India
Thaneer Thaneer		K. Balachander	1981	India
The Terrorist		Santosh Sivan	1998	India
Umrao Jaan		Muzaffar Ali	1981	India
Utsab		Rituparno Ghosh	1999	India
Yugant		Aparna Sen	1995	India

=== Events ===
Original Title	English Title	Director(s)	Year	Production Country
Das Boot Ist Voll	The Boat is Full	Markus Imhoof	1980	Switzerland
Monsieur Batignole	Mr Batignole	Gérard Jugnot	2002	France
The Return From India		Menahem Golan		

== Independent Sections ==
=== Critics Week ===
The Semaine de la Critique is an independent section, created in 1990 by the Swiss Association of Film Journalists in partnership with the Locarno Film Festival.

Original Title	English Title	Director(s)	Production Country
Behind Me Mit Bruno Ganz	Behind Me with Bruno Whole	Norbert Wiedmer	Switzerland
Cinemania		Angela Christlieb, Stephen Kijak	Germany
Forget Baghdad-Jews And Arabs-The Iraqi Connection		Samir	Switzerland, Germany
Gaza Strip		James Longley	USA
Guerre Sans Images - Algérie, Je Sais Que Tu Sais	War without Images - Algeria, I Know you Know	Mohammed Soudani	Switzerland, France
Ich Hiess Sabina Spielrein	I Was Called Sabina Spielrein	Elisabeth Màrton	Sweden, Switzerland
Rocha Que Voa	Flying Rock	Eryk Rocha	Brazil

=== Swiss Cinema ===
==== Rediscovered ====
Swiss Cinema Rediscovered
Original Title	English Title	Director(s)	Year	Production Country
Weyerhuus		René Guggenheim	1940	Switzerland

==== Appellation Swiss ====
Original Title	English Title	Director(s)	Year	Production Country
Brucio Nel Vento	Burn in the Wind	Silvio Soldini	2002	Italia, Switzerland
Ernstfall In Havanna	Energy in Havana	Sabine Boss	2002	Switzerland
Escape To Paradise		Nino Jacusso	2001	Switzerland
Hirtenreise Ins Dritte Jahrtausend	Shepherd Trip to the Third Millennium	Erich Langjahr	2002	Switzerland
Julie'S Geist	Julie's Spirit	Bettina Wilhelm	2001	Switzerland, Germany
Meine Schwester Maria	My Sister Maria	Maximilian Schell	2002	Germany, Austria
Stille Liebe	Silent Love	Christoph Schaub	2001	Switzerland
Utopia Blues		Stefan Haupt	2002	Switzerland
Von Werra	From Werra	Werner Schweizer	2002	Switzerland, Germany
War Photographer		Christian Frei	2001	Switzerland

== Official Awards ==
The following films and people received awards at the festival:

=== International Competition ===
- Golden Leopard: Das Verlangen directed by Iain Dilthey
- Silver Leopard: Tan De Repente directed by Diego Lerman, Szép Napok directed by Kornéi Mundruczó
- Special Jury Prize: I'm Taraneh, 15 directed by Rassul Sadr Ameli
- Leopard for Best Actress: Taraneh Alidoosti in I'm Taraneh, 15
- Leopard for Best Actor: Giorgos Karayannis in Diskoli Apocheretismi: O Babas Mou (Hard Goodbyes: My Father)
- Special Mention, official Jury: Tan De Repente directed by Diego Lerman

=== Piazza Grande ===
- Prix du Public UBS: Bend It Like Beckham directed by Gurinder Chadha

=== Leopards of Tomorrow Competition ===
- Golden Leopard, SRG SSR idée Suisse Prize and Egli Film Prize, New Swiss Talents: Nuit De Noces directed by Olga Baillif
- Silver Leopard, Eastman Kodak Company Prize, New Swiss Talents: Swapped directed by Pierre Monnard
- "Action Light" Prize, New Swiss Talents: Dust directed by Ruxandra Zenide
- Special Mention, New Swiss Talents: Still Life directed by Sima Urale
- Golden Leopard, SRG SSR idée Suisse Prize, Australian and New Zealand Films: Delivery Day directed by Jane Manning
- Silver Leopard, Eastman Kodak Company Prize, Australian and New Zealand Films: Lost directed by Jo Kennedy
- Film und Video Subtitling Prize, Australian and New Zealand Films: Vitalogy directed by Greg Williams
- Special Mention, Australian and New Zealand Films: Still Life directed by Sima Urale

=== "Cinema e Gioventù" – Leopards of Tomorrow Jury ===
- Youth Jury Prize, New Swiss Talents, Short Films: Petits Gestes directed by François Rossier
- Special Mention, Youth Jury, New Swiss Talents, Short Films: Dust directed by Ruxandra Zenide
- Youth Jury Prize, Australian and New Zealand Films, Short Films: The French Doors directed by Steve Ayson
- Special Mention, Youth Jury, Australian and New Zealand Films, Short Films: The Bathers directed by Elissa Down

=== Video Competition Jury ===
- Golden Leopard Sony Video: Love And Diane directed by Jennifer Dworkin, Jeon Jang Keu I HU... directed by Nobuhiro Suwa and Seong-wook Moon

=== Ecumenical Jury ===
- Oecumenical Jury Prize: La Cage directed by Alain Raoust
- Special Mention, Oecumenical Jury: Diskoli Apocheretismi: O Babas Mou directed by Penny Panayotopoulou

=== FIPRESCI Jury ===
- FIPRESCI Jury Prize: La Cage directed by Alain Raoust

=== CICAE – Art & Essai Award Jury ===
- CICAE Jury Prize: Meisje directed by Dorothée Van den Berghe
- Special Mention, CICAE Jury: Okay directed by Jesper W. Nielsen
- Don Quijote Prize: Tan De Repente directed by Diego Lerman

=== NETPAC (Network for the Promotion of Asian Cinema) Jury ===
- NETPAC Prize: MR. AND MRS. IYER directed by Aparna Sen, Obor Kalandia directed by Sobhi al-Zobaidi, Ruzegar-E Ma directed by Rakhshan Bani-Etemad

=== Youth Jury ===
- First Prize, Youth Jury: Meisje directed by Dorothée Van den Berghe
- Second Prize, Youth Jury: Mr. And Mrs. Iyer directed by Aparna Sen
- Third Prize, Youth Jury: Tan De Repente directed by Diego Lerman
- "The environnement is the quality of life" Prize": Man, Taraneh, Panzdah Sal Daram directed by Rassul Sadr Ameli
- Special Mention, Youth Jury: Xiang Ji Mao Yi Yang Fei directed by MENG Jing Hui

=== SRG SSR idée suisse | Semain de la critique Award ===
- Critics Week Prize: Forget Baghdad-Jews And Arabs-The Iraqi Connection directed by Samir
