= Hotel La Louisiane =

Hotel in Paris, France

Coordinates: 48.8536°N 2.3369°E

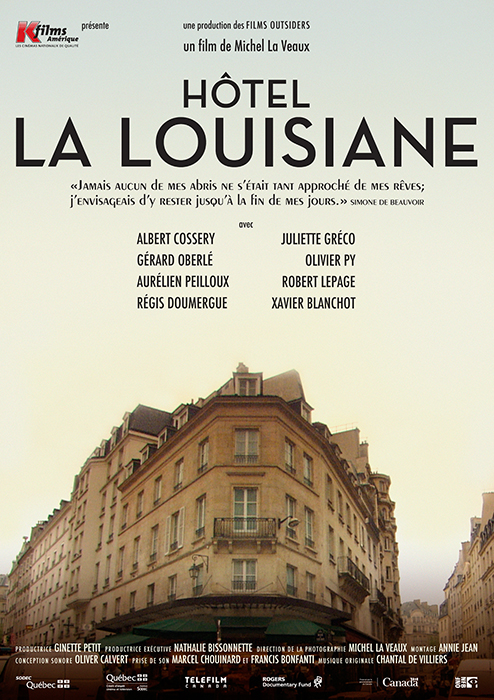
Movie poster with the building

Hotel La Lousiane is a Parisian hotel located at the heart of Saint-Germain-des-Prés at the intersection of rue de Buci and rue de Seine in the sixth arrondissement. It has a main entrance on 60, rue de Seine and a side entrance on 27 rue de Buci. It sits at the crossroad between four central lines: the Passarella des Arts (N), the Luxembourg Garden, (S), rue St Guillaume, (W) and place St Michel, (S). It is most associated with jazz musicians of the 1950s and 1960s. Oscar Peterson, Miles Davis, Bud Powell, Max Roach, Dizzy Gillespie, Art Blakey, Billie Holiday, Lester Young and Charlie Parker all stayed at the hotel. In the early 1960s, Powell and his wife Buttercup resided at the hotel for a long period.

In 1954, a double portrait of Lucian Freud, In Shadow Against the Light from the Window, With His Second Wife, Caroline Blackwood was painted in the hotel. It is on display at the Beaverbrook Art Gallery in Fredericton, Canada.

== History ==
=== Between wars and Second World War ===
It has been run by four generations of the Blanchot family since the 1930s. The hotel has developed a tradition of welcoming writers and artists, some of them well known, such as Salvador Dalí. Jean-Paul Sartre and Simone de Beauvoir moved into the hotel in 1943 and lived there during and after the Second World War, making it a meeting place for existentialists. Albert Camus, Boris Vian, Anne-Marie Cazalis, as well as Claude Simon, also a resident, regularly mingled at the Louisiane.

The fighting for the Liberation of Paris was very violent on rue de Seine and rue de Buci, under the windows of the hotel. Bullet impacts can still be seen on the façade where the main entrance stands. A commemorative plaque reads: "Here fell Jacques Francesco of the second armored division. For France. August 22, 1944." Jacques Francesco is the war name of Auguste Fenioux, who fought in the second armored division under the command of General Leclerc.

== Post-war period ==
Jean-Paul Sartre sets up Juliette Greco in room Ten and moved to room Nineteen which he kept in his name until 1950. Juliette Greco and Miles Davis meet in the hotel which will be the setting of their love story. Albert Cossery, the Egyptian writer elects residence there in 1945 until his death, in 2008. Other writers have lived there, such as Ernest Hemingway, Antoine de Saint-Exupéry, Henry Miller, Cyril Connolly, Peter Berling, and Albertine Sarrazin.

On 4 November 1965, the hotel is mentioned in a letter addressed by Albertine Sarrazin to her mother "I am at the Louisiane hotel, 60 rue de Seine. Seems like Verlaine, Apollinaire, Sartre and Camus came here. An oldish room with a round ceiling and many voices."

During the fifties and the sixties, the cellars of Saint Germain des Pres are turned into jazz concert rooms. It is the case under the hotel with the opening of the Petit Zinc. During that period, the Louisiane welcomes Oscar Peterson, Miles Davis, Bud Powell, Max Roach, Dizzy Gillespie, Billie Holiday, Lester Young and Charlie Parker, John Coltrane, Chet Baker, Mal Waldron, Dexter Gordon, Wayne Shorter.

In the sixties and the seventies, the hotel welcomes many celebrities belonging to the beat generation and to various rock bands. Among them, musicians like Jim Morrisson, lead singer of The Doors, or Pink Floyd. Barbet Schroeder moves in with Mimsy Farmer and Klaus Grunberg to shoot the movie More, which bears the same name as the eponymous Pink Floyd album which makes up the music of the film.

In the summer of 1970, Gene Vincent and Adrian Owlett move to the Louisiane to oversee the production of The Day the World Turned Blue album and to organize the subsequent French tour.

Towards the end of the Eighties, Quentin Tarantino becomes a regular. He called the restaurant scene at the end of Inglourious Basterds, La Louisiane. Bertrand Tavernier shoots his movie titled Round Midnight at la Louisiane. Leos Carax and Juliette Binoche stay there while they shoot Les Amants du Pont-Neuf.

The documentary film of Michel La Veaux, Hôtel La Louisiane describes the way the hotel has impacted the various artists and writers who have made it their residence.

== 2000s ==
In 2002, from 14 to 27 December, Alain Le Gaillard gallery hosts 24 artists in 12 rooms, amongst which: Julien Beneyton, Jean-Luc Bichaud, Nicole Tran Ba Vang, Barthélémy Toguo, Lionel Scoccimaro, Emmanuelle Villard, and Wang Du.

In 2007, at the favour of the Curating Contest exhibit, the rooms of three entire floors are turned into temporary galleries. In each room, a curator invites one or several artists.

From 31 May to 16 June 2018, within the setting of Parcours Saint-Germain, an event bringing together many businesses and hotels to display contemporary works, the hotel welcomes exhibit Chambre 10 by the collective Sans Titre 2016.

The following year, a show titled Flower Power takes place from 23 May to 2 June 2019. Four rooms are turned into exhibition spaces. Artists present their creations on the theme of the sixties-seventies: Martine Aballéa, Pierre Joseph and Frank Perrin, along with the participation of the atelier of Nathalie Talec from the Beaux-Arts of Paris. In November 2019, the exhibition the Shining sees ten artists pay tribute to the Stanley Kubrick movie.

The Louisiane is mentioned in several books, for instance in Hôtels littéraires. In Voyage autour de la terre, Nathalie de Saint-Phalle weaves into her narrative the description of the three oval rooms favoured by writers: rooms Ten, Nineteen and Thirty Six. The current owner, Xavier Blanchot, is one of the pioneers of French Internet. La Louisiane has also been the siege of his offices and of a number of startups since 1999.
