= More (1969 film) =

1969 film by Barbet Schroeder

- Theatrical release poster
- Directed by: Barbet Schroeder
- Screenplay by: Paul Gégauff; Barbet Schroeder
- Story by: Barbet Schroeder
- Produced by: Barbet Schroeder
- Starring: Mimsy Farmer; Klaus Grünberg
- Cinematography: Néstor Almendros
- Edited by: Denise de Casabianca; Rita Roland
- Music by: Pink Floyd
- Production company: Jet Films
- Distributed by: Les Films du Losange (France)
- Release dates: 4 August 1969 (Worldwide); 21 October 1969 (France)
- Running time: 117 minutes
- Countries: West Germany; France
- Languages: English; German; Spanish; French

More is a 1969 English-language romantic drama film written and directed by Barbet Schroeder in his directorial debut. Starring Mimsy Farmer and Klaus Grünberg, the film deals with heroin addiction as drug fascination on the island of Ibiza, Spain. Made in the political fallout of the 1960s counterculture, it features drug use, "free love", and other references to contemporary European youth culture.

The screenplay was written by Paul Gégauff and Barbet Schroeder with the original story by Schroeder. It features a soundtrack written and performed by the English rock band Pink Floyd, released as an album the same year. Schroeder's inspiration for the film came from the counterculture tradition of the 1960s with themes of drugs, addiction, sexual freedom, and the beauty of life often in New Wave films. Production began in 1968 with a low budget, and the film was partially funded by Jet Films and executive produced by Les Films du Losange.

Upon its release on 4 August 1969, More garnered mostly negative reviews from critics. It was selected to be screened in the Cannes Classics section of the 2015 Cannes Film Festival. More was released on DVD on 5 April 2005 by Home Vision Entertainment.

== Plot ==
In West Germany in the late 1960s, Stefan finishes his mathematics studies and decides to experience life. He hitchhikes to Paris and befriends a petty criminal called Charlie after gambling at a bar. Charlie takes him to a party where he is fascinated by an American girl named Estelle, nicknamed the pussycat. Though Charlie warns him that she is a drug user and dangerous, he goes to her hotel room, where she introduces him to marijuana and they make love.

She is leaving for Ibiza and invites Stefan to follow her there. When he arrives, he finds she is involved with a wealthy Spanish ex-Nazi, Dr. Ernesto Wolf, as told by a drug dealer he befriends at a bar. Later, she introduces him to her friends at a hippie party, including her best friend Cathy. Stefan persuades her to join him in an isolated villa and she secretly brings both money and a huge quantity of heroin she has stolen from Wolf. After an idyllic time swimming, sunbathing, and making love, she is itching for the horse drug and introduces him to it as well. After asking a visiting Cathy, she tells Stefan what horse is: heroin.

Soon the two are on a downward spiral of addiction. Wolf demands the return of the rest of the heroin and money and, as payment for what they have used, Stefan has to work in his bar while Estelle has to share his bed. She disappears from Stefan one night, worrying him for a while. Charlie comes looking for Stefan and urges him to return to Paris. Angered by Stefan being with Estelle despite his warnings, Charlie informs him that she had already destroyed two very nice men; he doesn't want Stefan to be the third.

On the night he's supposed to leave for Paris, Stefan demands to know what Estelle did the other night and hits her. After begging for heroin, Estelle reveals to Stefan that she's been sleeping with Wolf the whole time; she didn't like it but was forced to in the deal she made after her theft. After much abuse from Stefan, Estelle runs away, making him panic. He fruitlessly searches for her and hurts a worried Charlie after he tries convincing him it isn't worth it. The next morning, Stefan begs for two packets of heroin from the same dealer he befriended his first day in Ibiza the following morning and overdoses as a suicide, despite the dealer warning him of the drug's intensity. He is buried in the open country and Charlie, very upset, watches.

== Cast ==
- Mimsy Farmer as Estelle Miller
- Klaus Grünberg as Stefan Brückner
- Heinz Engelmann as Dr. Ernesto Wolf
- Michel Chanderli as Charlie
- Henry Wolf as Henry
- Louise Wink as Cathy

== Production ==
One of the most beautiful, most lyrical, and most remarkable films a young director has ever made about his generation.

— Henri Chapier - Combat,

A major film à la Murnau that does not talk about drugs so much as show a certain way of meeting it.

— Serge Daney - Les cahiers du cinéma,

=== Filming ===
Most of the movie was shot on the island of Ibiza. The castle of Ibiza, which dominates the harbour and the town, is the scene for the final act. A tunnel near the castle was also used. In Paris, the movie was shot at Hotel La Louisiane in real room 36.

=== Music ===
His [Barbet Schroeder's] feeling about music for movies was, in those days, that he didn't want a soundtrack to go with the movie. All he wanted was, literally, if the radio was switched on in the car, for example, he wanted something to come out of the car. Or someone goes and switches the TV on, or whatever it is. He wanted the soundtrack to relate exactly to what was happening in the movie, rather than a film score backing the visuals.

— Roger Waters

The soundtrack to the film was composed and performed by English rock band Pink Floyd, and consists of instrumental compositions and more conventional songs, such as "The Nile Song", which (somewhat out of character for Pink Floyd) borders on Stooges-like heavy rock, and a ballad featuring bongos called "Cymbaline", written by Roger Waters and performed by David Gilmour.

== Release ==
=== Censorship ===
The French film censorship board in 1969 insisted that some of the dialogue be censored around the 81-minute mark before the film could be released. In the film, as the couple mixes up a hallucinogenic concoction in the kitchen, the ingredients "benzedrine" and "banana peel" are deleted from the audio track. On the DVD the words have been re-added as subtitles.

=== Critical reception ===
Critics mainly gave bad reviews of More when it was released. It was controversially reviewed by audiences and scholars, who commented on the drug use and impacts. On Rotten Tomatoes, the film has 4 reviews, 3 are negative. At AlloCiné, which assigns a weighted mean rating to reviews, the film has a score of 3.7 based on 42 critics.

Concerning the film's overall design, Roger Ebert stated, "More is a weird, freaky movie about two hedonistic kids who destroy themselves with drugs. More precisely, it's about a kinky American girl who destroys her German boyfriend and in the process destroys herself ... The message seems to be: Sure, speed kills, but what a way to go."

=== Home media ===
The film was released on DVD by The Criterion Collection under Home Vision Entertainment on 5 April 2005. A Blu-ray as a single disc variant with a single DVD disc version was released on 19 September 2011 by the British Film Institute.

== See also ==
- List of French films of 1969
- French New Wave
- Counterculture of the 1960s
