= Jacques Borker =

French artist (1922–2025)

Jacques Borker (29 September 1922 – 23 July 2025) was a French artist and was the most influential and one of the best known tapestry designers of the twentieth century. Borker has long been admired for his fantastic abstract, art deco and contemporary tapestry designs. Working out of Paris during some of the most important art movements of the era, Borker is known for his bold interpretation of the abstract, as well as for his mastery of line work. Borker's work is most associated with Bauhaus and the Art Deco art movement.

== Biography ==
Borker was born in Paris on 29 September 1922. He studied various artistic disciplines including architecture at Ecole des Beaux Arts, where he was a contemporary and friend of Le Corbusier, Charlotte Perriand, Jean Lurçat, Zao Wou-Ki, Pierre Soulages and Hans Hartung. He also studied ceramic art, tapestry and industrial design.

During World War II, Borker was involved in the liberation of Toulouse and was active in the French resistance.

Borker's work has been exhibited at art galleries and museums in many cities around the world.

Borker was the brother of Jules Borker, the French human rights lawyer and former Secretary-General of the Paris branch of the French Bar Association.

== Impact ==
It has been said that for the first time in France during the second half of the twentieth century, due to Borker's work, architecture, painting and design are met in France with grace and harmony. Furthermore, Borker's creative research using simple everyday materials and bright colours has been quoted as "a pleasure for the eye" and his work has given a "certain elegance to late 20th century French art".

== Personal life and death ==
Jacques Borker was married to Paulette Borker, who was also involved with the French resistance during World War II.

Borker later resided in the Parisian street Rue de Seine. He turned 100 in September 2022, and died in Valognes on 23 July 2025, at the age of 102.
