= Rue de Seine =

Street in Paris, France

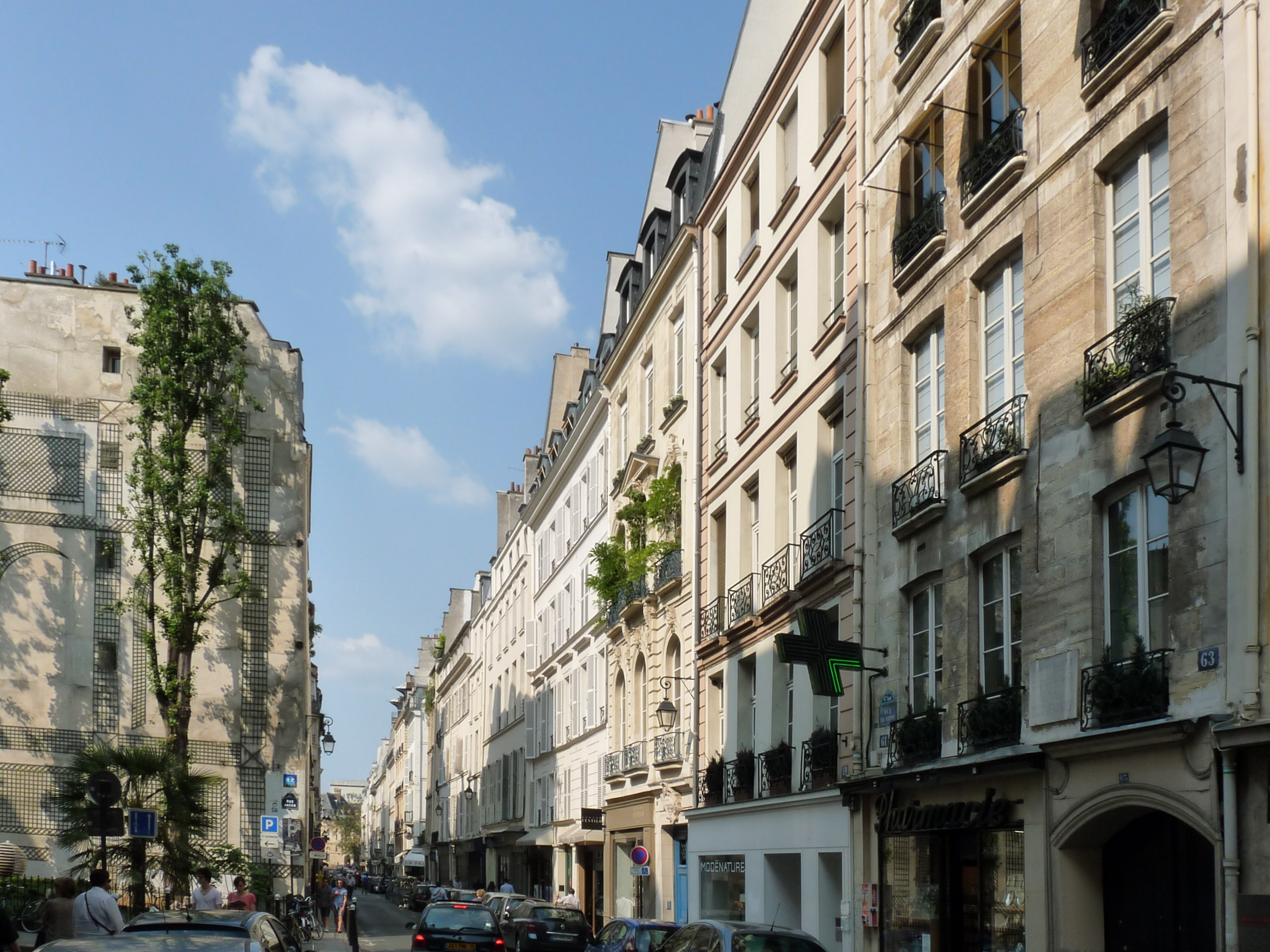
- The Rue de Seine at the level of Rue Jacob

- Location within Paris
- Length: 665 m (2,182 ft)
- Arrondissement: 6th
- Quarter: Saint-Germain-des-Prés
- Coordinates: 48°51′15″N 2°20′13″E
- From: 3 quai Malaquais
- To: 16 rue Saint-Sulpice

Construction
- Completion: 1259

The Rue de Seine (French pronunciation: [ʁy d(ə) sɛn]) is a street in the 6th arrondissement of Paris. It is one of the most sought after streets in Paris due to its history and very close proximity to the Louvre and other famous Parisian landmarks.

The Rue de Seine and surrounding streets are host to the highest concentration of art galleries and antique dealers in the world. Other nearby famous landmarks include the Café de Flore, Les Deux Magots and the Jardin du Luxembourg. The neighbourhood of the Rue de Seine also includes famous fashion houses, such as Dior, Yves Saint Laurent and Hugo Boss.

== In popular culture ==
- The Hotel La Louisiane at 60 rue de Seine is famous for having accommodated many notable jazz musicians and writers, including Miles Davis, Chet Baker, John Coltrane, Ernest Hemingway, Jean-Paul Sartre and Simone de Beauvoir.
- Rue de Seine is the title of a 2006 album by Martial Solal and Dave Douglas.
- In the French novel La Duchesse de Langeais by Honoré de Balzac, the aristocratic character Marquess Armand de Montriveau lived in the Rue de Seine.
- Rue de Seine is the title of a poem by the French poet Jacques Prévert.
- It is also referenced by Julio Cortazar in the first paragraph of his novel Hopscotch (Rayuela).
- It is also famous for Guy Debord's 1953 anticapitalist graffiti Ne travaillez jamais (Never work).

== Notable residents ==
- Count D'Artagnan, captain of the Musketeers of the Guard who died during the Franco-Dutch War, lived at no. 25 rue de Seine.
- Charles Baudelaire, French poet who lived at no. 57 and no. 27 rue de Seine.
- Jacques Borker, 20th-century French artist.
- Raymond Duncan, American dancer, philosopher, artist and brother of Isadora Duncan lived at no. 51 rue de Seine
- Amantine-Lucile-Aurore Dupin known as "George Sand", French novelist known for her numerous affairs with celebrities including Frederic Chopin, lived at no. 52 rue de Seine
- Jessica Lange, American film actor and photographer
- Marcello Mastroianni, Italian film actor
- Adam Bernard Mickiewicz, Polish poet
- Claude-Louis Navier, French engineer and physicist who specialized in mechanics
- St. Vincent de Paul, priest of the Catholic Church who was venerated as a saint in the Catholic Church and the Anglican Communion and known as the "Great Apostle of Charity", lived at no. 1 rue de Seine.

== Gallery ==
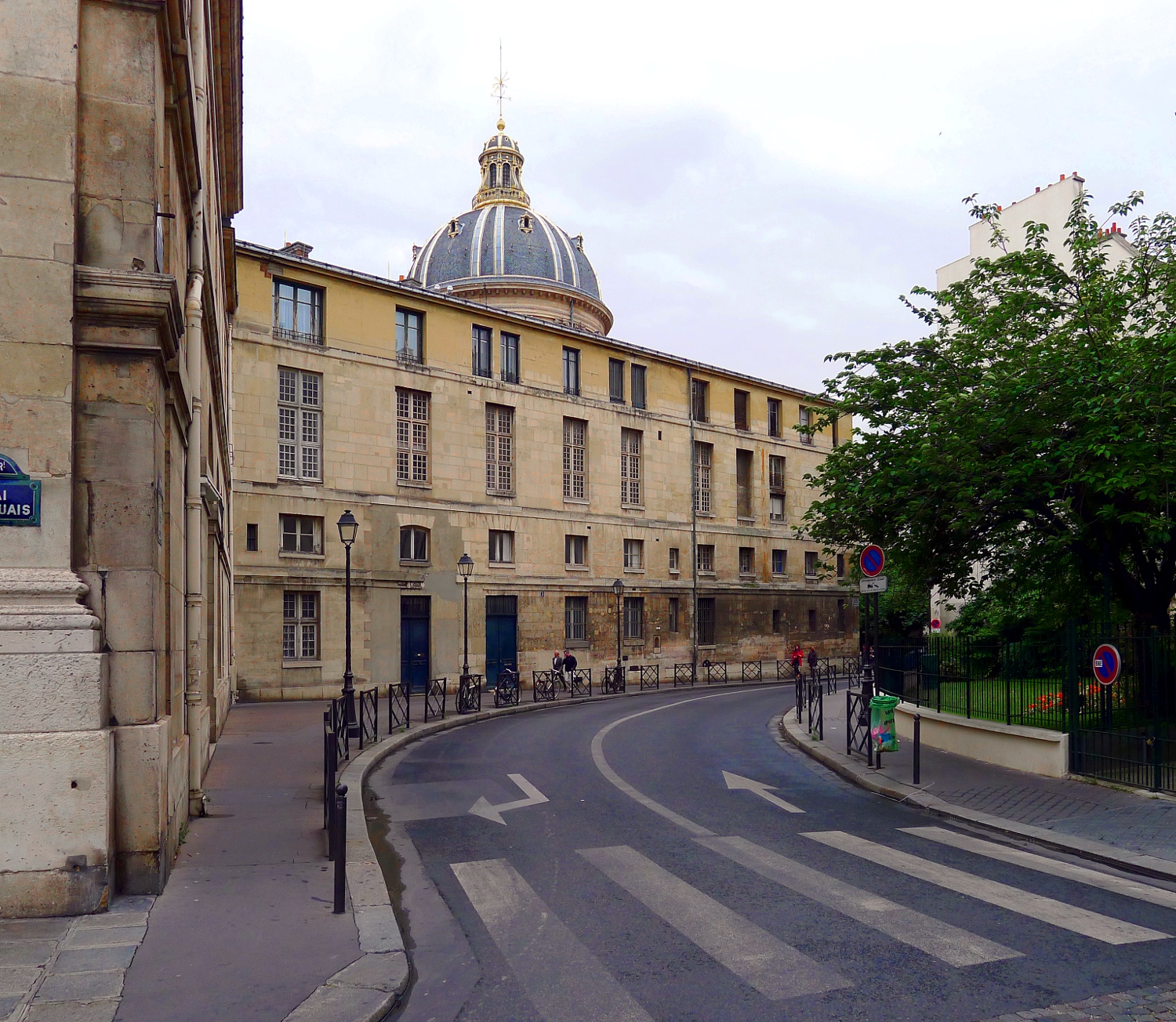
Entrance to the Rue de Seine

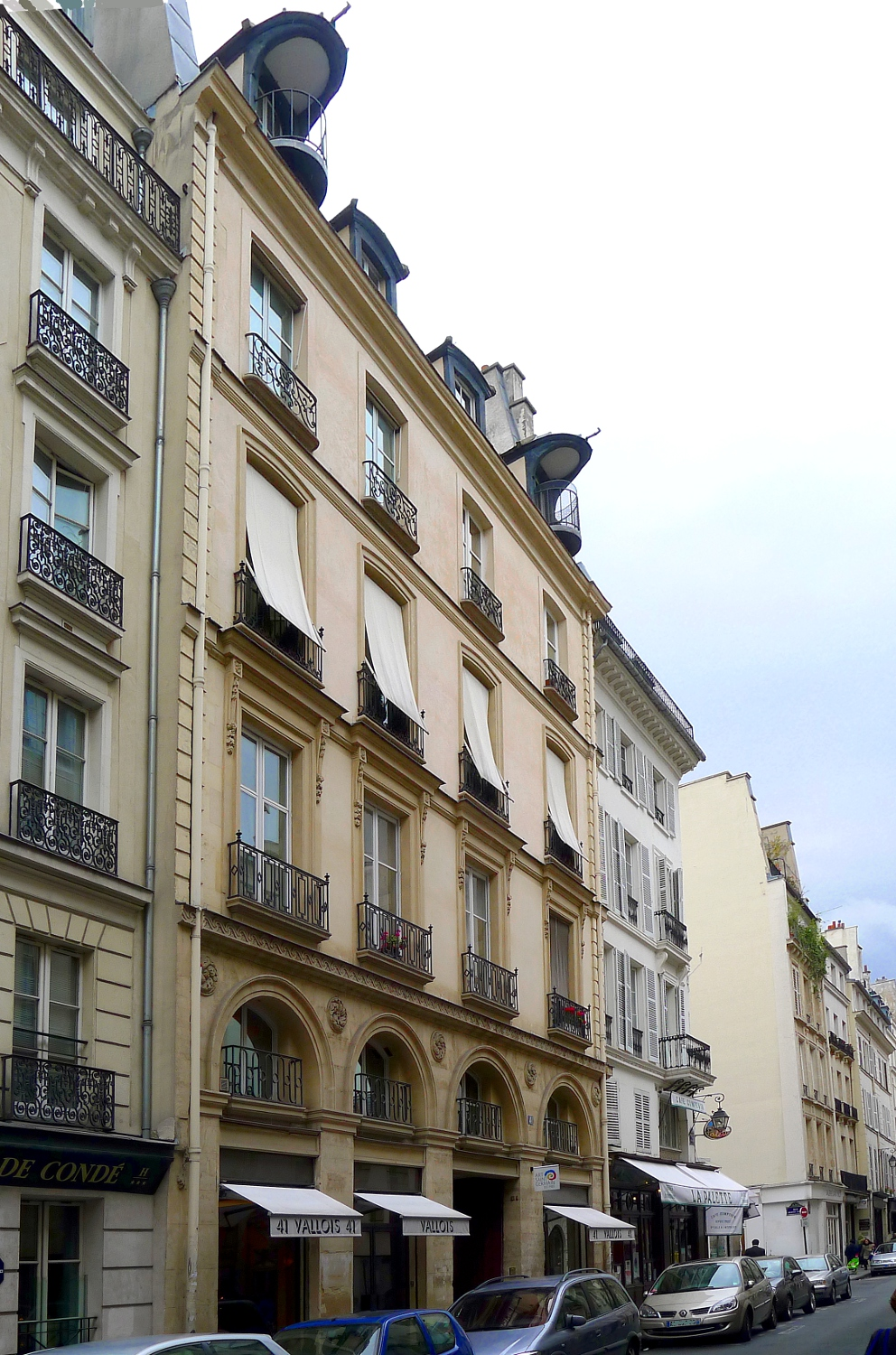
No. 41 Rue de Seine

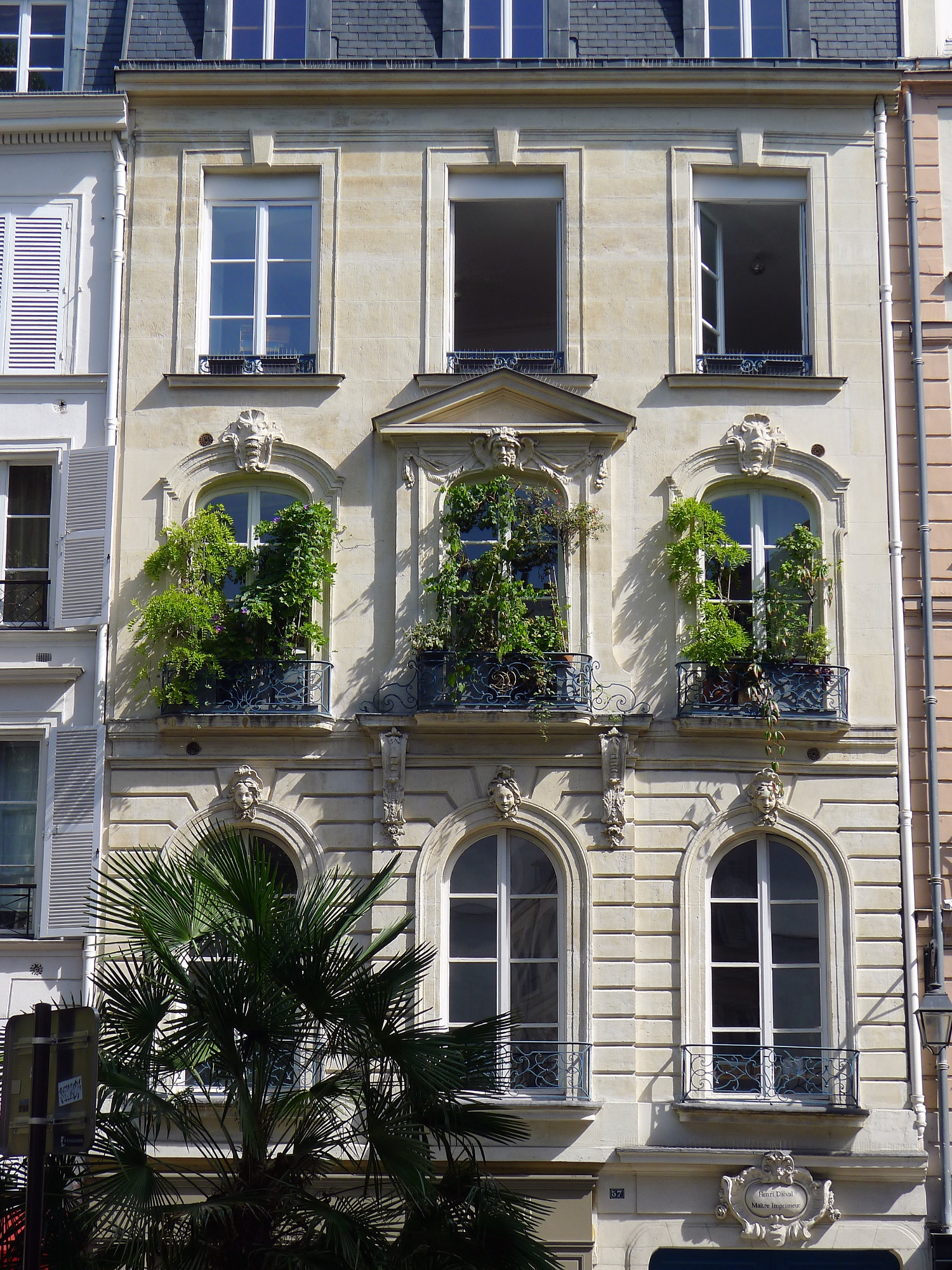
Facade of no. 57 Rue de Seine
