= Klaus Grünberg =

German actor

- Born: Klaus Grünberg; 20 November 1941 (age 84); Wismar, Mecklenburg, Germany

Klaus Grünberg (born 20 November 1941 in Wismar, Germany) is a German actor.

== Filmography ==
Year	Title	Role	Notes
1969	More	Stefan Brückner	
1970	Butterflies Don't Cry	Wolfgang Wagner	
1972	Geradeaus bis zum Morgen	Max	
1972	The Grand Duel	Adam Saxon	
1974	Three Men in the Snow	Ferry	
1974	Goodbye with Mums		
1982	Aufdermauer	Bernd Husemann	
1984	Unerreichbare Nähe	Andreas	
1987	Escape from Sobibor	Sgt. Bauer	TV movie
1987	Ätherrausch	Wolfgang Senne	
1990	Martha and I	Berthold	
1990	Fire, Ice and Dynamite	Executive	
1995	Rudy, the Racing Pig	Niess	
1998	Pi - Die Polizistin	Werner Buckow	
1998	China Dream	Detektiv Probst	
2001	Himmlische Helden	Kurt	
2002	The Longing	Johannes	
2008	Kronos. Ende und Anfang	Uranos	
2012	White Tiger	Shtumpf	
2017	Sky Blue	Blaus Vater	
