= Irene Bignardi =

Italian journalist, film critic, and festival director

- Born: 1943; Quistello, Mantua, Italy
- Occupations: Journalist; Film Critic; Author; Film Festival Director
- Years active: 1976-2020
- Spouse: Claudio Cassinelli (died 1985)
- Children: 1

Irene Bignardi (born 1943) is an Italian journalist, film critic and author. She was the senior film critic and culture writer at la Repubblica for over 15 years. She was the first female artistic director of the Locarno International Film Festival, a position she held from 2001 to 2005. She has worked at the Venice Film Festival, was the director of the MystFest film festival, and has served on many international film festival juries.

== Education ==
She studied Literature at the University of Milan and went on to study in Communications at Stanford University under a Fulbright Fellowship.

== Career ==
Bignardi worked as journalist at the newspaper la Repubblica since its founding in 1976. She wrote mainly about entertainment and culture becoming the senior film critic in 1989. She was also a film critic for the weekly magazine l’Espresso from 1979 until her appointment as senior film critic at la Repubblica in 1989.

In this same time period, she became involved in MystFest, the international Film Noir film festival held in Cattolica, Italy. First she worked as an assistant to the festival head, Felice Laudadio, and eventually took over as festival director in 1986. She was the head of the festival for fours years, until 1989.

In 1992 she became the co-head of the Venetian Nights section of the Venice Film Festival. In 1999, she served on the Cannes Film Festival jury for the Un Certain Regard section. She has also served on the juries at the San Sebastian Film Festival and the Sundance Film Festival.

In 2001 she was appointed the director of the Locarno Film Festival. She was the first female director of the festival and served as chef for five years. She stepped down in 2005. In 2006 she became the president of FilmItalia and was in charge until 2008. She retired from her position as a journalist and critic at la Repubblica in 2020.

She is also the author of multiple articles and books on film as well as multiple documentaries.

== Personal life ==
She was born in Quistello, Mantua, Italy in 1943. She was married to Italian actor Claudio Cassinelli until his death in 1985. Together the couple had one son.

== Awards ==
In 1996 Bignardi received the Order of Merit of the Italian Republic, as a Commendatore della Repubblica Italiana, Italy’s highest civilian honor.

== Selected works ==
- Zone. Vincenzo Castella. Arte. 1991.
- Ieri, oggi, domani. Cent'anni di cinema italiano, a cura di I. Bignardi, F. Ferzetti e G. Cosetti, Zephiro, 1995.
- Il declino dell'impero americano. 50 registi e 101 film, Milano, Feltrinelli, 1996, ISBN 978-88-078-1389-4
- Memorie estorte ad uno smemorato. Vita di Gillo Pontecorvo (Collana Serie Bianca ed.). Milano: Feltrinelli. 1999. ISBN 8807170337.
- Le piccole utopie. Milano: Feltrinelli. 2003. ISBN 8807170833.
- Americani. Un viaggio da Melville a Brando (Collana I nodi ed.). Venezia: Marsilio. 2005. ISBN 978-8831787086.
- Le cento e una sera. Piccola guida personale al cinema in DVD (Collana I nodi ed.). Venezia: Marsilio. 2008. ISBN 978-8831795142.
- Storie di cinema a Venezia (Collana I nodi ed.). Venezia: Marsilio. 2012 [Consorzio Venezia Nuova, 2011].
- Brevi incontri con Jorge Luis Borges, John Le Carré, Billy Wilder, Graham Greene, Mary McCarthy, François Truffaut, Gabriel Garcia Márquez, Leni Riefensthal, Susan Sontag, Isaiah Berlin... (Collana I nodi ed.). Venezia: Marsilio. 2013. ISBN 9788831716772.
- Kerestetìl. Astoria. 2017. ISBN 978-8898713684.
