= Ernesto McCausland =

Colombian journalist, writer and filmmaker

Ernesto McCausland Sojo
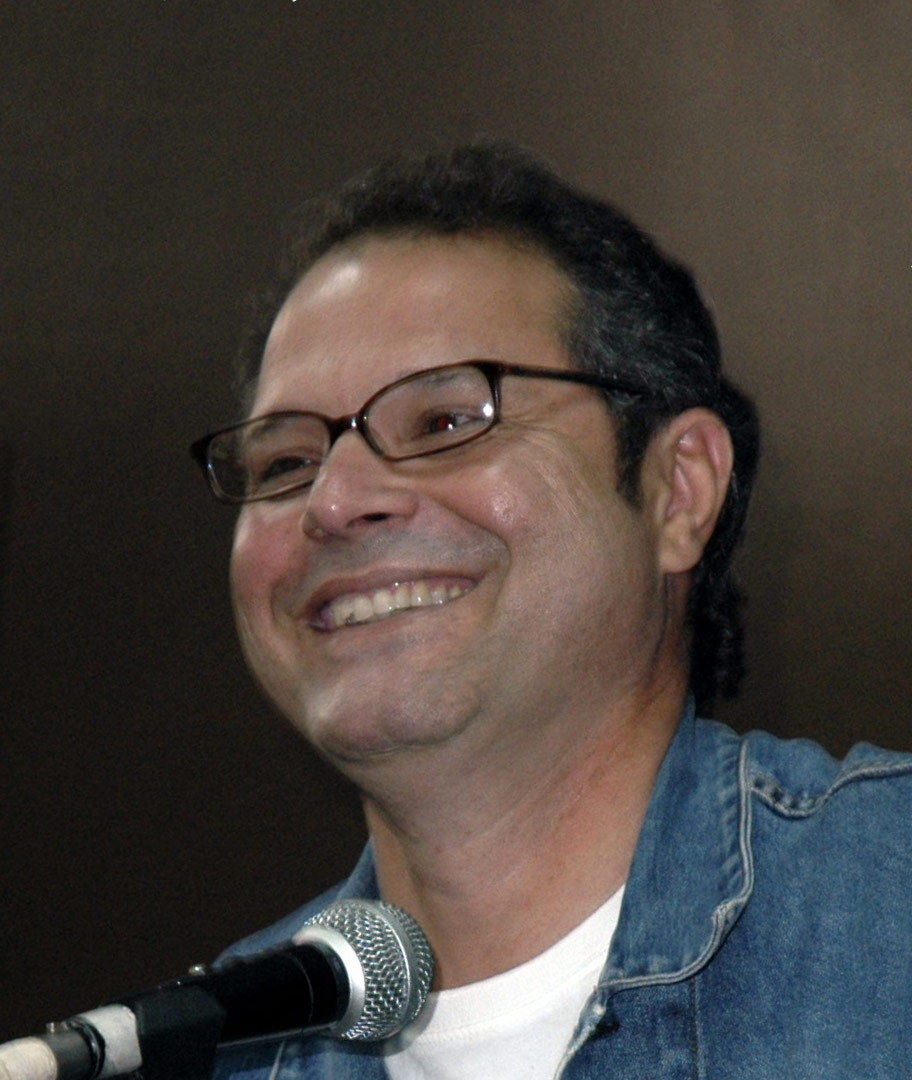
- Ernesto McCausland at the 18th International Book Fair
- Born: January 4, 1961; Barranquilla, Atlántico, Colombia
- Died: November 21, 2012 (aged 51)
- Occupation: Journalist
- Years active: 1982–2012
- Awards: India Catalina Award, Simón Bolívar Award, Postobón Award

Ernesto McCausland Sojo (January 4, 1961– November 21, 2012) was a Colombian journalist, writer and filmmaker.

== Career ==
McCausland began in journalism in 1982, as a reporter of crime stories for his home town newspaper El Heraldo.

He later started to work in the genre of narrative journalism, becoming one of the best in multiple fields such as press, radio and TV in Colombia. At the same time, he conducted "Mundo Costeño", a narrative journalism program on the regional channel Telecaribe, where he highlighted the customs and traditions of the Colombian Caribbean Region.

In the mid-1990s he worked as a news anchor for the QAP television news. Since 2007 he hosted A las 11, an interview program on Telecaribe. Since 2008 he worked as co-anchor of Canal Caracol's "El Radar", program. McCausland conducted the Vallenato Legend Festival on several occasions. He was a collaborator for Colombia's "SoHo" and Spain's "Interviú" magazines. He was also a columnist for El Heraldo.

Since 1998, he led his own production studio, La Esquina del Cine, where he worked with some of the most talented young producers in the Colombian Caribbean Region.

McCausland won several journalistic awards during his professional career.

== Books ==
Some of his best works in the genre of narrative journalism are included in his book Las Crónicas de McCausland (Espasa, 1996). His writings have also been included in such compilations as Antología de grandes reportajes colombianos (Alfaguara) and Antología de grandes crónicas colombianas (Alfaguara) by Daniel Samper.

He published two novels, Febrero escarlata (Planeta, 2004) and El Alma del Acordeón (Intermedio, 2006).

== Filmography ==
McCausland directed three films; El último Carnaval, Champeta Paradise, and Siniestro, the latter of which won the award as the best Colombian film of 2000. He also directed 14 short films and several documentaries.

== Awards ==
- Simón Bolívar, "Urrá, Los Costos del Retraso" – El Heraldo 1983.
- Simon Bolívar, "De la Calle a la Gloria" – Mundo Costeño, Telecaribe, 1987.
- India Catalina, Mejor Programa Telecaribe – Mundo Costeño, 1988.
- Postobón, "Didí en Medellín" – Mundo Costeño, 1989.
- Gama, Mejor Programa Telecaribe – Mundo Costeño, 1989.
- CPB, "Dos Vidas, Un Mineral" – Mundo Costeño, 1991.
- Simón Bolívar, "La Promesa del Campeón" – Mundo Costeño, 1993.
- Simón Bolívar, "Efraín Camargo" – QAP Noticias, 1996.
- Mincultura, Película "Siniestro", Colombia, 2000–2001.
- India Catalina TV, Toda una vida. 2004
