= The Longing (film) =

2002 German film by Iain Dilthey

- Directed by: Iain Dilthey
- Starring: Susanne-Marie Wrage; Klaus Grünberg; Robert Lohr
- Release date: 8 August 2002 (LIFF)
- Running time: 90 minutes
- Country: Germany
- Language: German

The Longing (German: Das Verlangen) is a 2002 German film directed by Iain Dilthey. It won the Golden Leopard at the 2002 Locarno International Film Festival.

== Cast ==
- Susanne-Marie Wrage: Lena
- Klaus Grünberg: Johannes
- Robert Lohr: Paul
- Heidemarie Rohweder: Martha
- Manfred Kranich: Griesbacher
