= Off to the Revolution by a 2CV =

2001 film by Maurizio Sciarra

- Directed by: Maurizio Sciarra
- Starring: Adriano Giannini; Gwenaëlle Simon; Andoni Garcia; Georges Moustaki; Óscar Ladoire; Francisco Rabal
- Cinematography: Arnaldo Catinari
- Music by: Lele Marchitelli
- Release date: 2001

Off to the Revolution by a 2CV (Italian: Alla rivoluzione sulla due cavalli) is a 2001 Italian comedy film directed by Maurizio Sciarra. It won the Golden Leopard at the 2001 Locarno International Film Festival.

== Cast ==
- Adriano Giannini: Marco
- Gwenaëlle Simon: Claire
- Andoni Garcia: Victor
- Francisco Rabal: Uncle Henrique
- Georges Moustaki: the poet
- Óscar Ladoire: Count Agaruez
