= Maurizio Sciarra =

Italian film director (born 1955)

- Born: 15 April 1955 (age 71); Bari, Italy
- Occupation: Film director
- Years active: 1976–present

Maurizio Sciarra (born 15 April 1955) is an Italian film director.

He was awarded the Golden Leopard at the 2001 Locarno Film Festival for Off to the Revolution by a 2CV.
