= Kimi Takesue =

Experimental filmmaker

Kimi Takesue is an experimental filmmaker. Her films have screened widely, including at Sundance Film Festival, Locarno Festival, the Museum of Modern Art, International Film Festival Rotterdam, the Los Angeles Film Festival, South by Southwest, ICA London, Cinéma du Réel, DMZ International Documentary Film Festival, Krakow Film Festival, Slamdance Film Festival, Museum of Contemporary Art Shanghai, and the Walker Art Center. Her films have been broadcast on PBS, IFC, and the Sundance Channel. Her awards include a Guggenheim Fellowship, a Rockefeller Media Arts Fellowship, and two NYFA fellowships. She is associate professor at Rutgers University–Newark.

== Films ==
=== Onlookers ===
Onlookers (2023) is a feature-length meditative documentary inviting audiences to reflect on their own modes of tourism, while asking the looming existential questions: Why do we travel? What do we seek? The film won an Honorable Mention at the Slamdance Film Festival. Film Comment called the film “a wry and at times uproarious ethnographic work," and "revelatory".

=== 95 and 6 to Go ===
95 and 6 to Go (2016) is a feature-length documentary about family, memory and loss, as the filmmaker visits her grandfather. The film won the Prize for Best Feature Documentary at the Los Angeles Asian Pacific International Film Festival, and was nominated for the 2017 European Doc Alliance Award.

=== Where Are You Taking Me? ===
Where Are You Taking Me? (2010) is a feature-length experimental documentary that complicates the relationship between ethnographer and subject. The film depicts the artist's trip through Uganda in poetic glimpses of quotidian life. The New York Times called the film, "an unusual, visually rich visit to the nation." Time Out and LA Weekly selected Where Are You Taking Me? as critics' picks. Variety called the film “beautifully meditative" and "an uplifting observational documentary that plays on seeing and being seen."

== Awards ==
Takesue has been awarded fellowships from the Guggenheim Foundation, the Rockefeller Foundation, NYFA, Kodak, the Center for Asian American Media, Yaddo and the MacDowell Colony. Her films have been supported by grants from ITVS, Ford Foundation, and New York State Council on the Arts, amongst others.
