= Iain Dilthey =

British film director

Iain Dilthey (born 1971 in Scotland) is a British film director.

== Filmography ==
- Ich werde dich auf Händen tragen (2000)
- The Longing (2002)
- Gefangene (2006)

== Awards ==
He was awarded the Golden Leopard at the 2002 Locarno International Film Festival for The Longing.
