= Publications by Rupert Hart-Davis =

Releases by the English publisher

This list of books published by Rupert Hart-Davis comprises titles reviewed in The Times Literary Supplement (1947 to 1974), plus reprints in the Mariners Library and Reynard Library series.

== Background and history ==
After serving in the Second World War, Hart-Davis returned to his pre-war occupation as a publisher. In 1946 he founded Rupert Hart-Davis Ltd, in partnership with David Garnett and Edward Young and with financial backing from Eric Linklater, Arthur Ransome, H. E. Bates, Geoffrey Keynes, and Celia and Peter Fleming. His own literary tastes dictated which books were accepted and which rejected. Frequently he turned down commercial successes because he thought little of the works' literary merit. He later said, "I usually found that the sales of the books I published were in inverse ratio to my opinion of them. That's why I established some sort of reputation without making any money."

When the firm started, paper was rationed; they used Garnett's ex-serviceman's ration, but only one such ration per firm could be used so they could not use that of Hart-Davis. They were given the allocation at cost of a Glasgow bookseller and occasional prewar publisher, Alan Jackson. They decided to start initially with reprints of dead authors, as if a new book became a best-seller they would not have paper for a reprint and the author would leave the firm. They made an exception for Stephen Potter's Gamesmanship which was a short book; they collected every ream of paper they could buy, and printed 25,000 copies. Likewise 25,000 copies of Eric Linklater's Sealskin Trousers (five short stories) were printed.

The firm had best-sellers such as Stephen Potter's Gamesmanship and Heinrich Harrer's Seven Years in Tibet, which sold more than 200,000 copies. Also in the early years Hart-Davis secured Ray Bradbury for his firm, recognising the quality of a science fiction author who also wrote poetry. Other good sellers were Peter Fleming, Eric Linklater and Gerald Durrell; but best-sellers were too few, and though the output of Rupert-Hart-Davis Ltd was regularly praised for the high quality of its printing and binding, that too was an expense that weighed the company down.

When G. M. Young's life of Stanley Baldwin was published in 1952, both Churchill and Beaverbrook threatened to sue if certain passages were not removed or altered. With the help of the lawyer Arnold Goodman an agreement was reached to replace the offending sentences, but they had the "hideously expensive" job of removing and replacing seven leaves from 7,580 copies.

By the middle of the 1950s, Rupert Hart-Davis Ltd could no longer sustain an independent existence and in 1956 it was absorbed into the Heinemann group. Heinemann sold the imprint to the American firm Harcourt Brace in 1961, who sold it to the Granada Group in 1963, when Hart-Davis retired from publishing, though remaining as non-executive chairman until 1968. Publications by the firm after Hart-Davis's retirement are included in the list. Hart-Davis continued to contribute some books to the company's lists after he retired.

The Rupert Hart-Davis Ltd logo was a woodcut of a fox, with a background of oak leaves. The company was based at No. 36 Soho Square, London W1 from 1950, when they moved from 53 Connaught Street. Initially they planned to publish eight books according to their first advertisement in The Bookseller, including Fourteen Stories by Henry James which was dated 1946 but did not actually appear until 14 February 1947. The annual book output according to Hart-Davis was: 1948, 16; 1949, 21; 1950, 25; 1951, 40; 1952, 37; (1953 not given); 1954, 41; 1955, 46; 1956, 45; 1957, 55 then 1962, 60.

Book series published over the years by Rupert Hart-Davis included the Reynard Library of reprints of works from the great English writers, the Mariners Library of reprints of nautical books, and the Soho Bibliographies started with W. B. Yeats by Allan Wade in 1951. In 2003 Thomas Tanselle characterized the Soho Bibliographies as a "publishing outlet for serious bibliographies encouraging the adoption of higher standards and eventually exerting a considerable influence on the form of descriptive bibliographies."

While under Granada's ownership, Hart-Davis merged with MacGibbon and Kee in 1972, forming Hart-Davis, MacGibbon, later known as Granada Publishing. William Collins, Sons acquired Granada Publishing in 1983, renaming it Grafton Books after the editorial offices' address.

Year	Title	Author	Editor/illustrator etc.
1947	Fourteen Stories by Henry James	James, Henry	Garnett, David (editor)
1947	Democracy and the Arts	Brooke, Rupert	Keynes, Geoffrey (preface)
1947	Are These Hardships Necessary?	Harrod, Roy	
1947	Sealskin Trousers, and other Stories	Linklater, Eric	Hassall, Joan (illustrator)
1947	The Theory and Practice of Gamesmanship; or, The Art of Winning Games without Actually Cheating	Potter, Stephen	Wilson, F., Lieutenant-Colonel (illustrator)
1948	The Modern Everyman	Burn, Michael	
1948	Henry James and Robert Louis Stevenson: A Record of Friendship and Criticism	James, Henry, and Robert Louis Stevenson	Smith, Janet Adam (editor)
1948	The Firm of Charles Ottley, Landon, and Co	Carter, John	Pollard, Graham
1948	Sailing Alone Around the World and Voyage of the Liberdade	Slocum, Captain Joshua	The Mariners Library No. 1, Introduction by Arthur Ransome
1949	Two Memoirs: Dr Melchior: A Defeated Enemy, and My Early Beliefs	Keynes, John Maynard	Garnett, David (introduction)
1949	The Other House	James, Henry	Edel, Leon (introduction)
1949	Praeterita: Outlines of Scenes and Thoughts Perhaps Worthy of Memory in my Past Life	Ruskin, John	Clark, Kenneth (introduction)
1949	The Loud Red Patrick	McKenney, Ruth	
1949	The Life of William Blake	Wilson, Mona	
1949	Blake Studies: Notes on his Life and Works in Seventeen Chapters	Keynes, Geoffrey	
1949	Sergeant Shakespeare	Cooper, Duff	
1949	The Scenic Art: Notes on Acting and Drama	James, Henry	Wade, Allan (editor), Edel, Leon (foreword)
1950	The Complete Plays	James, Henry	Edel, Leon (editor)
1950	Shakespeare's Sonnets Dated, and other Essays	Hotson, J. Leslie	
1950	A Stranger on The Stair	Mortimer, Chapman	
1950	Elephant Bill	Lt. Col. J.H. Williams	Slim, William, Field Marshal (foreword)
1950	Mr Byculla	Linklater, Eric	
1950	Sir Philip Sidney	Wilson, Mona	
1950	Love Story	McKenney, Ruth	
1950	Cricket all his Life: Cricket Writings in Prose and Verse	Lucas, E. V.	Hart-Davis, Rupert (editor)
1950	Last Essays	Young, G. M.	
1950	Magic City, and other Stories	Milton, Roderick	
1950	Goldsmith: Selected Works	Goldsmith, Oliver	Garnett, Richard (editor)
1950	Some Notes on Lifemanship	Potter, Stephen	Wilson, Frank, Lieutenant-Colonel (illustrator)
1950	Operation Heartbreak	Cooper, Duff	
1950	The Dolphin in the Wood	Bates, Ralph	
1950	A Generation on Trial	Cooke, Alistair	
1951	Call It Treason	Howe, George	
1951	Robert Louis Stevenson: Collected Poems	Stevenson, Robert Louis	Smith, Janet Adam (editor)
1951	Spaces of the Dark	Mosley, Nicholas	
1951	Edmund Blunden: A Selection of his Poetry and Prose	Blunden, Edmund	Hopkins, Kenneth (editor)
1951	Sterne	Sterne, Laurence	Grant, Douglas (editor)
1951	Father Goose	Mortimer, Chapman	
1951	Johnson: Prose and Poetry	Johnson, Samuel	Wilson, Mona (editor)
1951	Hilaire Belloc: An Anthology of his Prose and Verse	Belloc, Hilaire	Roughead, W. N. (editor)
1951	The Wink	Bennett, Kem	
1951	Here's England	McKenney, Ruth, and Richard Bransten	Lancaster, Osbert (illustrator)
1951	Mistletoe Malice	Farrell, Kathleen	
1951	And So It Goes On: Further Thoughts on Present Mismanagement	Harrod, R. F.	
1951	The Sixth Column	Fleming, Peter	
1951	Fright in the Forest	Sowerby, Benn	Sassoon, Siegfried (introduction)
1951	Ti-Coyo and his Shark	Richer, Clement	Hopkins, Gerard (translator)
1951	The Sky is a Lonely Place	Falstein, Louis	
1951	A Place to Hide	King, Clifford	
1951	A Guide through the District of the Lakes in the North of England	Wordsworth, William	Merchant, W. M. (introduction)
1951	The Lightning that Struck Me	Milton, Roderick	
1951	The Build-Up Boys	Kirk, Jeremy	
1951	The Dog Star	Windham, Donald	
1951	The Silver Locusts	Bradbury, Ray	
1951	The Crippled Muse	Wheeler, Hugh	
1951	The Swan	Steen, Marguerite	
1951	Childhood at Oriol	Burn, Michael	
1951	The Magic of my Youth	Calder-Marshall, Arthur	
1951	End of the Line	Baron, Stanley Wade	
1951	Letters from America	Cooke, Alistair	
1951	The "Falcon" in the Baltic	Knight, E. F.	The Mariners Library No 15, Introduction by Arthur Ransome
1952	A Bibliography of the Writings of W. B. Yeats	Wade, Allan	
1952	The Dead Won't Know	Séchan, Olivier	Sainsbury, Geoffrey (translator)
1952	Dryden: Poetry, Prose, and Plays	Dryden, John	Grant, Douglas (editor)
1952	The Next Million Years	Darwin, Charles Galton, Sir	
1952	Into Hades	Young, Andrew	
1952	Music at Belmont	Sheppard, J. T.	
1952	My Friend Vassia	Rounault, Jean	Traill, Vera (translator), Chapman, Guy (introduction)
1952	Two Shadows Pass	King, Clifford	
1952	Harpoon at a Venture	Maxwell, Gavin	
1952	Gustave Courbet	Mack, Gerstle	
1952	The Life and Voyages of Captain Joshua Slocum	Slocum, Victor	
1952	All my Enemies	Baron, Stanley Wade	
1952	The Illustrated Man	Bradbury, Ray	
1952	Shakespeare's Motley	Hotson, J. Leslie	
1952	A. E. Housman: An Annotated Hand-List	Carter, John, and John Sparrow	
1952	ABC for Book-Collectors	Carter, John	
1952	A Bibliography of the Works of Max Beerbohm	Gallatin, A. E., and Oliver, L. M	
1952	One-Upmanship	Potter, Stephen	
1952	Voyage in a Barquentine	Roach, Peter	Seligman, Adrian (introduction)
1952	The Midnight Diary	Burn, Michael	
1952	One of our Submarines	Young, Edward	
1952	A Forgotten Journey	Fleming, Peter	
1952	Stanley Baldwin	Young, G. M.	
1952	The Cruise of the Alerte	Knight, E. F.	The Mariners Library No 21, Introduction by Arthur Ransome
1953	The Drunken Boat	Rimbaud, Arthur	Hill, Brian (translator)
1953	Macaulay: Prose and Poetry	Macaulay, Thomas Babbington	Young, G. M. (editor)
1953	Working with Roosevelt	Rosenman, Samuel	Sherwood, Robert E. (preface)
1953	People and Americans	Baron, Stanley Wade	
1953	Coleridge	House, Humphry	
1953	The Weeping and the Laughter: A Chapter of Autobiography	MacLaren-Ross, Julian	
1953	The Book of Cricket Verse: An Anthology	various	Brodribb, Gerald (editor)
1953	Around Theatres	Beerbohm, Max	
1953	The Power and the Valley	Billings, Henry	
1953	Landsman Hay: The Memoirs of Robert Hay, 1789–1847	Hay, Robert	Hay, M. D. (editor)
1953	Henry James: The Untried Years, 1843–1870	Edel, Leon	
1953	Take It to Heart	Farrell, Kathleen	
1953	Norman Douglas	Dawkins, R. M.	
1953	The Frozen Flame	O'Brian, Patrick	
1953	Bandoola	Williams, J. H., Colonel	
1953	The Voyage of Anahita	Bernicot, Louis, Captain	Allcard, Edward (translator)
1953	Seven Years in Tibet	Harrer, Heinrich	Graves, Richard (translator)
1953	The Golden Apples of the Sun	Bradbury, Ray	Peters, Eric (translator)
1953	A Blessed Girl: Memoirs of a Victorian Girlhood	Lutyens, Lady Emily	
1953	A Bibliography of James Joyce, 1882–1941	Slocum, John J.	Cahoon, Herbert
1953	Old Men Forget: An Autobiography	Cooper, Duff	
1953	The March Out	Shaw, James	
1953	Poems to Mary	Burn, Michael	
1953	Hackenfeller's Ape	Brophy, Brigid	
1953	Hunting Scenes from Surtees	Surtees, Robert	Gough, Lionel (editor)
1953	Stings and Honey	Jones, L. E.	
1953	The Cruise of the Kate	Middleton, E. E.	The Mariners Library No 23, Introduction by Arthur Ransome
1954	The Incredible Mizners	Johnston, Alva	
1954	Ballads and other Verse	Mackintosh, H. S.	
1954	Wood Engravings of Thomas Bewick	Bewick, Thomas	Stone, Reynolds (editor)
1954	Tomorrow is Already Here	Jungk, Robert	Waldman, M. (translator)
1954	Perdu and his Father	Rombi, Paride	Reed, Henry (translator)
1954	Three Singles to Adventure	Durrell, Gerald	
1954	Matthew Arnold: Poetry and Prose	Arnold, Matthew	Bryson, John (editor)
1954	The Golden Honeycomb	Cronin, Vincent	
1954	Fahrenheit 451	Bradbury, Ray	
1954	Jubilate Agno	Smart, Christopher	Bond, W. H. (editor)
1954	Son of Ti-Coyo	Richer, Clement	Hopkins, Gerard (translator)
1954	A Bewilderment of Birds	Stanford, J. K.	
1954	A Bibliography of Norman Douglas	Woolf, Cecil	
1954	The Dancing Bear	Faviell, Frances	
1954	A Tale of Two Brothers: John and Charles Wesley	Brailsford, Mabel Richmond	
1954	The Journal of William Beckford in Portugal and Spain, 1787–1788	Beckford, William	Alexander, Boyd (editor)
1954	The Cut of the Axe	Jackson, Delmar	
1954	A Rogue with Ease	Argus, M. K.	
1954	Matthew Arnold: Poetry and Prose	Arnold, Matthew	Bryson, John (editor)
1954	Old Men Forget	Cooper, Duff	
1954	Two Memoirs	Keynes, John Maynard	
1954	A Bibliography of Rupert Brooke	Keynes, Geoffrey, Dr	
1954	Edinburgh: Picturesque Notes	Stevenson, Robert Louis	Coburn, Mr (illustrator), Smith, Janet Adam (preface)
1954	Tombolo	Fersen, Nicholas	
1954	The Collected Poems of Mary Coleridge	Coleridge, Mary	Whistler, Theresa (editor)
1954	The First Night of "Twelfth Night"	Hotson, J. Leslie	
1954	The Fragile Chain	Morecroft, Annie	
1954	The Wind in the Sails	Perret, Jacques	
1954	Caesar's Honour	Hepburn, Janet	
1954	The Letters of W. B. Yeats	Yeats, William Butler	Wade, Allan (editor)
1954	Prisoners' Bluff	Magener, Rolf	Creighton, Basil (translator)
1954	Call to Greatness	Stevenson, Adlai E.	
1954	The Bafut Beagles	Durrell, Gerald	Thompson, Ralph (illustrator)
1954	A Pinch of Pound Notes	Dingle, John	
1954	The Five Seasons	Eska, Karl	Kee, Robert (translator)
1954	The Voyage Alone in the Yacht 'Rob Roy'	John MacGregor	The Mariners Library No 24, Introduction by Arthur Ransome
1955	Son of Oscar Wilde	Holland, Vyvyan	
1955	Kurun around the World	Le Toumelin, Jacques-Yves	
1955	Tibetan Marches	Migot, André	Fleming, Peter (translator)
1955	The Last Sortie	Zand, Herbert	Woodhouse, C. M. (translator)
1955	The Moving Waters	Collis, John Stewart	
1955	Manuela	Woods, William	
1955	The Dreyfus Case	Chapman, Guy	
1955	The Iron Gate of Illyria	Sommelius, Torgny	
1955	The Wise Man From the West	Cronin, Vincent	
1955	The Film of Memory	Druon, Maurice	Budberg, Moura (translator)
1955	The Nature of Power: Civilization and Foreign Policy	Halle, Louis J.	
1955	The Road to Samarcand	O'Brian, Patrick	
1955	Mars in Capricorn: An Adventure and an Experience	Cross, Beverley	
1955	The Tall Dark Man	Chamberlain, Anne	
1955	Mirage in the Arctic	Mikkelsen, Ejnar	Michael, Maurice (translator)
1955	Two Thousand Fathoms Down	Houot, Georges, and Willm, Pierre	Bullock, Michael (translator), Cousteau, J-Y. (foreword), Tailliez, P. (introduction)
1955	Greek Entanglement	Myers, E. C. W.	
1955	Leopards in the Night	Muldoon, Guy	
1955	The West in My Eyes	van de Wiele, Annie	Young, Edward and Young, Diana (translators)
1955	Wordsworth: Poetry and Prose	Wordsworth, William	Merchant, W. Moelwyn (editor)
1955	Abode of Snow	Mason, Kenneth	
1955	Song at the Year's Turning: Poems, 1942–1954	Thomas, R. S.	Betjeman, John (introduction)
1955	The River Boy	Whistler, Theresa	
1955	The Lost Glacier	Styles, Showell	
1955	Hitler's Paper Weapon	Hottl, Wilhelm	Creighton, Basil (translator)
1955	All in Due Time	House, Humphry	Hough, Graham (editor)
1955	A House of the Rhine	Faviell, Frances	
1955	Early Light: Collected Poems	Wellesley, Dorothy	
1955	The Buried People: A Study of the Etruscan World	von Cles-Reden, Sibylle	Woodhouse, C. M. (translator)
1956	The Best of Friends: Further Letters to Sydney Carlyle Cockerell	various	Meynell, Viola (editor)
1956	Carlyle: Selected Works, Reminiscences, and Letters	Carlyle, Thomas	Symons, Julian (editor)
1956	Islands of Tomorrow	Elmberg, John-Erik	Walford, Naomi (translator)
1956	Spam Tomorrow	Anderson, Verily	
1956	In Time of Trouble	Cockburn, Claud	
1956	Bach and the Heavenly Choir	Ruber, Johannes	Michael, Maurice (translator)
1956	A Most Contagious Game	Grafton, Samuel	
1956	The Golden Ocean	O'Brian, Patrick	
1956	Lying in the Sun, and other Stories	O'Brian, Patrick	
1956	The Iron King	Druon, Maurice	
1956	Switch on the Night	Bradbury, Ray	Gekiere, Madeline (illustrator)
1956	The Siege of Nanga Parbat, 1856–1953	Bauer, Paul	Rickmers, R. W. (translator), Hunt, Sir John, (Preface)
1956	The Drunken Forest	Durrell, Gerald	Thompson, Ralph (illustrator)
1956	The Mermaids	Boros, Eva	
1956	What I Think	Stevenson, Adlai E.	
1956	The Reluctant Legionnaire: An Escapade	Alexander, Michael	
1956	The Lonely South	Migot, Andre	Graves, Richard (translator)
1956	The View from this Window	Whistler, Laurence	
1956	The October Country	Bradbury, Ray	
1956	My Aunt's Rhinoceros	Fleming, Peter	
1956	William Nicholson	Brouse, Lillian	
1956	The Nightwalkers	Cross, Beverley	
1956	G. M.: Memories of George Moore	Cunard, Nancy	
1956	Aristotle's Poetics	House, Humphry	Hardie, Colin (editor)
1956	Green with Beasts	Merwin, W. S.	
1956	The Letters of William Blake	Blake, William	Keynes, Geoffrey (editor)
1956	The Silver Kingdom	Garnett, Richard	Dickins, Jane (illustrator)
1956	The Strangled Queen	Druon, Maurice	Hare, Humphrey (translator)
1956	Books and Book-Collectors	Carter, John	
1956	The Soldier Room	Chamberlain, Anne	
1956	Potter on America	Potter, Stephen	
1956	Nine Bald Men	Cockburn, Claud	
1956	My Family and Other Animals	Durrell, Gerald	
1956	Pacific Ordeal	Ainslie, Kenneth	
1957	The Birth of Rowland	Lytton, Robert and Elizabeth	Lutyens, Emily, Lady (editor)
1957	A Bibliography of Frederick Rolfe, Baron Corvo	Woolf, Cecil	
1957	Margaret the First	Grant, Douglas	
1957	The Last Detachment: The Cadets of Saumer, 1940	Druon, Maurice	Hare, Humphrey (translator)
1957	Newman: Prose and Poetry	Newman, John Henry	Tillotson, Geoffrey (editor)
1957	All Through the Night	Vaughan, Richard	
1957	Life at Fonthill, 1807-1822: From the Correspondence of William Beckford	Beckford of Fonthill, William	Alexander, Boyd (editor)
1957	Two against the Ice	Mikkelsen, Ejnar	Michael, Maurice (translator)
1957	No Passport to Tibet	Bailey, F. M.	
1957	Union Street	Causley, Charles	
1957	The Enemy in the Heart	Jones, T. H.	
1957	The Last Migration	Cronin, Vincent	
1957	Three Hundred and Nine East, and A Night of Levitation	van Orden, Bianca	
1957	Invasion 1940: An Account of the German Preparations and the British Counter-Measures	Fleming, Peter	
1957	Cape of Storms	Popham, Hugh	
1957	The Poisoned Crown	Druon, Maurice	Hare, Humphrey (translator)
1957	The Trumpeting Herd	Muldoon, Guy	Thompson, Ralph (illustrator)
1957	A Noise in the Night	Jepson, Selwyn	
1957	Ark Royal, 1939–1941	Jameson, William	
1957	A. E. Housman: A Divided Life	Watson, George L.	
1957	The Spotted Deer	Williams, J. H., Colonel	
1957	Candles in the Sun	Lutyens, Emily, Lady	
1957	Our Square	Anderson, Verily	
1957	Letters to Lady Cunard, 1895–1933	Moore, George	Hart-Davis, Rupert (editor)
1957	Selected Letters of Henry James	James, Henry	Edel, Leon (editor)
1957	The Painter's Eye	James, Henry	Sweeney, John L. (editor)
1957	No Earthly Command	Calder-Marshall, Arthur	
1957	With the Guards to Mexico!	Fleming, Peter	
1957	Dandelion Wine	Bradbury, Ray	
1957	New America	Stevenson, Adlai E., Harris, Seymour E., Martin, John Bartlow, and Schlesinger, Arthur Jr.	
1957	The Golden Impala	Ropner, Pamela	
1957	The Spy's Bedside Book	various	Greene, Graham and Greene, Hugh (editors)
1957	Gervasutti's Climbs	Gervasutti, Giusto	Morin, Nea E. and Smith, Janet Adam (translator)
1957	A Sociable Plover	Linklater, Eric	
1957	The Sea is for Sailing	Pye, Peter	
1957	The True Blue	Alexander, Michael	
1957	A Bibliography of Virginia Woolf	Kirkpatrick, B. J.	
1958	The House of Fiction	James, Henry	Edel, Leon (editor)
1958	Doubting Thomas	Brebner, Winston	
1958	Georgian Afternoon	Jones, L. E.	
1958	– Letters	James, Henry and Wells, H. G.	Edel, Leon, and Ray, Gordon N. (editors)
1958	A Bibliography of the Writings of W. B. Yeats (2nd Edition)	Wade, Allan	
1958	A Bibliography of Henry James	Edel, Leon, and Laurence, Dan H.	
1958	The Royal Succession	Druon, Maurice	
1958	The Ride from Hell	Palmer, Herbert	
1958	The Man from Devil's Island	Calder-Marshall, Arthur	
1958	The Stories of Sean O'Faolain	O'Faolain, Sean	
1958	The Rainbow Comes and Goes	Cooper, Diana	
1958	Olympia and the Angel	Cavaliero, Roderigo	
1958	The Door Marked Malaya	Crawford, Oliver	
1958	Brighter than a Thousand Suns: The Moral and Political History of the Atomic Scientists	Jungk, Robert	Cleugh, James (translator)
1958	Parisian Sketches	James, Henry	Edel, Leon and Dusoir, Ilse (editors)
1958	Water Music	van Orden, Bianca	
1958	The Buttercup Children	Hesketh, Phoebe	
1958	Two Lakes	Brebner, Winston	
1958	Two Gold Rings	Davies, Margaret	
1958	Lost Summer	Davis, Christopher	
1958	Poetry for Supper	Thomas, R. S.	
1958	Cecilia: The Life and Letters of Cecilia Ridley, 1819–1845	Ridley, Cecilia	Ridley, Viscountess (editor)
1958	T. S. Eliot: A Symposium for his Seventieth Birthday	various	Braybrooke, Neville (editor)
1958	The Gower Street Poltergeist	Fleming, Peter	
1958	Pictures in the Fire	Collier, John	
1958	In the Cage	James, Henry	Zabel, Morton Dauwen (editor)
1958	Monsters and Marlinspikes	Popham, Hugh	Oakley, Graham (illustrator)
1958	Tistou of the Green Fingers	Druon, Maurice	Hare, Humphrey (translator)
1958	Max's Nineties	Beerbohm, Max	Lancaster, Osbert (introduction)
1958	J. B. Priestley	Hughes, David Y.	
1958	Andrew Young – Poems	Young, Andrew	Clark, Leonard (editor)
1958	Out of the World and Back	Young, Andrew	
1958	Sharks are Caught at Night	Poli, François	Walford, Naomi (translator)
1959	On the Track of Unknown Animals	Heuvelmans, Bernard	Garnett, Richard (translator)
1959	The Sky Above the Roof	Verlaine, Paul	Hill, Brian (translator)
1959	The Tangerine	de Rivoyre, Christine	Denny, Norman (translator)
1959	Havelock Ellis	Calder-Marshall, Arthur	
1959	To Be Young	Lutyens, Mary	
1959	The Skylark and other Poems	Hodgson, Ralph	Stone, Reynolds (illustrator)
1959	A Pearl to India: The Life of Roberto de Nobili	Cronin, Vincent	
1959	Fortune's Fool	de Nerval, Gerard	Hill, Brian (translator)
1959	The Day It Rained Forever	Bradbury, Ray	
1959	The Guitar	del Castillo, Michel	Hare, Humphrey (translator)
1959	The Sacred Fount	James, Henry	Edel, Leon (introduction)
1959	The Darkest Bough	Chamberlain, Anne	
1959	The Masterpiece and the Man: Yeats As I Knew Him	Gibbon, Monk	
1959	Once is Enough	Smeeton, Miles	
1959	The Light of Common Day	Cooper, Diana, Lady	
1959	The Siege at Peking	Fleming, Peter, Colonel	
1959	Child of the Twenties	Donaldson, Frances	
1959	The Unknown Shore	O'Brian, Patrick	
1959	Corridor of Honour	Fersen, Nicholas	
1959	Whistle the Wind	Shearwood, Kenneth	
1959	A Seal Flies	Pearson, R. H.	
1959	Big Charlie	Williams, J. H.	
1959	Woman's Estate	Napier, Mary	
1959	Engraved Glass, 1952–58	Whistler, Laurence	
1959	The Face of War	Gellhorn, Martha	
1959	Friends and Enemies	Stevenson, Adlai E.	
1959	The Lion	Kessel, Joseph	Green, Peter (translator)
1959	I Forgot to Tell You	Jones, L. E.	
1959	Mother Was Always in Love	van Rensselaer, Philip	
1959	Sealed with a Loving Kiss	Hughes, David	
1959	Burning Secret	McDonell, Gordon	
1959	The Curtain Falls	Druon, Maurice	Hare, Humphrey (translator)
1959	Dickens Incognito	Aylmer, Felix	
1959	The Fair to Middling	Calder-Marshall, Arthur	
1959	The White Spider	Harrer, Heinrich	Merrick, Hugh (translator)
1959	Steps to Immaturity: An Autobiography	Potter, Stephen	
1959	Scotty	Davis, Christopher	
1960	The Owl of Minerva	Regler, Gustav	
1960	The Witch	Hulton, Nika, Lady	
1960	A Snare for the Heart	de Rivoyre, Christine	Hare, Humphrey (translator)
1960	Shakespeare's Wooden O	Hotson, J. Leslie	
1960	Watch and Ward	James, Henry	
1960	The Living House	Ordish, George	
1960	The Hero Continues	Windham, Donald	
1960	Sickert	Browse, Lillian	
1960	The Answer to Life is No	anonymous	
1960	Arnold Bennett and H. G. Wells – Letters	Bennett, Arnold and Wells, H. G.	Wilson, Harris (editor)
1960	Alexander the God	Druon, Maurice	
1960	Gentlemen Convicts	Poli, François	Walford, Naomi (translator)
1960	When We Dead Awaken	Ibsen, Henrik	Meyer, Michael (translator)
1960	The Curse of the Misbegotten	Bowen, Croswell	
1960	Daughters of Divinity	Anderson, Verily	
1960	Songs of a Mad Prince	Jones, T. H.	
1960	The Lady from the Sea	Ibsen, Henrik	Meyer, Michael (translator)
1960	John Gabriel Borkman	Ibsen, Henrik	Meyer, Michael (translator)
1960	Brand	Ibsen, Henrik	Meyer, Michael (translator)
1960	The Collected Poems of Andrew Young	Young, Andrew, Canon	Clark, Leonard (editor)
1960	The She-Wolf of France	Druon, Maurice	Hare, Humphrey (translator)
1960	The Custard Boys	Rae, John	
1960	Stanley's Way	Sterling, Thomas	
1960	Trumpets from the Steep	Cooper, Diana, Lady	
1960	A Zoo in My Luggage	Durrell, Gerald	
1960	Tibet Is My Country	Norbu, Thubten Jigme and Harrer, Heinrich	Fitzgerald, Edward (translator)
1960	Hired to Kill	Morris, John	
1960	The Saving Remnant: An Account of Jewish Survival Since 1914	Agar, Herbert	
1960	The Warm Country	Windham, Donald	
1960	A Hundred Sonnets	Turner, Charles Tennyson	
1961	Lady Lytton's Court Diary, 1895–1899	Lutyens, Mary (editor)	
1961	There is a River	Vaughan, Richard	
1961	The Death of Tristan	del Castillo, Michel	Hare, Humphrey (translator)
1961	Bayonets to Lhasa	Fleming, Peter, Colonel	
1961	A Fly-Switch from the Sultan	Bates, Darrell	
1961	Gentle Enchanter	Gautier, Théophile	Hill, Brian (translator)
1961	The First Five Lives of Annie Besant	Nethercot, Arthur H.	
1961	The Bishop's Aunt	Jones, L. E.	
1961	How to Become a Musical Critic	Shaw, George Bernard	Laurence, Dan H. (editor)
1961	Roderick Hudson	James, Henry	
1961	The Scarlet Boy	Calder-Marshall, Arthur	
1961	A Sail in a Forest	Pye, Peter, Dr	
1961	George Gissing and H. G. Wells	Gissing, George and Wells, H. G.	Gettmann, R. A. (editor)
1961	Shake This Town	Williams, Robert V.	
1961	Guy Domville	James, Henry	Edel, Leon, (introduction)
1961	Geoffrey Keynes	Carter, John Waynflete (Contributor)	
1961	Goodbye to the Bombay Bowler	Fleming, Peter	
1961	An Anthology	Agate, James	van Thal, Herbert (editor)
1961	A Taste of the Hills	Smeeton, Miles	
1961	The Burial	Lash, Jennifer	
1961	The Hook: An Eye for an Eye	Katcha, Vahé	Torok, Alexander and Hughes, David (translator)
1961	The Shell at My Ear	Bates, Darrell	
1961	The Christening Party	Steegmuller, Francis	
1961	The Whiston Matter	Arnold, Ralph	
1961	The Horsehair Sofa	Hughes, David	
1961	The Franco-Prussian War	Howard, Michael	
1961	Gondolier	Marchant, William	
1961	Mischief among the Penguins	Tilman, H. W.	
1961	Roll of Honour	Linklater, Eric	
1961	Winter Shoes in Springtime	Smeeton, Beryl	
1961	The Whispering Land	Durrell, Gerald	Thompson, Ralph (illustrator)
1961	Tares	Thomas, R. S.	
1961	Audible Silence	Whistler, Laurence	
1961	The Lily and the Lion	Druon, Maurice	
1961	Horace Walpole	Lewis, W. S.	
1961	The Elusive Monster	Burton, Maurice, Dr	
1961	Words in Season	Brown, Ivor	
1961	Poor Kit Smart	Devlin, Christopher	
1962	East 57th Street	Jackson, Alan R.	
1962	Crimson Joy	Fenn, Charles	
1962	Platform and Pulpit	Shaw, George Bernard	Laurence, Dan H. (editor)
1962	The Pirates of the Brig 'Cyprus'	Clune, Frank	Stephensen, P. R.
1962	A Very Quiet War	Arnold, Ralph	
1962	Nights in the Gardens of Brooklyn	Swados, Harvey	
1962	The Matter with Ireland	Shaw, George Bernard	Greene, David H and Laurence, Dan H (editors)
1962	The Wreathed Head	de Rivoyre, Christine	O'Brian, Patrick (translator)
1962	I Remember! I Remember!	O'Faolain, Sean	
1962	The Complete Tales of Henry James (2 vols)	James, Henry	Edel, Leon (editor)
1962	Practise to Deceive	Bradshaw, George	
1962	Point of Departure	Ingersoll, Ralph	
1962	The Fleet that Jack Built	Jameson, William, Admiral	
1962	A Kid Nobody Wants	Kost, Robert	
1962	Sunk without Trace	Birley, Robert, Dr	
1962	The Letters of Oscar Wilde	Wilde, Oscar	Hart-Davis, Rupert (editor)
1962	Conversations with Stalin	Djilas, Milovan	Petrovich, Michael B. (translator)
1962	Trust in Chariots	Savage, Thomas	
1962	A Kind of Darkness	Davis, Christopher	
1962	Trepidation in Downing Street	Jones, L. E.	
1962	A Bibliography of Siegfried Sassoon	Keynes, Geoffrey, Sir	
1962	Don't Look Down	Katcha, Vahé	Hughes, David (translator)
1962	FitzGerald: Selected Works	FitzGerald, Edward	Richardson, Joanna (editor)
1962	The Poet and the Landscape	Young, Andrew, Canon	
1962	A Change of Jungles	Smeeton, Miles, Brigadier	
1962	The Marconi Scandal	Donaldson, Frances	
1962	Sherlock Holmes	Baring-Gould, William S., and Ketton-Cremer, R. W.	
1962	The Test: De Gaulle and Algeria	Sulzberger, C. L.	
1962	Through the Hoop	del Castillo, Michel	Wiles, Peter (translator)
1962	The Complete Tales of Henry James, vols III and IV	James, Henry	Edel, Leon (editor)
1962	Henry James: The Conquest of London, 1870–1883	Edel, Leon	
1963	The Sweeping Wind: A Memoir	de Kruif, Paul	
1963	A Bibliography of Lucretius	Gordon, Cosmo Alexander	
1963	A Winter in Nepal	Morris, John	
1963	The Tunnel under the Channel	Whiteside, Thomas	
1963	Unity's Children	Sterling, Thomas	
1963	Something Wicked this Way Comes	Bradbury, Ray	
1963	The Great Philosophers: The Foundations	Jaspers, Karl	Arendt, Hannah (editor) and Manheim, Ralph (translator)
1963	The Peace of Christmas Eve	Engelman, Fred L.	
1963	Orange Street and Brickhole Lane	Arnold, Ralph	
1963	The Commissioner	Dougherty, Richard	
1963	Sex, Culture, and Myth	Malinowski, B.	
1963	The American Establishment	Rovere, Richard H.	
1963	The Complete Tales of Henry James, vols V and VI	James, Henry	Edel, Leon (editor)
1963	Henry James: The Middle Years, 1884–1894	Edel, Leon	
1963	Human Conduct: An introduction to the Problems of Ethics	Hospers, John	
1963	A Seraph in a Box	Willson, Robina Beckles	Ambrus, Victor G. (illustrator)
1963	Lady Jane	Jamison, C. V.	Jacques, Robin (illustrator)
1963	A is for Anything	Barry, Katharina	
1963	A Bibliography of Ronald Firbank	Benkovitz, Miriam J.	
1963	The Doors of Stone: Poems, 1938–1962	Prince, F. T.	
1963	The Fate of Admiral Kolchak	Fleming, Peter	
1963	Nubian Twilight	Keating, Rex	
1963	Men and Nations: A World History	Mazour, Anatole G.	Peoples, John M.
1963	A Bibliography of D. H. Lawrence	Roberts, Warren	
1963	The Beast at the Door	Jones, T. H.	
1963	The Complete Tales of Henry James (2 vols)	James, Henry	Edel, Leon (editor)
1963	The Liberation of Paris	Thornton, Willis	
1963	The Last Four Lives of Annie Besant	Nethercot, Arthur H.	
1963	Bemba	Clair, Andrée	Ponsot, Marie (translator); Johnson, Harper (illustrator)
1963	The Tinsel November	Rhys, Julia	Barker, Carol (illustrator)
1963	The Mystery of Green Hill	Kusan, Ivan	Petrovich, Michael B. (translator); Adler, Kermit (illustrator)
1963	The White Dragon	Garnett, Richard	Oakley, Graham (illustrator)
1963	Summer in Ville-Marie	Daveluy, Paule	
1964	Hamlet's Divinity, and other Essays	Devlin, Christopher	Wedgwood, C. V. (introduction)
1964	A Bibliography of Ezra Pound	Gallup, Donald	
1964	A Longing for Quails	Bates, Darrell	
1964	The Bread of Truth	Thomas, R. S.	
1964	The Memoirs of Zeus	Druon, Maurice	Hare, Humphrey (translator)
1964	The Initials in the Heart	Whistler, Laurence	
1964	The General	Hulton, Nika, Lady	
1964	The Forest and the Bulldozer	Stubbs, Joanna	
1964	Pineapple Palace	Willson, Robina Beckles	Ambrus, Victor G. (illustrator)
1964	When the Earth Trembles	Tazieff, Haroun	O'Brian, Patrick (translator)
1964	Apollinaire: Poet among the Painters	Steegmuller, Francis	
1964	Mr W. H.	Hotson, J. Leslie	
1964	Scarlet Lancer	Lunt, James, Brigadier	
1964	The Drood Case	Aylmer, Felix	
1964	Letters to Reggie Turner	Beerbohm, Max	Hart-Davis, Rupert (editor)
1964	Europe in Renaissance and Reformation	Thomson, S. Harrison	
1964	I Come from the Stone Age	Harrer, Heinrich	Fitzgerald, Edward (translator)
1964	A Bibliography of the Foulis Press	Gaskell, Philip	
1965	The Odes of Horace	Horatius Flaccus, Quintus	Michie, James (translator)
1965	On the Heights	Bonatti, Walter	Edwards, Lovett Fielding (translator)
1965	The Will	Swados, Harvey	
1965	Vive Moi! An Autobiography	O'Faolain, Sean	
1965	The Inner Room	Randal, Vera	
1965	Short Stories since 1930	various	Morris, John I. (editor)
1965	A Man of Push and Go	Crow, Duncan	
1965	The Journey and the Pity	Mayewski, Pawel	
1965	The Devilish Plot	Hall, Aylmer	Holder, John (illustrator)
1965	The House of the Bittern	Ropner, Pamela	Williams, K. M. (illustrator)
1965	Eight Cousins	Alcott, Louisa	Shackell, Rodney (illustrator)
1965	Tigers in the Cellar	Fenner, Carol	
1965	The Diary of Alice James	James, Alice	Edel, Leon (editor)
1965	A Bibliography of E. M. Forster	Kirkpatrick, B. J.	
1965	Doings and Undoings: The Fifties and After in American Writing	Podhoretz, Norman	
1965	A Girl at Eton	Heygate, Elizabeth	
1965	John Buchan	Smith, Janet Adam	
1965	The Pakistani Agent	Robinson, Philip Bedford	
1965	The Garret	Crawford, Oliver	
1965	Love and Marriage	Ashford, Daisy, and Angela Ashford	Steadman, Ralph (illustrator)
1965	A Discreet Immortality	Smith, John	
1965	Mark Gertler: Selected Letters	Gertler, Mark	Carrington, Noel (editor)
1965	The Cloud Forest	North, Joan	Everest, Carol (illustrator)
1965	Anchors Wharf	Willson, Robina Beckles	Floyd, Gareth (illustrator)
1965	In Place of Katia	Kay, Mara	Ambrus, Victor G. (illustrator)
1965	The Far-Off Land	Caudill, Rebecca	
1965	Westminster School	Carleton, John D.	
1966	Bayonets at St Cloud: The Story of the 18th Brumaire	Goodspeed, D. J., Major	
1966	Calabrian Summer	Gunnell, Bryn	
1966	Youth in New Society	Winnicott, D. W. and others	Raison, Timothy (editor)
1966	Victim of Duty: A Study of James Forrestal	Rogow, Arnold A.	
1966	Castle Blair	Shaw, Flora	Everest, Carol (illustrator)
1966	Jazz Country	Hentoff, Nat	
1966	The Year Round	Clark, Leonard	Ardizzone, Edward (illustrator)
1966	Wild Swans at Suvanto	Jenkins, Alan	Frankenberg, Robert (illustrator)
1966	Out of Hiding	Weatherby, W. J.	
1966	A Story for Teddy and others	Swados, Harvey	
1966	Colossus	Jones, D. F.	
1966	A Bibliography of Edmund Burke	Todd, William B.	
1966	Pieta	Thomas, R. S.	
1966	The Invisibles	Huxley, Francis	
1966	ABC for Book-collectors	Carter, John	
1966	Theresa: The Story of the Yelverton Case	Crow, Duncan	
1966	The Guardian Angel	Ropner, Pamela	Bewley, Sheila (illustrator)
1966	The Burning Candle	Kay, Mara	Carey, Penny (illustrator)
1966	Jack of Dover	Garnett, Richard	Oakley, Graham (illustrator)
1966	Ten from Tomorrow	Tubb, E. C.	
1966	The Furies	Roberts, Keith	
1966	The Heat of the Sun	O'Faolain, Sean	
1966	Prayer For Sun	Hesketh, Phoebe	
1966	Ludendorff: Soldier, Dictator, Revolutionary	Goodspeed, D. J.	
1967	Rossetti and the Pre-Raphaelite Brotherhood, vol I	Fleming, G. H.,	
1967	Woman of Violence	Cohen, Geula	Halkin, Hilliel (translator)
1967	Manchester	Sanders, John	Floyd, Gareth (illustrator)
1967	Ballantyne the Brave	Quayle, Eric	
1967	The Carpenter Years	Cohen, Arthur A.	
1967	A Massacre of Innocents	Brennan, Christopher	
1967	The Wandering Jew and other Stories	Apollinaire, Guillaume	Hall, Remy Inglis (translator); Little, Anthony (illustrator)
1967	Death is a Dream	Tubb, E. C.	
1967	The New Poly-Olbion	Young, Andrew, Canon	
1967	To Celebrate Her Living	Whistler, Laurence	
1967	Senator Fulbright	Coffin, Tristram	
1967	The First Summer	Crow, Duncan	
1967	Moss on the North Side	Wilkinson, Sylvia	
1967	The Great Philosophers, vol II	Jaspers, Karl Arendt, Hannah (editor)	Manheim, Ralph (translator)
1967	The Pacifist Conscience	Mayer, Peter (editor)	
1967	O Canada	Wilson, Edmund	
1967	Implosion	Jones, D. F.	
1967	The Moving Target	Merwin, W. S.	
1967	Black Light	Kinnell, Galway	
1967	The Successors	Irving, Laurence	
1967	The Bratsk Station, and other Poems	Yevtushenko, Yevgeny	Tupikina-Glaessner, Tina, and Dutton, Geoffrey (translators)
1967	Europe Without Baedeker	Wilson, Edmund	
1968	The Night's Prison	Morgan, Robert	
1968	The Dying Stallion, and other Stories	Urquhart, Fred	
1968	The Dream Master	Zelazny, Roger	
1968	Gath	Tubb, E. C.	
1968	Tiriel	Blake, William	Bentley, Gerald Eades (editor)
1968	Songs of Innocence and Experience	Blake, William	Keynes, Geoffrey, Sir (editor)
1968	Ezra Pound	Reck, Michael	
1968	Henrik Ibsen: The Making of a Dramatist, 1828–1864	Meyer, Michael	
1968	Youth and Age	Turgenev, Ivan Sergeievich	Mainwaring, Marion (translator)
1968	Sea-Green Magic	Beresford, Elisabeth	Tout, Ann (illustrator)
1968	The Gangster Girl	Campert, Remco	Scott, John (translator)
1968	S is for Space	Bradbury, Ray	
1968	R is for Rocket	Bradbury, Ray	
1968	E. M. Forster	Brander, Laurence	
1968	A Radical at Large: American Essays	Swados, Harvey	
1968	William James	Allen, Gay Wilson	
1968	Making It	Podhoretz, Norman	
1968	The Commentary Reader	Podhoretz, Norman (editor)	
1968	A Summer's Reckoning	Roche, Lise	
1968	FitzRoy of the Beagle	Mellersh, H. E. L.	
1968	Sofka	Skipwith, Sofka	
1968	How to Make Enemies	Duncan, Ronald	
1968	The Sea, Ships, and Sailors	Cole, William (editor)	
1969	The Lilywhite Boys	Poole, Josephine	
1968	Not That he Brought Flowers	Thomas, R. S.	
1968	Dinner Is Served: A History of Dining in England, 1400–1900	Brett, Gerard	
1969	The Lost Theatres of London	Mander, Raymond, and Mitchenson, Joe	
1969	Poetry and Prose	Cowper, William	Spiller, Brian (editor)
1969	The Poet Assassinated	Apollinaire, Guillaume	Padgett, Ron (translator); Dine, Jim (illustrator)
1969	The Lure of the Limerick	Baring-Gould, William S.	
1969	The Ruin of Sir Walter Scott	Quayle, Eric	
1969	The American Scene	James, Henry	Edel, Leon (editor)
1969	The Letters of William Blake	Blake, William	Keynes, Geoffrey, Sir (editor)
1969	The Marvellous Chance	Edwards, Francis	
1969	In the Wake of the Sea-Serpents	Heuvelmans, Bernard	Garnett, Richard (translator)
1969	Echo Round His Bones	Disch, Thomas M.	
1969	The Lice	Merwin, W. S.	
1969	Over the Alps	Anderson, Patrick	
1969	Bernardo O'Higgins and the Independence of Chile	Clissold, Stephen	
1969	The Four-Gated City	Lessing, Doris	
1969	Desperate Breakaway	Pope, Ray	Floyd, Gareth (illustrator)
1969	The Gold Dog	de Roo, Anne	
1969	A Bibliography of Ezra Pound	Gallup, Donald	
1969	The Bloodybacks	Hargreaves, Reginald, Major	
1969	A Wreath for Garibaldi	Garrett, George	
1969	The Turning Sky	Tremayne, Sydney	
1969	Curzon in India, vol I: Achievement	Dilks, David	
1969	The Perfect Mistress	Duncan, Ronald	
1969	The Fool's Heart	Roche, Lise	
1969	The Time Dweller	Moorcock, Michael	
1969	More Theatres: 1898–1903	Beerbohm, Max	
1969	Henry James: The Treacherous Years, 1895-1901	Edel, Leon, Dr	
1969	The Poems of Catullus	Catullus	Michie, James (translator); Rowland, Robert (introduction)
1969	Guy Fawkes: The Real Story of the Gunpowder Plot?	Hill, R. H. (Reginald Harrison Hill) (Contributor)	
1969	Alibi for a Corpse	Lemarchand, Elizabeth	
1969	Too Quick Despairer	Williams, David Ffrangcon	
1970	Curzon in India, vol II: Frustration	Dilks, David, Dr	
1970	The Fifty Days	Duhamel, Jean	Hall, R. A. (translator)
1970	Done this Day: The European Idea in Action	Crawford, Oliver	
1970	The Universal Baseball Association Inc., J. Henry Waugh, Prop.	Coover, Robert	
1970	Fat City	Gardner, Leonard	
1970	The God of the Labyrinth	Wilson, Colin	
1970	The Inner Wheel	Roberts, Keith	
1970	In the Prison of her Skin	Leduc, Violette	Coltman, Derek (translator)
1970	Man's Dominion	Caver, Mavis	
1970	One Morning in the War	Hammer, Richard	
1970	Papillon	Charrière, Henri	O'Brian, Patrick (translator)
1970	Freud: Founder of Psycho-Analysis	McGlashan, A. M. and Reeve, C. J.	
1970	Aldous Huxley: A Critical Study	Brander, Laurence	
1970	Last Theatres	Beerbohm, Max	Hart-Davis, Rupert (editor)
1970	Captains Without Eyes	Kirkpatrick, Lyman B. Jr	
1970	The Long Sonata of The Dead	Robinson, Michael F.	
1971	The Converts	Torres, Tereska	
1971	Sexual Politics	Millett, Kate	
1971	Collected Poems	Stevenson, Robert Louis	Smith, Janet Adam (editor)
1971	Death on Doomsday	Lemarchand, Elizabeth	
1971	Roman Trier and the Treveri	Wightman, Edith Mary	
1971	Xavier	Heslop, Richard and Taylor, Bob	
1971	Love	Carter, Angela	
1971	The Oppenheimer Case: Security on Trial	Stern, Philip M. and Green, Harold P.	
1971	Wolves in the City: The Death of French Algeria	Henissart, Paul	
1971	Gibraltar: The History of a Fortress	Bradford, Ernle	
1971	Henrik Ibsen, vol II: The Farewell to Poetry	Meyer, Michael	
1971	Henrik Ibsen, vol III: The Top of a Cold Mountain	Meyer, Michael	
1971	Thomas Mann	Hollingdale, R. J.	
1971	Clancy	Mullally, Frederic	
1971	Education in Evolution: Church, State, Society and Popular Education, 1800–1870	Hurt, John	
1971	Latin America: From Conquest to Independence	Fisher, John R.	Judge, Colin (maps)
1971	The Letters of A.E. Housman	Housman, A. E.	Maas, Henry (editor)
1971	Stalin: The History of a Dictator	Hyde, H. Montgomery	
1972	Mozart's Concerto Form	Forman, Denis	
1972	A History of Mexico	Cheetham, Nicolas, Sir	
1972	Peace for Our Time	Parkinson, Roger	
1972	The Earth and Its Satellite	various	Guest, John (editor)
1972	English Poetry, 1900–1950	Sisson, C. H.	
1972	The Surrogate	Catling, Patrick Skene	
1972	The Infernal Desire Machines of Doctor Hoffman	Carter, Angela	
1972	Operation Portland	Houghton, Harry	
1972	Disease and History	Cartwright, Frederick F., and Biddiss, Michael D.	
1972	ABC for Book Collectors	Carter, John	
1972	Henry James: The Master, 1901–1916	Edel, Leon	
1972	Arms and Armour, 1660–1918	Shepperd, G. A.	
1972	The Warsaw Uprising: 1 August–2 October 1944	Bruce, George	
1972	Bonnie Prince Charlie	McLaren, Moray	
1972	The General Strike	Farman, Christopher	
1972	Franco's Prisoner	Garcia, Miguel	
1972	The Oil Barons: Men of Greed and Grandeur	O'Connor, Richard	
1972	Order of Assassins: The Psychology of Murder	Wilson, Colin	
1973	Murderous Providence	Rothman, Harry	
1973	Blood, Toil, Tears and Sweat: The War History from Dunkirk to Alamein, Based on the War Cabinet Papers of 1940–1942	Parkinson, Roger	
1973	The Ice Age	Kurten, Bjorn	
1973	Journals of Resistance	Theodorakis, Mikis	Webb, Graham (translator)
1973	Memoirs of an Ex-Prom Queen	Shulman, Alix Kates	
1973	The Epigrams of Martial	Martial	Michie, James (translator and editor)
1973	Albert Einstein: Creator and Rebel	Hoffmann, Banesh	Dukas, Helen
1973	The Battleship Era	Padfield, Peter	
1973	The Devil Tree	Kosinski, Jerzy	
1973	Rambling Rose	Willingham, Calder	
1973	The Peninsular War	Parkinson, Roger	
1973	The Seven Years War	Furneaux, Rupert	
1973	The Man in the Middle	Atkinson, Hugh	
1973	Banco: The Further Advancement of Papillon	Charrière, Henri	O'Brian, Patrick (translator)
1973	Three Popes and A Cardinal	Martin, Malachi	
1973	Kiss Me Goodnight, Sergeant-Major	Page, Martin (editor)	Tidy, Bill (illustrator)
1973	Baldwin: The Unexpected Prime Minister	Hyde, H. Montgomery	
1974	The Conquest of Cancer	Wilkinson, James	
1974	The Colonial Revolution	Brockway, A. Fenner	
1974	Stories and Plays	O'Brien, Flann	
1974	Lord Esher	Fraser, Peter	
1974	Getting into Death	Disch, Thomas M.	
1974	Out of the Garden	MacInnes, Colin	
1974	Selected Poems, 1946–1968	Thomas, R. S.	
1974	The Assassination of Heydrich	Ivanov, Miroslav	O'Brian, Patrick (translator)
1974	Earth's Voyage through Time	Dineley, David	
1974	Organized Knowledge: A Sociological View of Science and Technology	Sklair, Leslie	
1974	The Clockwork Testament, or Enderby's End	Burgess, Anthony	
1974	A Day's March Nearer Home: The War History from Alamein to VE Day Based on War Cabinet Papers of 1942–1945	Parkinson, Roger	
1974	The Schoolgirl Murder Case	Wilson, Colin	
1974	Hazard	Browne, Gerald A.	
1974	Crack-Up	Atkinson, Hugh	
1974	The Best American Short Stories12	Foley, Martha (editor)	
1974	Man and Beast	Willis, Roy	Douglas, Mary (editor)
1974	Jessie Matthews: a Biography	Thornton, Michael	
1974	The Formation of England, 550–1042	Finberg, H. P. R.	
1974	The Great Naval Race: The Anglo-German Naval Rivalry, 1900–1914	Padfield, Peter	
1974	Hitler's Rise to Power: The Nazi Movement in Bavaria, 1923–1933	Pridham, Geoffrey	
1974	The Great British Picture Show	Perry, George	
1974	Let's Go Play at the Adams'	Johnson, Mendal W.	
