= Elephant bridge =

Elephant bridge may refer to:

- Elephant bridge, bridge whose construction depends on elephant labor
- Elephant Bridge, 1957 children's novel by Jeffrey Potter

== See also ==
- Elephant Bridge Hotel in Darlington, Victoria, Australia, known for its pub
- Elephants' Bridge, within Chester Zoo in England
