= 15th Locarno Film Festival =

Film festival in Locarno, Switzerland

- Location: Locarno, Switzerland
- Founded: 1946
- Awards: Golden Sail: The Winner directed by François Reichenbach
- Festival date: Opening: 18 July 1962; Closing: 29 July 1962
- Website: Locarno Film Festival

Locarno Film Festival
- 16th 14th

The 15th Locarno Film Festival was held from 18 to 29 July 1962 in Locarno, Switzerland. Retrospective screenings were held in tribute to King Vidor and Jean Vigo.

The top prize at the festival, the Golden Sail, went to The Winner directed by François Reichenbach. while the second prize went to Reach for Glory.

== Official Sections ==
The following films were screened in these sections:

=== Main Program ===
==== Feature Films In Competition ====
Highlighted title indicates winner of the Golden Sail

Original Title	English Title	Director(s)	Year	Production Country
Anni Ruggenti	Roaring Years	Luigi Zampa	1962	Italia
Baron Pasil	The Fabulous Baron Munchausen	Karel Zeman	1961	Czech Republic
Cudna Devojka	A Strange Girl	Jovan Zivanovic	1962	Yugoslavia
Dablova Past	The Devil's Trap	Frantisek Vlacil	1961	Czech Republic
En El Balcon Vacìo	In the Vacant Balcony	Jorni Garcia Ascot	1961	Mexico
Et Morte La Mort	And Died Death	Vergnes Gilbert	1962	Morocco
Fils D'Imana	Son of Iana	Eric Weyemeersch	1959	Belgium
Gongehovdingen	The Gongehovding	Hannelise Hovmand	1961	Denmark
Kabuliwala	Kabuli	Hemen Gupta	1961	India
Leoni Al Sole	Lions in the Sun	Vittorio Caprioli	1961	Italia
Lulu		Rolf Thiele	1962	Austria
Moshi Moshi, Hallo Japan	Hello Hello, Hallo Japan	Hans H. Hermann, Walter Knoop	1961	Germany, Japan
Mörderspiel	Murder Party	Helmuth Ashely	1961	Germany, France
Nepal		Willi Nötzli		Switzerland
Reach For Glory		Philip Leacock	1962	Great Britain
The Reluctant Saint		Edward Dmytryk	1962	USA
Un Coeur Gros Comme Ça	The Winner	François Reichenbach	1962	France
Un Singe En Hiver	A Monkey in Winter	Henri Verneuil	1962	France
Una Vita Difficile	A Difficult Life	Dino Risi	1961	Italia
Voskrezenie	Resurrection	Mikhail Chveitzer	1960	Russia
War Hunt		Denis Sanders	1962	USA
Wyrok	Judgment	Jerzy Passendorfer	1962	Poland

==== Short Films In Competition ====
Original Title	English Title	Director(s)	Year	Production Country
... Y Llegò La Cigüeña	... and the Stork Arrived	Cristino Anwander		Spain
Bijeli Mis	White Miss	Ivo Vrbanic		Yugoslavia
Biliar	Bile	Břetislav Pojar		Czech Republic
Bios		Branco Marjanovic		Yugoslavia
Bolshoe Serdze	Big Heart	Marianna Semenova		Russia
Cmentarz Remu	Remu Cemetery	Edward Etler		Poland
Crossing The Delaware		Art Bartsch		USA
Erasmus, The Voice Of Reason		Jan Hulsker		Netherlands
Gente Di Trastevere	People of Trastevere	Michele Gandin		Italia
Kineettisiä Kuvia	Kinetic Pictures	Eino Ruutsalo		Finland
Krippenspiel	Crib Game	Walter Marti, Reni Mertens		Switzerland
Kutter	Cutter	Marcel Franziskus		Luxembourg
La Femme Et L'Animal	The Woman and the Animal	Fèri Farzaneh		France
La Taranta	The Taranta	Gianfranco Mingozzi		Italia
Laminas De Almahue	Almahue Sheets	Sergio Bravo Ramos		Chile
Le Jeu De L'Hiver	Winter Game	Jean Dansereau, Bernard Gosselin		Canada
Les Dayaks, Chasseurs De Tetes	Dayaks, Head Hunters	Georges Bourdelon		France
Los Zamuros	The Zamuros	José Martin		Venezuela
Marrakech 51		Guido Franco		Switzerland
Monaco		Eugène Deslaw		Monaco
Ne Rasbrani Igri	Not a Crucified Game	Janosh Vasoc		Bulgaria
Ohne Datum	Without Date	Ottomar Domnick		Germany
Our Feathered Friend		Gopalt Datt		India
Peanut Battle		Connie Rasinsky		USA
Regard Sur La Folie	Look at Madness	Mario Ruspoli		France
Sinaia	Rail	Ivan Lengyel		Israel
The Apple		George Dunning		Great Britain
The Barranca Story		Lamberto V. Avellana		Philippines
The Return		Harles Jones		Great Britain
They Took Us To Sea		John Krish		Great Britain
Une Nation Est Nee	A Nation is Nee	Paulin Soumarou Vieyra		Senegal
Viale Dei Piopponi	Viale Dei Popponi	Gianfranco Mingozzi		Italia
Ösz	Autumn	Zsolt Kézdi-Kovacs		Hungary

=== Out of Competition (Fuori Concorso) ===
Main Program / Feature Films Out of Competition

Original Title	English Title	Director(s)	Year	Production Country
Divorzio All'Italiana	Divorce Italian Style	Pietro Germi	1961	Italia
Do Widzenia Do Jutra	Goodbye until Tomorrow	Janusz Morgenstern	1960	Poland
El Angel Exterminador	The Exterminating Angel	Luis Buñuel	1962	Mexico
Les Jovenes Viejos	Young Young People	Rodofo Kuhn	1962	Argentina
O Pagador De Promessas	The Promise Payer	Anselmo Duarte	1961	Brazil
Salvatore Giuliano		Francesco Rosi	1962	Italia
Samos I En Spegel	Samos in a Mirror	Ingmar Bergman	1961	Sweden
Sanjuro		Akira Kurosawa		Japan
Voyage-Surprise	Voyage	Pierre Prévert	1947	France

Short Films Out of Competition

Original Title	English Title	Director(s)	Production Country
Radiazioni	Radiation	Ernesto Tracatelli	Italia
Zoo		Bert Haanstra	Netherlands

=== Special Sections - Tribute to ===
Tribute To Jean Vigo (1905-1934)
Original Title	English Title	Director(s)	Year	Production Country
A Propos De Nice	About Nice	Jean Vigo	1929	France
L'Atalante	The Atalante	Jean Vigo		France
Tasis		Jean Vigo	1931	France
Zero De Conduite	Driving Zero	Jean Vigo		France
Tribute To King Vidor
Duel In The Sun		King Vidor	1946	United States
Hallelujah		King Vidor	1929	United States
Our Daily Bread		King Vidor	1934	United States
Salomon And Sheba		King Vidor	1959	United States
The Big Parade		King Vidor	1925	United States
The Citadel		King Vidor	1938	Great Britain
The Crowd		King Vidor	1928	United States
Three Wise Fools		King Vidor	1923	United States

== Official Awards ==
=== International Jury, feature films ===
- Golden Sail: THE WINNER by François Reichenbach
- Silver Sail: ROARING YEARS by Luigi Zampa, WAR HUNT by Denis Sanders, The Fabulous Baron Munchausen by Karel Zeman, REACH FOR GLORY by Philip Leacock

=== International Jury, short films ===
- Golden Sail, Short Films: GENTE DI TRASTEVERE by Michele Gandin
- Silver Sail, Short Films: CMENTARZ REMU by Edward Etler
- Special Mention, best art film, short films: LA FEMME ET L’ANIMAL Fèri Farzaneh
- Best Animation Film, Short Films: LOS ZAMUROS by José Martin,THE APPLE by George Dunning

=== FIPRESCI Jury ===
- FIPRESCI Jury Mention: RESURRECTION by Mikhail Chveitzer, DABLOVA PAST by Frantisek Vlacil
- FIPRESCI Award: EN EL BALCON VACÌO, by Jorni Garcia Ascot
