= Mellersh =

Mellersh is a surname. Notable people with the surname include:

- Francis Mellersh (cricketer) (1786–1849), English amateur cricketer
- Francis Mellersh (RAF officer), KBE, AFC (1898–1955), Royal Naval Air Service aviator, flying ace, senior commander in the Royal Air Force
- H. E. L. Mellersh (1897–1980), British author, primarily of text books

== See also ==
- Meller
