= Reach for Glory =

1962 British film by Philip Leacock

- Lobby card
- Directed by: Philip Leacock
- Written by: John Rae (novel)
- Produced by: Jud Kinberg; John Kohn
- Starring: Harry Andrews; Kay Walsh
- Cinematography: Bob Huke
- Edited by: Frederick Wilson
- Music by: Bob Russell
- Production company: Blazer Films
- Distributed by: Columbia Pictures
- Release date: April 1962 (UK)
- Running time: 86 minutes
- Country: United Kingdom
- Language: English

Reach for Glory is a 1962 British film directed by Philip Leacock and starring Harry Andrews, Kay Walsh and Michael Anderson Jr. It was adapted by John Rae from his 1961 novel The Custard Boys.

== Plot ==
A group of boys, evacuated during World War II from London to a coastal town, form a gang and play war games. Too young to fight in the war and afraid it will be over by the time they come of age, the group members, who are also in the school's Army Cadet Force, initiate a battle with the local teenagers. Curlew, a local youth, invites an Austrian Jewish refugee with whom he has formed a close relationship to take part in the shenanigans. At first the Jewish boy, Stein, is scorned because of his "Germanic" heritage but is later allowed to join. When Stein runs off during a fight, the youths decide to give him a fake court-martial and execution, but real bullets are used by a freak mistake and Stein is killed.

== Cast ==
- Harry Andrews as Capt. Curlew
- Kay Walsh as Mrs. Curlew
- Michael Anderson Jr as Lewis Craig
- Oliver Grimm as Mark Stein
- Martin Tomlinson as John Curlew
- Freddie Eldrett as Willy Aldrich
- James Luck as Michael Freen
- John Coker as Peter Joy
- Michael Trubshawe as Maj. Burton
- Arthur Hewlett as vicar
- Cameron Hall as headmaster
- Allan Jeayes as Crabtree
- Richard Vernon as Dr. Aldrich
- Russell Waters as Mr. Freeman
- Patricia Hayes as Mrs. Freeman
- George Pravda as Mr. Stein
- John Rae as Lance Freeman
- Alexis Kanner as Steven
- Peter Furnell as Arthur Chettle
- John Pike as Felix
- Melvin Baker as Chettle's Lieutenant

== Critical reception ==
The Monthly Film Bulletin wrote: "The harm which the chauvinistic military propaganda necessary to sustain even the most righteous cause can have on unsophisticated minds is demonstrated with dramatic economy in this adaptation from John Rae's much-praised novel. By deleting most of the author's side remarks on religion and patriotism and his social comment, including a superfluous ironic epilogue, it concentrates the better on this single theme from which so many more criticisms of the death-or-glory ethos follow. Yet even after some inevitable bowdlerisation, the film's producers had difficulty in finding a British distributor for a work where there is nothing coy or quaint about the children or their war games, little humour and that often coarse or bitter, and no conventional sex, only devotion to one apparently still disturbing message. The naturalness of the boys' playing is a further tribute to the patience and sensitivity of Philip Leacock when handling young actors. Unfortunately the two main adult characters, the Curlew parents, become pasteboard types when taken from page to screen, and the presence of a conscientious objector son seems just too pat a device. The narrative also skips over several significant topics, such as the upsetting effect of parental rows on the younger son, the attitude of the pupils to Mark's teacher father, and the ease with which Craig's gang accept Mark, whom they have at first ferociously snubbed. Better shaping of the script might have made the film even more compact and incisive than it already is."

The New Statesman wrote:"Sited on John Rae's novel, The Custard Boys, the ramshackle result is strongest when it glares at the beastliness and affections of undirected youth, the animal years of adolescence. The kids, sent from London to a Suffolk village, hunt down cats on bicycles and, ultimately, a gentle young Jewish refugee. Some of this comes over forcibly enough to be affecting (Oliver Grimm and Martin Tomlinson are well directed as the principal children), but too much of the surround wavers: not just anachronistic TV aerials but uncertain amateurism from the other juveniles and dread lines dealt out to such persevering adults as Harry Andrews and Kay Walsh. Where, oh where, is Peter Brook's Lord of the Flies and will it catch the real, rampaging image of cruel boyhood that this mostly blurs?"

Variety wrote: "Despite its worthy intentions, this fails to hit its target cleanly. It looks at war through the eyes of a bunch of London youngsters evacuated to the country during the last World War. ...These are the ingredients of a screenplay which is never quite decisive enough. ... Bob Huke's camerawork is sound and the location sequences are well portrayed. But the overall effect is of a good idea gone wrong through too many muddled motives battling against each other. It never knows what it wants to say, and gives up on the attempt."

== Accolades ==
The film won a Silver Sail award at the 1962 15th Locarno Film Festival, and received the United Nations Award "for the best Film embodying one or more of the principles of the United Nations Charter" at the 1963 BAFTAs.
