= Elephant-built bridge =

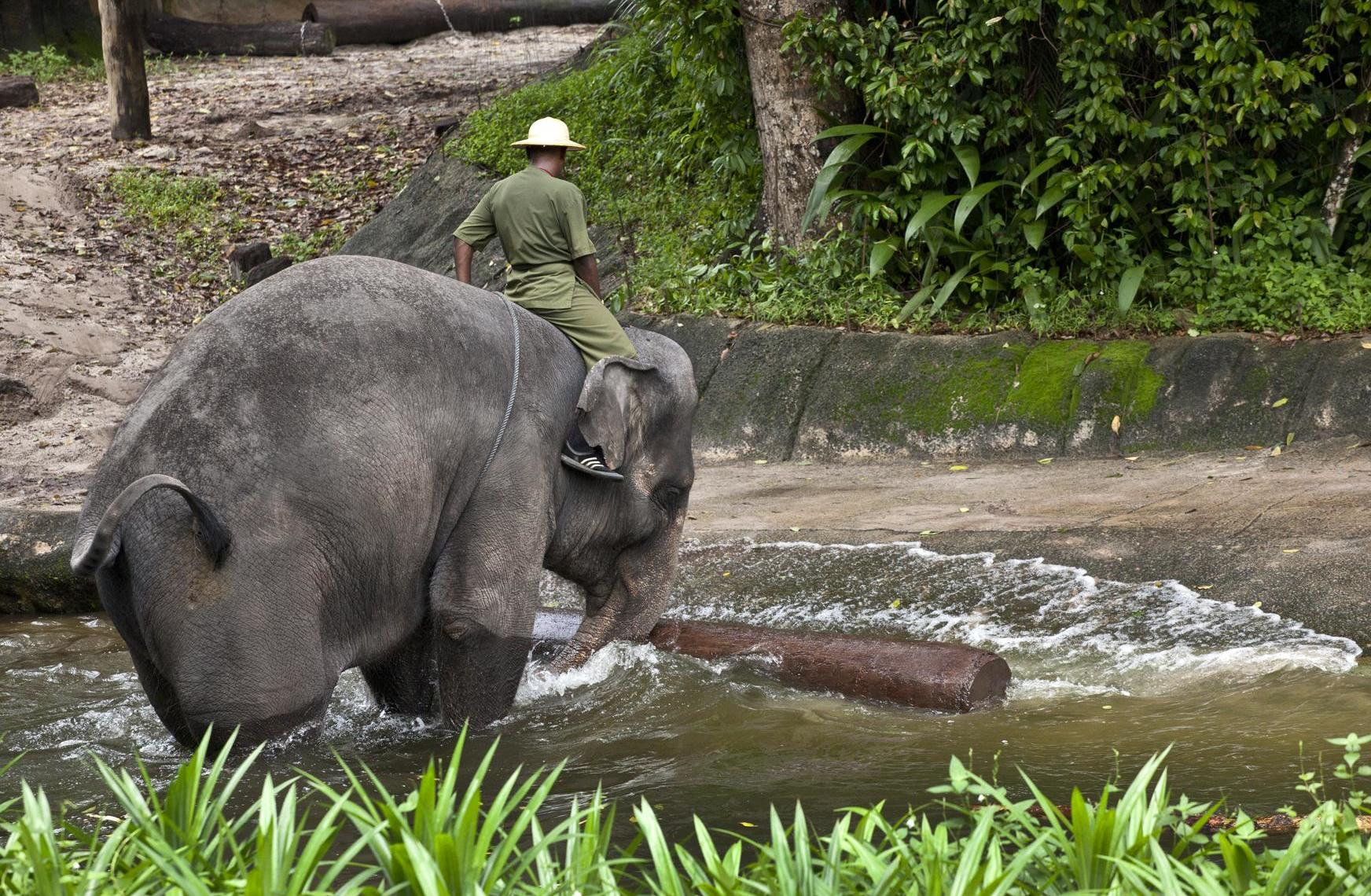
An elephant pushing a log into a stream

An elephant bridge, in the sense of a bridge built largely by elephants working under skilled human supervision, is a bridge whose structure consists primarily of logs, that are both carried to the site and put in place, by domesticated Indian elephants. Typically they are built in conjunction with logging operations in South and Southeast Asia.

Elephant bridges were built for military purposes in World War II by the Allies in the China Burma India Theater, and operations behind the lines of invading Japanese troops were undertaken to move elephants and elephant handlers to behind Allied lines. The native personnel involved, and the elephants, were, before the arrival of Japanese forces, largely engaged in the logging of teak for export. The British soldier James Howard "Elephant Bill" Williams, who oversaw the evacuation, had worked in the Burma teak trade; the success of the operation is said to have hinged on his long-standing personal relationship with one particularly large elephant.
