= Sweet Deception =

1972 film

- Directed by: Édouard Molinaro
- Written by: Christine de Rivoyre; Édouard Molinaro
- Based on: La mandarine by Christine de Rivoyre
- Produced by: Robert Bradford; Léo L. Fuchs
- Starring: Annie Girardot; Philippe Noiret; Madeleine Renaud
- Cinematography: Claude Lecomte
- Edited by: Monique Isnardon; Robert Isnardon
- Music by: Claude Bolling
- Production companies: Franco London Films; Filmes Cinematografica; Produzione Aldebaran
- Distributed by: S.N. Prodis
- Release date: 17 March 1972
- Running time: 84 minutes
- Countries: France; Italy
- Language: French

Sweet Deception (French: La mandarine) is a 1972 French-Italian comedy film directed by Édouard Molinaro and starring Annie Girardot, Philippe Noiret and Madeleine Renaud. It was shot at the Billancourt Studios in Paris and on location around the city, including at the Tuileries Garden and Hôtel Lancaster. The film's sets were designed by the art director François de Lamothe.

== Synopsis ==
The plot revolves around a small hotel in Paris run by the family of Madame Boulard. The arrival of the charming young Englishman Tony complicates their various relationships.

== Cast ==
- Annie Girardot as Séverine
- Philippe Noiret as Georges
- Madeleine Renaud as Madame Boulard dite Mémé Boul'
- Murray Head as Antony 'Tony' Bellay-Vanguard
- Marie-Hélène Breillat as Baba
- Jean-Claude Dauphin as Alain
- Robert Berri as Le client qui dîne
- Madeleine Damien as Augustine - la femme de chambre
- Nane Germon as La sage-femme
- Pippo Merisi as Le maître d'hotel
- Jacques Provins as Arsène - le concierge
- Jean Roquel as Gaston - le garçon d'étage
- Marthe Villalonga as La bonne espagnole
- Lionel Vitrant as Le garagiste

== Bibliography ==
- Mérigeau, Pascal Annie Girardot. Éditions PAC, 1978.
- Rège, Philippe. Encyclopedia of French Film Directors, Volume 1. Scarecrow Press, 2009.
