= The Old Boys' Network =

2009 book by John Rae

The Old Boys' Network: A Headmaster's Diaries 1970–1986
- The cover of the first edition, showing Little Dean's Yard, part of Westminster School.
- Author: John Rae
- Language: English
- Genre: Autobiography
- Publisher: Short Books
- Publication date: 2 April 2009
- Publication place: United Kingdom
- Media type: Print (hardback)
- Pages: 352
- ISBN: 978-1-906021-63-4
- OCLC: 298600374
- LC Class: LA2375.G72 R35 2009

The Old Boys' Network: A Headmaster's Diaries 1970–1986 is the 2009 autobiography by the late headmaster of Westminster School, John Rae. It consists of the journal he kept for most of the period in which he was headmaster of Westminster School (1972–1986), edited by him shortly before his death in December 2006, aged 75. It was published by Short Books on 2 April 2009. It was serialised as BBC Radio 4's Book of the Week from 30 March to 3 April 2009, read by Tim Pigott-Smith.

== See also ==
- Westminster School
- John Rae
