= Kay Dick =

English writer (1915–2001)

- Born: Kathleen Elsie; 29 July 1915; London, England
- Died: 19 October 2001 (aged 86); Brighton, Sussex, England
- Other name: Edward Lane
- Education: Lycée Français
- Occupations: Journalist, writer, novelist, biographer
- Notable work: They (1977)
- Website: kaydick.com

Kathleen Elsie "Kay" Dick (29 July 1915 – 19 October 2001) was an English journalist, writer, novelist and autobiographer, who sometimes wrote under the name Edward Lane and Jeremy Scott. She was called "the first woman director in English publishing" and she is celebrated for her dystopian "lost" novel, They.

== Life ==
Dick was born Kathleen Elsie at Queen Charlotte's Hospital, London; her father was never known. She was raised in Switzerland by her mother, Kate Frances Dick, being educated in Geneva, as well as at the Lycée Français in London. Her mother married a man named Paul Erick Dick when her daughter was seven years old and he adopted her and she took his surname.

In early life, Kay Dick worked at Foyle's bookshop in London's Charing Cross Road and, at 26, became the first woman director in English publishing at P.S. King & Son. She later became a journalist, working at the New Statesman. For many years, she edited the literary magazine The Windmill, under the pen name Edward Lane.

Dick wrote five novels between 1949 and 1962, including the famous An Affair of Love (1953) and Solitaire (1958). She also wrote literary biography, researching the lives of Colette and Carlyle. In 1960 she published Pierrot, about the commedia dell'arte.

Dick was a regular reviewer for The Times, The Spectator and Punch, but the work dropped off as she failed to meet deadlines. Dick also edited several anthologies of stories and interviews with writers, including Ivy and Stevie (1971) and Friends and Friendship (1974). She was known for campaigning tirelessly and successfully for the introduction of Public Lending Right, which pays royalties to authors when their books are borrowed from public libraries.

In 1977, Dick published They, a series of dream sequences that won the South-East Arts literature prize, and was described in The Paris Review in 2020 as "a lost dystopian masterpiece". It had remained out of print due to poor sales and Dick experiencing harsh and sexist reviews in the press at the time of the award win. They was re-discovered by chance in an Oxfam charity bookshop in Bath, Somerset, in the summer of 2020 by a literary agent. It was then acquired by Faber and Faber for re-release on 3 February 2022 in the United Kingdom and McNally Editions in the United States.

In 1984, Dick followed the publication of They with an acclaimed autobiographical novel, The Shelf, in which she examined a lesbian affair.

Dick lived for some two decades with the novelist Kathleen Farrell, from 1940 to 1962.

Dick died from lung cancer at a nursing home in Brighton, East Sussex, in 2001, aged 86. She had a somewhat caustic obituary in The Guardian by Michael De-la-Noy, whom she had helped early in his career.

== Legacy ==
Dick's dystopian novel They was "rediscovered" in 2022 and it was celebrated with an event at the British Library as part of LGBT History Month. She was credited as "the first woman director in English publishing".

== Bibliography ==
- By The Lake (1949)
- Young Man (1951)
- An Affair of Love (1953)
- Solitaire (1958)
- Pierrot (1960)
- Sunday (1962)
- Ivy & Stevie (1971), about Ivy Compton-Burnett and Stevie Smith
- Friends & Friendship (1974)
- They (1977)
- The Shelf (1984)
