= Let's Go Play at the Adams' =

1974 novel by Mendal W. Johnson

- First edition cover art
- Author: Mendal W. Johnson
- Language: English
- Genre: Horror
- Published: 1974
- Publisher: Thomas Y. Crowell Co.
- Publication place: United States
- Media type: Print (Hardcover)
- Pages: 282
- ISBN: 0-690-00193-2
- Dewey Decimal: 813/.5/4
- LC Class: PZ4.J7118 PS3560.O3817

Let's Go Play at the Adams' is a 1974 psychological horror novel by Mendal W. Johnson and originally published by Thomas Y. Crowell Co. Its plot focuses on a group of rural Maryland children who drug, incapacitate, and eventually torture the college student babysitter hired by their parents while they are away in Europe for two weeks.

== Publication ==
The novel was originally published in the United States by Thomas Y. Crowell Co. In 2020, Valancourt Books republished it in paperback format under its Paperbacks from Hell series, featuring its original mass-market paperback artwork, and including a new introduction by Grady Hendrix. In 2022, Centipede Press issued a hardback edition, with a limited 500 copies signed by Stefan Dziemianowicz and Dan Rempel, who wrote a new introduction.

== Reception ==
A reviewer for Fort Lauderdale News praised the novel, writing that Johnson "is a master of the art of storytelling and suspense, but this one isn't for the squeamish." Sheryl Friedlander, writing for The Tampa Tribune, compared the novel favorably to The Collector and Lord of the Flies, praising its "style and flow of thought" as "smooth and interesting". It was also compared to A High Wind in Jamaica by William W. Starr, writing for The State. A reviewer for The StarPhoenix described the plot as "savage humanity", saying that they wanted to shower after reading it.

Writing for the St. Louis Post-Dispatch, Clarence E. Olson criticized the book for its extreme violence, saying its themes are "superficial" and that a readers' interest is only maintained through brutality.
