= John Rae (headmaster) =

British educator, author and novelist (1931–2006)

John Rae (20 March 1931 – 16 December 2006) was a British educator, author and novelist. He was headmaster of Taunton School (1966–1970) and then Head Master of Westminster School (1970–1986).

In 1986 he became head of the Laura Ashley Foundation and was on the Board of The Observer newspaper from 1986 to 1993. In 1989 he became executive chairman of the Portman Group.

== Education ==
Rae was educated at Homefield Preparatory School before Bishop Stortford College, an independent school in Bishop's Stortford in Hertfordshire, and Sidney Sussex College, Cambridge.

== Career ==
Rae was Assistant Master at Harrow School between 1955–66 and then headmaster at Taunton School between 1966-70. Rae became Headmaster of Westminster School, an independent school in Central London, in 1970. During his time there he became a prominent and oft-heard voice on educational questions in the British media.

He modernised Westminster and rescued it from its perilous financial position. To do this, he cut staffing and moved the science department from its cramped building to a modern building within easy reach of the school. During his time at the school girls first became full-time members of the school, in 1973. In 1976 a new day house, Dryden's, was created. It is located next to Wren's and under College, just off Little Dean's Yard. In 1981 to cope with the increased number of girls a new boarding house, Purcell's, was opened located about 200m from Little Dean's Yard. In the same year a new building was bought for the Under School – Adrian House in Vincent Square.

Although it has been asserted that he was forced to resign because of negative reactions to his wife Daphne Rae publishing, A World Apart in 1983, detailing their joint experiences during their time at Taunton and Harrow, and raising the issue of gay teachers, he remained at the school until 1986. According to his posthumously published diary, his departure was a combination of exceeding the typical term of headmastership (10 years), his opposition to the Assisted Places Scheme, and a desire to find a new challenge.

== Media appearances ==
During the 1980s, Rae wrote newspaper articles and regularly appeared as a panellist on programmes such as Question Time on BBC 1 and Any Questions on BBC Radio 4, and as an interviewee on Newsnight on BBC 2, in which he often argued for the need for schools to be tolerant and to "apply common sense" when dealing with minor infractions of the rules or end-of-term "high jinks", and that a sense of humour was almost a pre-requisite of "firm but fair" discipline when dealing with teenage pupils, and especially teenage boys. He said that drug-taking was entirely unacceptable, but that pupils should only be expelled if they had committed serious offences, such as supplying and/or selling drugs, or had dishonestly claimed to be innocent when given the chance to 'own up'. He also said that he believed that a co-educational school environment had many merits. He also emphasised that, in his opinion, it was not merely the right of parents to choose to educate their children at independent schools, but also the right of educators not employed by the state to provide education.

== Works ==
Rae was a prolific writer on education, his works including Letters to Parents, The Public School Revolution, and a professional autobiography, Delusions of Grandeur. His 1960 novel, The Custard Boys, shortlisted for the John Llewellyn Rees Memorial Prize, was adapted to make the 1962 film Reach for Glory, which won a United Nations Award, and again for the 1979 film under the novel's original name. In 1983, he assisted Roland Joffe in the production of the film The Killing Fields, and in 1986 he became head of the Laura Ashley Foundation. He was on the board of The Observer newspaper from 1986 to 1993, and in 1989 became executive chairman of the Portman Group, which advocates responsible drinking.

During the 1970s he published a short series of novels for teenagers, borrowing for the purpose the names, and to some extent the characters, of his own children.

His edited diaries were published in 2009 as The Old Boys' Network: A Headmaster's Diaries 1979–1986 (ISBN 978-1-906021-63-4).

The Agnostic's Tale: A Fragment of Autobiography, an investigation into the nature of religious faith was published posthumously in 2013.

== Commemoration ==
John Rae's ashes lie off the cloisters of Westminster Abbey, near a door from Little Dean's Yard used by Westminster boys when they go "Up Abbey".
