= Christine de Rivoyre =

French journalist and writer (1921–2019)

- Born: November 29, 1921; Tarbes
- Died: January 3, 2019 (aged 97)
- Occupations: Journalist and writer
- Known for: Prix Prince Pierre de Monaco
- Notable work: L'Alouette au miroir

Christine Berthe Claude Denis de Rivoyre (29 November 1921 – 3 January 2019) was a French journalist and writer.

== Biography ==
The daughter of Francois Denis de Rivoyre and Madeleine Ballande, she was born in Tarbes. She was educated in Catholic schools and then received a degree in literature from the Sorbonne. She continued her studies at the Syracuse University. De Rivoyre wrote articles for Le Monde and then became literary editor for Marie Claire.

Her first novel L'Alouette au miroir, published in 1955, received the Prix des Quatre Jurys. Several of her novels have been made into films:

- La Mandarine (1957); 1972 film
- Les Sultans (1964); 1968 film
- Le Petit matin (1968); 1971 film - novel received the Prix Interallié

De Rivoyre received the Prix Prince Pierre de Monaco in 1979 and the Grand Prix de Littérature Paul Morand in 1984 from the Académie française for her work.

She was named an Officier in the French Legion of Honour.
