= Allan Wade =

Allan Wade (17 May 1881 – 12 July 1955) was a British actor, theatre director and writer.

== Early life ==
Allan Wade was the son of the Rev Stephen Wade of Boscastle in Cornwall and was educated at Blundell's School in Tiverton. In 1904 be went on the stage as a member of the F. R. Benson company and in 1906 he became secretary, assistant, and play-reader to Granville Barker, with whom he stayed until 1915.

== Later career and writing ==
Although Wade continued to act occasionally for many years, his theatrical interests gradually moved towards direction. He produced 14 plays for the Incorporated Stage Society and almost all the revivals of the Phoenix Society (1919), of which he was one of the four founders. He translated plays by Giraudoux and Cocteau into English.

In his spare time Wade formed extensive collections of the works and fugitive pieces of his favourite living writers – W. B. Yeats, Henry James, Joseph Conrad and Max Beerbohm, hunting out their anonymous contributions to periodicals and copying them out by hand in the British Museum. In 1948 he edited James's then unknown dramatic criticism as The Scenic Art, published by Rupert Hart-Davis in 1950, with an introduction by Leon Edel.

Wade was a friend of Yeats and in 1908 his interim bibliography appeared in Bullen's collected edition of Yeats's works; later he published the standard bibliography. He went on to collect, edit and annotate the Letters of W.B. Yeats (1954) and at the time of his death was far advanced in collecting and editing the letters of Oscar Wilde.

Wade died suddenly on 12 July 1955 aged 74, leaving a widow, Margot, whom he married in 1933.

== Publications ==
Wade's publications included:

- A bibliography of the writings of W. B. Yeats; London: 1951 (3rd edition revised and edited by Russell K. Alspach; 1968; ISBN 0-246-64138-X)
- Memories of the London theatre, 1900-1914; London: Society for Theatre Research, 1983; ISBN 0-85430-037-6 (pbk.)
- The Scenic Art. Notes on acting and the drama 1872 – 1901; 1948; New Brunswick, Rutgers University Press; OCLC Number 24268403
- The letters of W.B. Yeats: 1954; edited by Allan Wade; London: Hart-Davis; Bib ID 2328486

Related publications include:

- W. B. Yeats : a classified bibliography of criticism including additions to Allan Wade's Bibliography of the writings of W. B. Yeats and a section on the Irish literary and dramatic revival; K.P.S. Jochum; Folkestone: Dawson, 1978; ISBN 0-7129-0862-5
- The Quarterly Theatre Review: New Series: Winter 1955, No. 39

== Sources ==
- Lyttelton, George; Rupert Hart-Davis (1978). The Lyttelton Hart-Davis Letters, Volume I. London: John Murray. ISBN 978-0-7195-3478-2.
