= The Winner (1962 film) =

- Directed by: François Reichenbach
- Written by: François Reichenbach
- Produced by: Pierre Braunberger
- Starring: Abdoulaye Faye
- Cinematography: François Reichenbach; Jean-Marc Ripert
- Edited by: Liliane Korb; Kenout Peltier
- Music by: Georges Delerue; Michel Legrand
- Distributed by: Les Films de la Pléiade
- Release date: 1962
- Running time: 105 minutes
- Country: France
- Language: French

The Winner (French: Un cœur gros comme ça) is a 1962 French film directed by François Reichenbach.

== Reception ==
=== Awards ===
- Won: 1961 Louis Delluc Prize
- 1962 Locarno International Film Festival
  - Won: Golden Leopard
