= The Custard Boys =

1960 novel by John Rae

- First edition cover
- Author: John Rae
- Publisher: Rupert Hart-Davis
- Publication date: 1960

The Custard Boys is a 1960 novel by British author John Rae, focusing on the lives of children in a small village in World War II Norfolk dealing with an influx of war refugees. It is sometimes compared to Lord of the Flies, and was adapted to make the film Reach for Glory in 1962 (which was passed with an 'X' certificate at the time by the British Board of Film Censors), and again for a second film carrying the original name in 1979, directed by Colin Finbow.
