= Kathleen Farrell =

British novelist

Kathleen Farrell (4 August 1912 – 25 November 1999) was a British novelist of the post–World War II period who was known for her unsparing and sometimes bitingly funny studies of character.

== Biography ==
Kathleen Farrell was born in London on 4 August 1912. The daughter of a wealthy builder, she was financially independent throughout her life. During World War II, she served as an assistant to Hastings Lees-Smith, the secretary general of the Labour Party. Following the war, she founded a literary agency called Gilbert Wright.

Farrell's first book, Johnny's Not Home from the Fair (1942), was in part a ghost story and its dedication—"For my mother, without her permission"—hinted at autobiographical elements. Following this, she wrote five novels of life in the 1950s: Mistletoe Malice (1951), Take It to Heart (1953), The Cost of Living (1956), The Common Touch (1958), and Limitations of Love (1962). In Limitations of Love the characters Mr Flask & Mrs Walk appear, which is a play on Flask Walk in Hampstead where Farrell lived with Kay Dick. Farrell, who was typically compared to Barbara Pym in contemporary reviews, was known for her sharp depictions of character, frequently verging on the cynical. C. P. Snow praised Mistletoe Malice as a "savagely witty and abnormally penetrating" study of a dysfunctional family collected together at Christmas. The Cost of Living is a darkly humorous portrait of two impoverished women—a freelance typist and an artist—and their attempts to meet people and develop romantic relationships. A passage from this book gives a sense of Farrell's characteristically acerbic tone:

"By that time I had nearly finished the novel. It seemed to get longer and longer towards the end; and sadder, too, and much sillier. There was only one woman in it, and she spent most of her life retching and clinging to park railings; and when she wasn’t doing that she was leaning her forehead against the wall in some dark alleyway. Leaning her forehead against the wall was to stop her being completely overcome by nausea. I can’t remember that it ever did. I wondered how such young men managed to make women feel so sick, so often. And I thought, poor young men, how they suffer."

She was well connected in British literary circles, counting among her friends Ivy Compton-Burnett, Olivia Manning, Pamela Hansford Johnson, and Quentin Crisp, and she was known for encouraging up-and-coming writers. At the same time, it is said that she belonged to an informal group that has been called, quasi-jokingly, "The Lady Novelists' Anti-Elizabeth League," whose members were apparently united in their dislike of the work of novelist Elizabeth Taylor. Other members of the league are said to have included Johnson, Manning, Kate O'Brien, and Kay Dick, who was Farrell's life partner for some twenty years.

== Death and legacy ==
Farrell's novels, though critically well received, did not sell particularly well. She died in Hove, East Sussex, on 25 November 1999.

Farrell's papers are held by the University of Texas, Austin, and include drafts and notes for several unpublished novels and stories.
