= H. E. L. Mellersh =

British writer

Harold Edward Leslie Mellersh (1897–1980) was a British writer, primarily of text books. He was born in Harlesdon, London, and died in Stogumber, Somerset. He was married in Battersea, London in 1921, and had 3 daughters and 1 son.

Mellersh had published about 25 books, including 3 novels in 1926 – 1931, and an autobiography about his experience of World War I. The autobiography, Schoolboy into War is an account of his recruitment at the age of 18, directly from school as an officer in the British Army. He was commissioned into the East Lancashire Regiment in 1915, served on the Western Front, and was wounded three times (once each in 1916, 1917 & 1918). His family then lived in St Alban's, Hertfordshire, where they took in 2 refugees from Belgium, a mother and her young daughter, with the surname of Louwage.

Quote: "I and my like entered the war expecting an heroic adventure and believing implicitly in the rightness of our cause [sounds like Cather's hero Claude]; we ended greatly disillusioned as to the nature of the adventure, but still believing that our cause was right and we had not fought in vain."

A later non-fiction book was about "Fitzroy of the Beagle," because a midshipman aboard Darwin's famous voyage round the world had the same surname of Mellersh (though no direct genealogical connection could be made).

In 1921 Mellersh joined the Inland Revenue as a tax inspector.

== Books ==
Novels

Let Loose (Selwyn and Blount, 1926) Ill Wind (1930) The Salt of the Earth (Chapman and Hall, 1931)

Autobiography
- Schoolboy into War (William Kimber, 1978)

Ebooks

To mark the centenary of Mellersh's joining the army in 1915, three of his books were published as Ebooks in 2015. These are:

- Schoolboy into War: Book 1, The novel (previously published in 1930 as Ill Wind)
- Schoolboy into War: Book 2, The autobiography
- Poet into war: A life of Siegfried Sassoon

The novel has been renamed to make it clear that it tells the same story as the autobiography. The novel is a young man of 30's view, the autobiography that of a man in his seventies.

- H E L Mellersh's World War I books (Njeanius Productions, 2015)

Non fiction

- From Ape Man to Homer: The Story of the Beginnings of Western Civilization (Hale, 1962)
- Charles Darwin: Pioneer of the Theory of Evolution (A. Barker, 1964)
- Minoan Crete (Life in ancient lands) (Evans Brothers, 1967)
- Sumer and Babylon (Thomas Y. Crowell Co., 1965)
- Fitzroy of the Beagle (Mason and Lipscombe, 1968)
- The Destruction of Knossos (The Rise and Fall of Minoan Crete (Mellersh Estate, 1970)
