= James Howard Williams =

British army officer and forester

James Williams
- Born: 15 November 1897; St Just, Cornwall, U.K.
- Died: 30 July 1958 (aged 60); Penzance, Cornwall, U.K.
- Education: Queen's College, Taunton
- Alma mater: Camborne School of Mines
- Occupations: Soldier, Forester and Writer
- Spouse: Susan Margaret Rowland

James Howard Williams, also known as Elephant Bill (15 November 1897 – 30 July 1958), was a British soldier and elephant expert in Burma, known for his work with the Fourteenth Army during the Burma Campaign of World War II, and for his 1950 book Elephant Bill. He was made a Lieutenant-Colonel, mentioned in dispatches three times, and was awarded the OBE in 1945.

== Early life ==
Williams was born at St Just, Cornwall, the son of a Cornish mining engineer who had returned from South Africa and his wife, a Welshwoman. He was educated at Queen's College, Taunton. Like his elder brother he studied at Camborne School of Mines and went on to serve as an officer in the Devonshire Regiment of the British Army in the Middle East during the First World War and in Afghanistan, 1919–20. During this time he served with the Camel Corps and as transport officer in charge of mules. After demobilisation he decided to join the Bombay-Burmah Trading Corporation as a forester working with elephants to extract teak logs.

He served in World War I in the Devonshire Regiment; he was in the Camel Corps, and later Transport Officer in charge of mules. He had read a book by Hawkes, The Diseases of the Camel and the Elephant, and decided he would be interested in a postwar job in Burma. So in 1920 he was in Burma as a Forest Assistant with the Bombay Burmah Trading Corporation which milled teak, and used 2000 elephants. Initially he was at a camp on the banks of the Upper Chindwin River in Upper Burma. He was responsible for seventy elephants and their oozies in ten camps, in an area of about 400 square miles (1,000 km^{2}) in the Myittha Valley, in the Indaung Forest Reserve. The camps were 6 to 7 miles (11 km) apart, with hills of three to four thousand feet high between them. To mill them, one tree was killed by ring-barking the base, then felled after standing for three years, so it had seasoned and was light enough to float. The logs were hauled by elephant to a waterway, then floated down to Rangoon or Mandalay. Elephants were essential to the harvesting of teak, a single healthy elephant could be sold for $150,000 (2000 U.S.), and thousand of elephants were sold this way.

== World War II and after ==
Teak was "as important a munition of war as steel" so timber extraction was an essential industry. Williams was based at Maymyo. When Japan entered the war, it was expected that they would be held in Malaya and Singapore. Despite criticism, the Bombay Burma Corporation arranged evacuation of European women and children, though the government had no such plans. In 1942, elephants were used for evacuation rather than timber extraction from February till the end of April. The retreat from Burma was to Assam via Imphal. The road to Assam went up the Chindwin to Kalewa, then up the Kabaw Valley to Tamu, and across five thousand foot mountains into Manipur and the Imphal Plain. Williams was attached to one evacuation party, which included his wife and children. The Kabaw Valley was nicknamed "The Valley of Death" because of the hundreds of refugees who died there from exhaustion, starvation, cholera, dysentery and smallpox.

Williams was then employed in timber surveys in Bengal and Assam, and raising a labour corps. But in October 1942 he joined the staff of the Eastern Army (later the Fourteenth Army) as Elephant Advisor to the Elephant Company of the Royal Indian Engineers. He was a Burmese speaker with knowledge of Burma, including the Irrawaddy River area and jungle tracks. He was initially posted to 4th Corps Headquarters at Jorhat in Assam. While elephants were used as "sappers" i.e. as part of the Royal Engineers for use in bridge building in places where heavy equipment could otherwise not be brought in, the Royal Indian Army Service Corps wanted them to be regarded simply as a branch of transport, an under-utilization of the real benefit of elephants Williams believed. Many elephants were captured by the Japanese, and some recaptured elephants had to be cured after being attacked by Allied fighters, or from acid burns from wireless batteries carried on their backs in straw-lined boxes.

Williams was known as Sabu, then Elephant Bill. Sir William Slim, commander of the XIVth Army, wrote about elephants in his introduction to the book Elephant Bill: "They built hundreds of bridges for us, they helped to build and launch more ships for us than Helen ever did for Greece. Without them our retreat from Burma would have been even more arduous and our advance to its liberation slower and more difficult."

After World War II he retired to St Buryan, Cornwall, as an author and market gardener. He married Susan Margaret Rowland in 1932 after they met in Burma; they had a son Treve and daughter Lamorna while in Burma. After his death, his wife Susan Williams wrote of her life with him in The Footprints of Elephant Bill.

== Works ==
- Elephant Bill (Rupert Hart-Davis, London, 1950) (account of his experiences with elephants in Burma)
  - also published as: Elephant Bill, Penguin Books, Harmondsworth, 1956
- Bandoola (Rupert Hart-Davis, London, 1953) (Bandoola, named after General Maha Bandoola, was one of the elephants he knew; the content complements that of Elephant Bill)
- The Spotted Deer (Rupert Hart-Davis, London, 1957) (on forestry, in the Andaman Islands)
- Big Charlie (Rupert Hart-Davis, London, 1959) (about elephants)
- In Quest of a Mermaid (Rupert Hart-Davis, London, 1960) (travel in Burma)

Film project

A film Bandoola was planned in 1956 by Hecht-Lancaster and United Artists; it was to have been filmed in Ceylon from November that year with Ernest Borgnine and Sophia Loren in the leading roles.

Bibliography

- Vicki Croke, Elephant Company: The Inspiring Story of an Unlikely Hero and the Animals Who Helped Him Save Lives in World War II (Random House, 2014)
- Susan Williams, The footprints of Elephant Bill (Kimber, 1962)
