= Cinema of Switzerland =

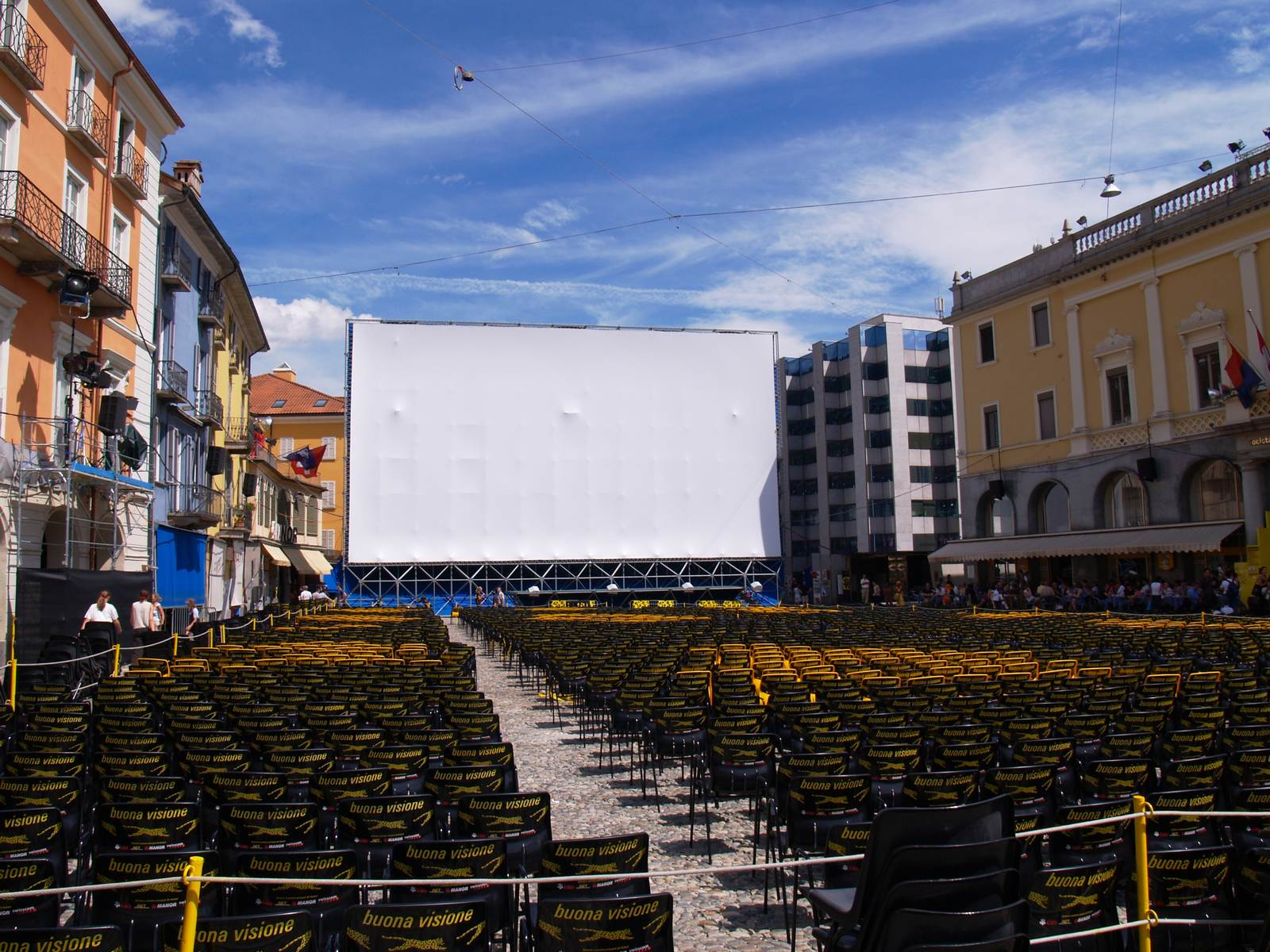
- Piazza Grande in Locarno during the Locarno Film Festival
- No. of screens: 615 (2024)
  - Per capita: 6.8 per 100,000 (2024)
- Main distributors: Warner Bros. Pictures 17.53% Walt Disney Studio (Schweiz) 15.54% Universal Pictures (Schweiz) 12.64% Elite 10.72% Sony Pictures 9.6%

Produced feature films (2024)
- Total: 95 (w/o co-productions)

Number of admissions (2024)
- Total: 10,646,422
  - Per capita: 1.19 (2024)
- National films: 960,709 (9.02%)

Gross box office (2024)
- Total: CHF 171 million

The Cinema of Switzerland encompasses the film industry and cinematography of Switzerland. The film industry based in Switzerland dates to the 1930s and is influenced by the neighboring countries of France, Germany and Italy, with which it shares languages. Before the mid-1960s Swiss films were often sentimental, but the French New Wave led to more experimental cinema. As of 2024, The Swissmakers (1978) is the highest grossing Swiss film of all time.

The Solothurn Film Festival was founded in 1966 with a declaration of showing the modern reality of Swiss Life. It is the most important festival for Swiss film productions. The Locarno Festival founded in 1946 is an annual film festival held every August in Locarno, Switzerland.

== Language and subtitles ==
In German-speaking cantons, French-language films usually have German subtitles. Likewise, in French-speaking cantons, German-language films usually have French subtitles. Adult-oriented films in foreign languages are often screened with original audio and double subtitles in German and French. Children-oriented films in foreign languages are usually dubbed.

The habit of subtitling rather than dubbing films persists in German-speaking areas into the 21st century, partly because dialect does not lend itself well to intertitles and is better suited to spoken cinema.

== History ==
=== Early cinema and silent film era ===
Cinema first appeared in Switzerland at the 1896 Geneva National Exhibition, where French pioneers Auguste and Louis Lumière's projectionists presented the cinematograph using an invention patented the previous year. Some films came from Paris, while others were shot, developed and edited on site. Soon, projections multiplied in fairs, music halls and circuses.

Only a few films produced before World War I have been preserved. The Swiss Film Archive (Cinémathèque suisse) in Lausanne, co-founded by Freddy Buache, began systematically archiving films of all genres in 1948.

In the early years of the 20th century, traveling cinema gave way to permanent venues which contributed to the subsequent development of specialized distribution and financing. During the silent film era, which lasted until the late 1920s, domestic production remained embryonic with few attempts at making Swiss films. Swiss Americans made a film about the Birth of the Confederation in the Alps in 1924. The Swiss mountains and lakes would serve as backdrops for filmmakers from around the world for decades to come.

Most Swiss films made before 1930 are rarities or curiosities, lacking significant artistic substance and having limited distribution. However, it was during this period that the foundations of the current distribution system were laid, based essentially on importing films produced in neighboring countries and the United States. In the 1930s, the desire for autonomous production emerged, but with little effect. Public and private financiers believed that, given the narrowness and linguistic diversity of the domestic market, film production would hardly be profitable.

=== Classical Swiss cinema: 1930s-1950s ===
The birth of Swiss production coincided with the beginnings of sound film. Swiss German dialect cinema had a dominant role from the start, which it maintained, with interruptions, until the 1990s. The comedy Wie d'Warret würkt ("The Effects of Truth", 1933) can be considered the first Swiss film. Dialect film was for a long time the only specific genre of Swiss cinema, strengthening the identity of the country's German-speaking majority and taking on particular cultural importance during the era of the Third Reich, when increased use of dialect manifested the need to distinguish Switzerland from Germany (Geistige Landesverteidigung).

During World War II, domestic film production experienced a brief boom due to exceptional circumstances that forced the state to take protective measures against film imports. From the 1939 mobilization, censorship was introduced to exclude Axis cinematographic propaganda, but sometimes also served to ban Swiss films like De achti Schwyzer by Oskar Wälterlin.

Cinematographic works of real artistic value and others that indulged in commissioned historical heroism emerged during the war and post-war periods, including La nuit sans permission and Gilberte de Courgenay by Franz Schnyder, Romeo und Julia auf dem Dorfe by Hans Trommer and Valérian Schmidely, Wachtmeister Studer and Landamman Stauffacher by Leopold Lindtberg.

The 1950s marked the peak of dialect cinema, which enjoyed great popularity with the petit-bourgeois dramas of Kurt Früh (Oberstadtgass, Bäckerei Zürrer) and the rural subjects of Franz Schnyder (Uli the Farm Servant and Uli the Farmer, both based on works by Jeremias Gotthelf). Schnyder's idyllic Emmental became a commonplace of indigenous cinema, as did the old town and working-class neighborhoods of Früh's picturesque Zurich.

The Praesens Film company, founded in Zurich in 1924 by Polish immigrant Lazar Wechsler, faced little competition in Swiss fiction film production before the early 1960s. The post-war period brought thematic openness, and Praesens, seeking to establish itself in international markets, achieved worldwide success with The Last Chance (1945) by Leopold Lindtberg, which dealt with the refugee drama.

=== New Swiss cinema: 1960s-1980s ===
Under the influence of models from France and England, Swiss cinema renewed itself along two main axes. Fiction film prospered in French-speaking Switzerland and documentary developed in German-speaking Switzerland as a specific indigenous production. Television, which played a co-producer role, was undeniably the origin of these two orientations.

While before 1960 French-speaking Switzerland had hardly produced films of any originality (except for Max Haufler's Farinet ou l'or dans la montagne, based on Charles Ferdinand Ramuz, 1938), French-speaking directors suddenly placed themselves at the forefront of Swiss cinema. Their works enthused audiences in France and other European countries, as well as in German-speaking Switzerland, through the 1980s. Alain Tanner (The Salamander, Jonah Who Will Be 25 in the Year 2000), Michel Soutter (The Surveyors) and Claude Goretta (The Invitation, The Lacemaker) gained international renown, making Geneva another commonplace of Swiss cinema, though adopting a more critical attitude than Kurt Früh and Franz Schnyder.

The Group 5, emerging from French-speaking Swiss television and composed of Alain Tanner, Claude Goretta, Jean-Louis Roy, Michel Soutter and Jean-Jacques Lagrange, produced numerous low-budget feature films ("buddy cinema") that established the reputation of new Swiss cinema.

In German-speaking Switzerland, renewal in the 1960s and 1970s proceeded more slowly. In documentary and experimental film, however, an autonomous style developed, marked by rigorous thinking and ethical concerns. German-speaking Swiss documentary cinema established itself beyond national borders at least since Die letzten Heimposamenter by Yves Yersin (1974). Works such as Ursula oder das unwerte Leben by Walter Marti and Reni Mertens, Siamo Italiani by Alexander J. Seiler, Pazifik oder die Zufriedenen by Fredi M. Murer, and Bananera Libertad by Peter von Gunten achieved great success.

A movement appeared in German-speaking Switzerland aimed at presenting socially critical documentaries, with directors who were also producers, scriptwriters, and sometimes cameramen and editors, including Richard Dindo, Kurt Gloor, Peter von Gunten, Walter Marti and Reni Mertens, Fredi M. Murer, Hans-Ulrich Schlumpf, and Alexander J. Seiler.

Dialect film, which had become less popular after the 1960 crisis and under the effect of early signs of new Swiss cinema, experienced a period of rapid change after 1975. Major German-speaking fiction film directors included Kurt Gloor (The Sudden Loneliness of Konrad Steiner), Rolf Lyssy (The Swissmakers), Markus Imhoof (The Boat Is Full), Fredi M. Murer (Gray Zone, Alpine Fire), Xavier Koller (Journey of Hope) and Daniel Schmid (Shadow of Angels, Tosca's Kiss). Jean-Luc Godard, who lives and works in French-speaking Switzerland, represents a special case. This untypical filmmaker has made the popular films Breathless, Pierrot le Fou, Every Man for Himself and Hélas pour moi.

In Italian-speaking Switzerland, cinema struggled to develop due to difficult production conditions specific to the Swiss sector, aggravated by belonging to a linguistic minority. During the 1970s, Ticino cinema found its place among Swiss productions, particularly through its ability to address subjects related to borders (Storia di confine, 1971, by Bruno Soldini), immigration, deviance (24 sur 24, 1972, and Cerchiamo per subito operai, offriamo…, 1974, by Villi Hermann) and linguistic identity (E noialtri apprendisti, 1976, by Giovanni Doffini).

=== Federal film support and international recognition ===
Between the early 1970s and mid-1980s, Swiss production as a whole benefited from an exceptional combination of resources and talents, earning lasting international recognition. Local interest was combined with a cosmopolitan atmosphere. This "Swiss miracle," consisting of short and medium-term successes, can be largely attributed to federal film aid that was gradually implemented from 1962.

The Cinema Act regulated the composition and tasks of the Federal Film Commission, support measures, as well as film distribution and export. Alongside selective aid and, since 1997, aid linked to public success, the Federal Office of Culture awards study and quality grants. A Swiss Film Prize has been awarded annually since 1998. State aid makes it possible to mobilize and channel resources from cantons, municipalities, private circles and television. Paradoxically, the film that achieved the greatest commercial success, with 1 million admissions in Switzerland - The Swissmakers (1978) - was produced without federal support. As of 2014, The Swissmakers remains the highest grossing Swiss film of all time.

=== Contemporary developments ===
In the last fifteen years of the 20th century, twenty feature-length documentaries and fiction films were produced annually, though occupying a small share of the market. Documentary films such as De mieux en mieux by Alfredo Knuchel, Well Done by Thomas Imbach, and Eine Synagoge zwischen Tal und Hügel by Franz Rickenbach demonstrate that the inspiration of Swiss cinema pioneers remains alive at the turn of the century.

Swiss producers achieved much greater success in commissioned films, not exposed to permanent competition from a superpower. Notable companies included Condor Film AG, founded in Zurich in 1947 by Heinrich Fueter, then Kern Film AG (Basel), Julius Pinschewer Film Atelier, Paul Schmid Filmproduktion and Charles Zbinden (all in Bern), Actua Films (Geneva), Charles-Georges Duvanel (Lausanne and Geneva), and others that regularly produced documentaries, art films, advertising films or short subjects.

Since the advent of video in the early 1980s, film production has diversified. Given the narrowness of the Swiss market, there has been increasing recourse since the 1990s to co-productions with foreign partners, as practiced by Fama Film (Bern) and Vega Film (Zurich), with some shoots taking place entirely abroad.

=== Movie theaters ===
The first permanent cinemas succeeded traveling attractions around 1900-1910, initially in cities, replacing projections in fair booths, café back rooms, or shop annexes by traveling projectionists. From 1910 onwards, the first cinema "palaces" or "cathedrals" appeared, luxuriously appointed venues like the Orient in Zurich (Jakob Haller and Karl Schindler, 1913), whose careful decoration signaled the respectability that the new medium was acquiring.

During the silent film era until the late 1920s, cinemas opened in all regions and distribution became professionalized. The separation between exploitation and distribution remains in effect today, with few exceptions. The increase in the number of theaters before 1930 was a warning sign of growth linked to the arrival of sound film (1928), the beginning of the "classical" era.

Notable cinema architecture includes the very sober Roxy Cinema in Zurich (Carl Hubacher, Rudolf Steiger and Max Bill, 1932), featuring a sliding roof that served as air conditioning in summer. The Studio 4 in Zurich (Werner Frey and Roman Clemens, 1949) and the Cinévox in Neuhausen am Rheinfall (Max Bill, 1957) were both built in the spirit of the Bauhaus, emphasizing formal unity of all their elements.

In 1963, the number of cinemas reached its peak in Switzerland: 105 in the canton of Bern (compared to 47 in 1931 and 64 in 1992), 86 in Zurich (compared to 35 and 63), 67 in Vaud (compared to 30 and 46), and 42 in Ticino (compared to 21 and 23).

The years after 1990 are characterized by a quasi-cartel situation and a growing tendency to invest in the renovation and construction of cinemas, particularly in the form of multiplex cinemas located in suburbs. The first was the Cinémax in Zurich (1993). The first IMAX theater opened at the Swiss Museum of Transport in Lucerne in 1996.

== Film festivals ==
Switzerland hosts several significant film festivals. The Locarno Festival, founded in 1946, is an annual film festival held every August in Locarno. During World War II, various film festivals were organized in Switzerland (Basel, Lausanne, Lugano, etc.) on the model of the Venice International Film Festival, interrupted from 1943 to 1946. In 1946, the Lugano event moved to Locarno and became Switzerland's main festival.

Since the 1960s, the Locarno International Film Festival has given significant space to emerging cinematographies and beginning filmmakers. In crisis at the end of the decade, it experienced recovery from 1970, then worldwide success from 1980, under successive directors David Streiff (1982-1991), Marco Müller (1992-2000) succeeded by Irene Bignardi (2001).

The Solothurn Film Festival was founded in 1966 with a declaration of showing the modern reality of Swiss life. It is the most important festival for Swiss film productions and is dedicated to national production. Originally, all recent Swiss films could be shown there, but selection became necessary and was officially introduced in 1980.

The Amateur Film Festival created in Rolle in 1963 moved to Nyon in 1965, where it became the International Documentary Cinema Festival in 1985. After turbulent years, its specialization in non-fiction earned it a wide audience. In 1995, the mention "Visions du réel" was added to its name and it opened to video in 1997.

An International Alpine Film Festival has existed since 1969 at Les Diablerets. Other festivals have been created in Switzerland since 1980, with the most interesting specializing in specific categories of films: Third World production (Festival de films, created in 1980, in Fribourg since 1986); comedy (Vevey Festival, which has led a difficult existence since its origins in 1981); experimental film and new media (VIPER Festival, created in 1980, in Lucerne from 1981, in Basel from 2000).

== Notable personalities ==
=== Directors ===
- Richard Dembo
- Tim Fehlbaum
- Marcel Gisler
- Jean-Luc Godard
- Claude Goretta
- Xavier Koller
- Markus Imhoof
- Leopold Lindtberg
- Fredi Murer
- Dominique Othenin-Girard
- Daniel Schmid
- Franz Schnyder
- Alain Tanner
- Yves Yersin
- Stefano Knuchel
- Claude Barras

=== Actors ===
- Ursula Andress
- Anne-Marie Blanc
- Sibylle Blanc
- Zarli Carigiet
- Eliane Chappuis
- Bruno Ganz
- Heinrich Gretler
- Emil Hegetschweiler
- Max Haufler
- Marthe Keller
- Maximilian Schell
- Ella Rumpf
- Mathias Gnädinger
- Roeland Wiesnekker

== Sources ==
This article incorporates text from a free content work. Licensed under CC-BY SA. Text taken from Cinéma, Pierre Lachat, Historical Dictionary of Switzerland. Translated by Walter Weideli.

This article incorporates text from a free content work. Licensed under CC-BY SA. Text taken from Salles de cinéma, Pierre Lachat, Historical Dictionary of Switzerland.

This article incorporates text from a free content work. Licensed under CC-BY SA. Text taken from Production de film, Felix Aeppli, Historical Dictionary of Switzerland. Translated by Marie Ellenberger-Leuba.

This article incorporates text from a free content work. Licensed under CC-BY SA. Text taken from Festivals de cinéma, HLS DHS DSS, Historical Dictionary of Switzerland.

== Bibliography ==
- (in French) Olivier Moeschler, Cinéma suisse. Une politique culturelle en action : l'État, les professionnels, les publics, Presses polytechniques et universitaires romandes, collection "Le savoir suisse", 2011.

== See also ==
- List of cinema of the world
- Freddy Buache
- List of Swiss films
- World cinema
- Swiss Film Archive
