= Marie-Louise (film) =

- French film poster
- Directed by: Leopold Lindtberg; Franz Schnyder
- Written by: Richard Schweizer
- Produced by: Oscar Düby; Lazar Wechsler
- Starring: Josiane Hegg; Heinrich Gretler; Margrit Winter; Anne-Marie Blanc; Armin Schweizer
- Cinematography: Emil Berna
- Edited by: Hermann Haller
- Music by: Robert Blum
- Production company: Praesens-Film
- Distributed by: Praesens-Film (Switzerland); Arthur Mayer & Joseph Burstyn (USA)
- Release dates: 19 February 1944 (Zürich); 12 November 1945 (USA)
- Running time: 102 minutes (Switzerland)
- Country: Switzerland
- Languages: Swiss German; French

Marie-Louise is a 1944 Swiss drama film directed by Leopold Lindtberg and Franz Schnyder and written by Richard Schweizer. Set during the Second World War, it follows a 12-year-old French girl sent to Switzerland to recover from the effects of wartime bombing. In 1946, Schweizer won the Academy Award for Best Original Screenplay for the film, and Marie-Louise became the first non-English-language film to receive an Oscar.

== Synopsis ==
In 1941, a 12-year-old French girl from occupied France is sent to Switzerland to recover from the effects of wartime bombing. When no foster family is found for her, a social worker takes her into her father's home. Over time, the girl and the initially gruff old man develop a close bond. After three months in Switzerland, however, she must return to France.

== Cast ==
The cast includes:

- Josiane Hegg as Marie-Louise Fleury
- Heinrich Gretler as Direktor Rüegg / Director Rüegg
- Anne-Marie Blanc as Heidi Rüegg
- Margrit Winter as Anna Rüegg
- Armin Schweizer as Lehrer Bänninger / Teacher Bänninger
- Mathilde Danegger as Päuli
- Fred Tanner as Robert Scheibli
- Emil Gerber as Ernst Schwarzenbach
- Bernard Ammon as André
- Pauline Carton as Frau Gilles / Mrs. Gilles
- Germaine Tournier as Frau Fleury / Mrs. Fleury
- Jean Hort as Vater Deschamps

== Release and reception ==
Marie-Louise premiered on 19 February 1944 at the Apollo cinema in Zurich. Critics received the film very positively. Reviews praised its honesty, credibility, and spirit of helpfulness. The film ran for 16 weeks in Zurich and drew about one million cinema admissions nationwide.

In 1946, Richard Schweizer won the Academy Award for Best Original Screenplay for the film. Marie-Louise was the first non-English-language film to receive an Oscar.

== Restoration ==
The film was digitally restored by Swiss Radio and Television (SRF), with support from the Cinémathèque suisse, Praesens-Film, and the Memoriav foundation. The restoration was based on a photochemically prepared version from 2013, which had to be checked against parts of other versions. Three different prints were used because the Cinémathèque copy still contained damaged material that could not be replaced. The film was then reconstructed frame by frame to match the original version. The work also involved image retouching and the correction of copying errors in the negative.

The restored version was screened at the Zurich Film Festival in 2015.
