= The Village (1953 film) =

1953 film

- Film poster
- Directed by: Leopold Lindtberg
- Written by: David Wechsler; Kurt Früh; Peter Viertel; Elisabeth Montagu; Leopold Lindtberg
- Produced by: Lazar Wechsler
- Starring: John Justin; Eva Dahlbeck; Sigfrit Steiner; Krystyna Bragiel; Voytek Dolinski
- Cinematography: Emil Berna
- Edited by: Gordon Hales
- Release date: 1953
- Running time: 98 minutes
- Countries: Switzerland; United Kingdom
- Languages: English; Swiss-German

The Village (German: Sie fanden eine Heimat) is a 1953 Swiss-British drama film directed by Leopold Lindtberg. Set in the Pestalozzi village in Trogen after the Second World War, it follows war orphans from across Europe. The film won the Bronze Berlin Bear at the 3rd Berlin International Film Festival and was screened in competition at the 1953 Cannes Film Festival.

== Synopsis ==
The Village is set in the Pestalozzi village in Trogen after the Second World War, where war orphans from across Europe live under adult care. Part of the story centres on Anja and Andrzej, two children affected when the Polish authorities demand the return of the Polish children. As they try to hide from removal, Andrzej is overwhelmed by wartime memories during a local festival and dies in a fall.

== Cast ==
The cast includes:

- John Justin as Alan Manning
- Eva Dahlbeck as Wanda Piwonska
- Sigfrit Steiner as Heinrich Meili
- Krystyna Bragiel as Anja
- Voytek Dolinski as Andrzej

== Production ==
Praesens-Film began planning a film about the Pestalozzi village in Trogen around the time of the village’s founding in 1946. Leopold Lindtberg eventually directed the project after other directors had been considered, and had originally planned a documentary about the village. The story for the feature film was written by Kurt Früh and David Wechsler. Although the plot was fictional, it drew on the real Pestalozzi village and on documented postwar disputes over the repatriation of child refugees.

== Reception ==
At the 3rd Berlin International Film Festival, The Village won the Bronze Berlin Bear. It was also screened in competition at the 1953 Cannes Film Festival.

== Festival screenings ==
After premiering in 1953, the film was later screened at the Cannes Film Festival and the Lumière Film Festival in 2023, and at the Solothurner Filmtage in 2024.
