= Zarli Carigiet =

Swiss actor and comedian

Zarli Carigiet (5 August 1907 – 6 May 1981) was a Swiss actor and comedian. He was a member of the satirical Cabaret Cornichon and starred in movies by directors such as Leopold Lindtberg, Franz Schnyder, and Kurt Früh. He was the younger brother of the artist and illustrator Alois Carigiet.

== Biography ==
Balthasar Anton Carigiet was one of eleven children born to Alois Carigiet and Barbara Antonia Carigiet, née Lombriser. His father was a farmer in Trun in the canton of Grisons, and had served as magistrate in the district of Disentis. Economic hardship forced the family to resettle in the canton's capital Chur in 1911, where Zarli visited the primary and secondary school, and absolved an apprenticeship with decorative artist Walter Räth. Zarli's older brother Alois had also been trained in Räth's atelier. In the late 1920s and early 1930s, Zarli worked as a graphic designer for his brother's atelier in Zurich. Carigiet's comical talent was discovered by Walter Lesch, a comedy writer and the artistic director of the satirical "Cabaret Cornichon" ("Gherkin Cabaret"). Carigiet joined the Cornichon 's ensemble in 1934 and remained a steady member until 1951.

Carigiet often played the part of a likeable social outcast, such as a former convict on parole in Leopold Lindtberg's cinematic adaptation of Friedrich Glauser's detective story Wachtmeister Studer (Constable Studer, 1939), a poet and psychiatric patient in Matto regiert (Madness Rules, 1947) by the same director and author, or a homeless person in Kurt Früh's Hinter den sieben Gleisen ("Behind the Seven Tracks", 1959) He also performed in blackface: as an "Abyssinian" in a political Cornichon sketch on Ethiopia in 1935, or as "Hassan the Moor" in Lindtberg's film adaptation of Conrad Ferdinand Meyer's Der Schuss von der Kanzel ("The Shot from the Pulpit" 1942).

Zarli Carigiet died in Männedorf on 6 May 1981.

== Selected filmography ==
- Fusilier Wipf (1938)
- Constable Studer (1939)
- Madness Rules (1947)
- Palace Hotel (1952)
- Der Teufel hat gut lachen (1960)
- Snow White and the Seven Jugglers (1962)
