= Hinter den sieben Gleisen =

- Directed by: Kurt Früh
- Written by: Kurt Früh; Hans Hausmann
- Produced by: Max Dora; Lazar Wechsler; Kurt Früh
- Starring: Max Haufler; Ursula Heyer
- Cinematography: Emil Berna
- Edited by: Hans Heinrich Egger
- Music by: Walter Baumgartner
- Production company: Gloriafilm AG
- Release date: December 11, 1959
- Running time: 102 minutes
- Country: Switzerland
- Language: Swiss German

Hinter den sieben Gleisen is a 1959 Swiss comedy film written and directed by Kurt Früh. Set in Zürich, it follows a pregnant German maid who finds refuge with three tramps after stepping in front of a locomotive in a rail yard. Früh later regarded it as his favourite film.

== Synopsis ==
After stepping in front of a locomotive in a rail yard, a pregnant German maid named Inge finds refuge in a nearby shed with three tramps. Although they are reluctant at first, they soon begin to care for her and her newborn child.

== Cast ==
The cast includes:

- Max Haufler as Barbarossa / Karl Kessler
- Ruedi Walter as Clown
- Zarli Carigiet as Dürst
- Ursula Heyer as Inge
- Hannes Schmidhauser as Hartmann
- Margrit Rainer as Frau Herzog
- Helmut Förnbacher as Paul Eberhard
- Ettore Cella as Colonna
- Fred Tanner as Polizist Meier 12
- Albert Pulmann as Caraco

== Background ==
Kurt Früh regarded Hinter den sieben Gleisen as his favourite film. The characters Barbarossa, Dürst and Clown had previously appeared as supporting characters in Früh’s 1957 film Bäckerei Zürrer. An early working title for Hinter den sieben Gleisen was Die unheiligen drei Könige. Früh returned to the three tramps in his 1960 musical comedy Der Teufel hat gut lachen.

== Production ==
The film was produced by Gloriafilm AG in Zürich. Its producers were Max Dora, Lazar Wechsler and Kurt Früh. Filming took place from 24 August to October 1959. Interior scenes were shot at the Gesellenhaus Wolfbach in Zürich and at the Rosenhof film studio, while exterior scenes were filmed in Zürich and its surroundings, including the rail yard and the Zürichberg.

== Music ==
The film’s music was composed by Walter Baumgartner. Its title song, “Hinter den sieben Gleisen”, was sung by César Keiser, with lyrics by Fridolin Tschudi and Kurt Früh. The film also used electronic sound effects by Oscar Sala on the Mixturtrautonium.

== Release and reception ==
The film premiered on 11 December 1959 at the Rex cinema in Zürich. In 2015, SRF 1 broadcast a restored version of the film as part of a season marking the 100th anniversary of Kurt Früh’s birth. In 2018, the film was screened at Film: Schweiz, the first Swiss film festival in Berlin, where it was presented as one of the classics in a programme spanning films made between 1959 and 2016. In a retrospective review, Filmdienst described the film as entertainment directed with a sense of humour and said that it derives much of its appeal from its ensemble cast.
