= The Last Chance (1945 film) =

1945 film

- German: Die letzte Chance
- Directed by: Leopold Lindtberg
- Written by: Alberto Barberis; Elizabeth Montagu; Richard Schweizer
- Produced by: Lazar Wechsler
- Starring: Ewart G. Morrison
- Cinematography: Emil Berna; Franz Vlasak
- Edited by: Hermann Haller; René Martinet
- Distributed by: Metro-Goldwyn-Mayer
- Release date: 26 May 1945
- Running time: 104 minutes
- Country: Switzerland
- Languages: German; Italian; English; Swiss German; French; Yiddish; Dutch; Polish
- Box office: 3,068,298 admissions (France)

The Last Chance (German: Die letzte Chance) is a 1945 Swiss war film directed by Leopold Lindtberg. It was entered into the 1946 Cannes Film Festival and won the Grand Prize of the Festival (the Golden Palm). The film was selected for screening as part of the Cannes Classics section at the 2016 Cannes Film Festival.

== Plot ==
When the Allies land in southern Italy in 1943, Allied prisoners of war held there are evacuated north by their captors. Some prisoners escape when a train is bombed at night, and Englishman Lieutenant Halliday and American Sergeant Braddock team up. A civilian hides them in a cart carrying sacks of wheat past an Italian security check, and they break off into the countryside. They search for a boat to cross a river, and a pretty young woman tells them an armistice has been signed. They enter a town which is strangely quiet, just before the Germans arrive to take over. The woman's uncle gives the two men civilian clothes and recommends they sneak aboard a freight train. At one stop, they watch helplessly as a woman named Frau Wittels is separated from her husband by the Germans.

They leave the train to head into the mountains where they encounter partisans who let them cross a bridge, warning them not to endanger the people in the town. They encounter a friendly priest in the church who introduces Halliday to Giuseppe, who can guide them with some refugees through the mountains. Among them are a Polish tailor and his niece, a factory worker from Belgrade, a professor more concerned about his papers than his own life, Frenchwoman Madame Monnier, Frau Wittels and her son Bernard. British Major Telford, also hidden in the church, persuades Halliday and Braddock to join the partisans.

A radio broadcast announces that Il Duce, the deposed Italian fascist leader, has been freed by the Germans and a disgruntled former fascist leaves to betray the refugees. That night, shooting is heard coming from the bridge. The priest tells the group to hide in the woods, leaving the children and old people in his charge, and persuades the three soldiers to lead the refugees to Giuseppe. The fascist informant reluctantly tells the priest that he has to take him to the Germans.

The refugees reach Giuseppe's village to find the Germans have gotten there first and killed Giuseppe and all other men of the village. The major reluctantly agrees to take the new orphans with them into the mountains. The aged tailor cannot keep up in the snowstorm, but the others find shelter in a mountain rescue hut. When the storm ends, a German patrol appears with orders to close the frontier. They bypass the hut but block the pass. Halliday proposes he create a diversion with the five bullets left in the major's pistol, but Telford refuses. Instead, the entire party set out at night, hoping to escape detection, and elude a ski patrol when Bernard draws the Germans away, at the cost of his life. The others make it into Switzerland, though Halliday is shot. A Swiss officer informs them only children, people over 65 and political refugees can remain but gets authority from the government to let everyone stay. In the final scene, they attend Halliday's funeral.

== Cast ==
As listed in opening credits:

- Ewart G. Morrison as Major Telford
- John Hoy as Lieutenant John Halliday
- Ray Reagan as Sergeant Jim Braddock
- Luisa Rossi as Tonina
- Odeardo Mosini as An Innkeeper
- Giuseppe Galeati as A Carrier
- Romano Calò as Priest
- Leopold Biberti as A Swiss lieutenant
- Therese Giehse as Frau Wittels
- Robert Schwarz as Bernard, her son

Other:

- Tino Erler as Muzio
- Sigfrit Steiner as Military Doctor
- Emil Gerber as Frontier Guard
- Germaine Tournier as Mme. Monnier
- M. Sakhnowsky as Hillel Sokolowski
- Berthe Sakhnowsky as Chanele
- Rudolf Kamft as Professor
- Jean Martin as Dutchman
- Gertrudten Cate as Dutchwoman
- Carlo Romatko as Yugoslav Worker

== Production ==
Produced in Switzerland in 1944, the two British leads had been prisoners of war who escaped from Italy into Switzerland with the one American lead being an Army Air Forces crewman whose plane landed in Switzerland and had been interned. All three were chosen for the film by the director.

== Reception ==
Bosley Crowther, film critic of The New York Times, praised The Last Chance, describing it as "a vivid and honest film" and "a tense, exciting drama based substantially on documented facts."
