= Sigfrit Steiner =

Swiss actor (1906–1988)

Sigfrit Steiner (31 October 1906 – 21 March 1988) was a Swiss actor. His first stage performance was in 1928 in Gera. He performed in more than one hundred films. He was married to journalist and author Anne Rose Katz.

== Selected filmography ==
- Fusilier Wipf (1938) - Oberleutnant
- Constable Studer (1939) - Untersuchungsricher Steffen
- Dilemma (1940) - Prosecutor
- Das Menschlein Matthias (1941) - Gemperle
- Bieder der Flieger (1941) - Schwarzhausen
- Steinbruch (1942) - Näppi - Dorfidiot
- Menschen, die vorüberziehen (1943) - Gendarme
- The Last Chance (1945) - Military Doctor
- Madness Rules (1947) - Kommissar
- Nach dem Sturm (1948)
- Land der Sehnsucht (1950)
- Palace Hotel (1952) - Gloor
- The Village (1953) - Heinrich Meile
- On Trial (1954) - Geôlier (uncredited)
- Uli the Tenant (1955) - Gegenanwalt
- Polizischt Wäckerli (1956) - Arzt
- Kitty and the Great Big World (1956) - Polizeibeamter
- Oberstadtgass (1956) - Polizist
- Taxichauffeur Bänz (1957) - Tonis Chef
- Bäckerei Zürrer (1957) - Tramp with Cigar Starting Music in Opening Scene (uncredited)
- It Happened in Broad Daylight (1958) - Det. Feller
- Der Schinderhannes (1958) - Baron Achbach
- Your Body Belongs to Me (1959)
- Der Teufel hat gut lachen (1960)
- Schneewittchen und die sieben Gaukler (1962) - Inhaber Sutor Heizungen (uncredited)
- Anne Bäbi Jowäger - II. Teil: Jakobli und Meyeli (1962) - Gerichtspräsident
- Stop Train 349 (1963)
- A Man in His Prime (1964) - Kriminalinspektor Scherbl
- The Trap Snaps Shut at Midnight (1966) - Dr. Smeat
- Der Fall (1972) - Polizeichef
- Cry of the Black Wolves (1972)
- The Pedestrian (1973) - Auditor
- Fluchtgefahr (1974) - Hausbursche Stotz
- The Sudden Loneliness of Konrad Steiner (1976) - Konrad Steiner
- Die Magd (1976) - Bryner
- Waldrausch (1977) - Waldrauscher
- Heinrich (1977) - Diener Riebisch
- Brass Target (1978) - Herr Schroeder
- When Hitler Stole Pink Rabbit (1978) - Onkel Julius
- Bread and Stones (1979) - Tierarzt
- Das gefrorene Herz (1980) - Korber
- Der Mond ist nur a nackerte Kugel (1981) - Moserbauer
- Imperative (1982) - Professor
- Wagner (1983, TV Series) - King Ludwig I of Bavaria
- A Love in Germany (1983) - Melchior
- Embers (1983) - Obert Wettach
- Die schwarze Spinne (1983) - Hornbachbauer
- Lisa und die Riesen (1984)
- Fatherland (1986) - Drittemann
- Duet for One (1986) - Leonid Lefimov
- Wenn ich die Antwort wüßte (1987)
- La nuit de l'eclusier (1989) - Father of Charles Belloz (final film role)
