= Snow White and the Seven Jugglers =

1962 film

- Directed by: Kurt Hoffmann
- Written by: Günter Neumann
- Produced by: Heinz Angermeyer; Georg Richter; Lazar Wechsler
- Starring: Caterina Valente; Walter Giller; Georg Thomalla
- Cinematography: Sven Nykvist
- Edited by: Hermann Haller
- Music by: Heino Gaze
- Production companies: Independent Film; Praesens-Film
- Distributed by: Constantin Film
- Release date: 14 December 1962
- Running time: 116 minutes
- Countries: Switzerland; West Germany
- Language: German

Snow White and the Seven Jugglers (German: Schneewittchen und die sieben Gaukler) is a 1962 Swiss-West German musical comedy film directed by Kurt Hoffmann and starring Caterina Valente, Walter Giller and Georg Thomalla.

It was shot at the Bavaria Studios in Munich. The film's sets were designed by the art directors Hertha Hareiter and Otto Pischinger.

== Cast ==
- Caterina Valente as Dr. Anita Rossi
- Walter Giller as Norbert Lang, Hotelier
- Hanne Wieder as Ines del Mar
- Georg Thomalla as Clown Lukas
- Rudolf Rhomberg as Artist Simson
- Ernst Waldow as Subdirektor Säuberlich
- Günther Schramm as Schulreiter Marcel
- Helmut Brasch as Dompteur Toni
- Otto Storr as Wenzel Clown
- Gaston Palmer as Roderich Clown
- Aladar Hudi as Vitali Messerwerfer
- Peter W. Staub as Burghalter, Friseur
- Zarli Carigiet as Staufinger Holzhändler
- Horst Tappert as Hugendobler, Künstleragent
- Inigo Gallo as Diener Pedro
- Henry Vahl as Mr. Peterson, Hotelgast
- Klaus Havenstein as Kämpfi Agent
- Albert Pulmann as Flädli
- Selma Urfer as Miss Peabody
- Doris Kiesow as Frau Wuppertal
- Paul Birgs as Herr Wuppertal
- Ellinor Richter as Madame Tercier
- Osman Ragheb as Abdullah
- Rezci Alemzadeh as Mingo
- Erich Sehnke as Alberto
- Henry van Lyck as Koch
- Kurt Bülau as Koch
- Hannes Ganz as Koch
- Edgar Wenzel as Kellner Alfonso
- Klaus Delonge as Kellner
- Erhard Meissner as Kellner
- Richard Rüdiger as Kellner
- Karl Wagner as Geschäftsführer im Warenhaus

== Bibliography ==
- Bock, Hans-Michael & Bergfelder, Tim. The Concise CineGraph. Encyclopedia of German Cinema. Berghahn Books, 2009.
