= Heidi (1952 film) =

- Directed by: Luigi Comencini
- Written by: Richard Schweizer; William Michael Treichlinger; Max Weinberg
- Based on: Heidi; 1880 novel by Johanna Spyri
- Produced by: Lazar Wechsler
- Starring: Elsbeth Sigmund; Heinrich Gretler; Thomas Klameth; Elsie Attenhofer
- Cinematography: Emil Berna; Peter Frischknecht
- Edited by: Hermann Haller
- Music by: Robert Blum
- Production company: Praesens-Film
- Distributed by: Schweizer Fernsehen
- Release date: 14 November 1952
- Running time: 97 min
- Country: Switzerland
- Language: German

Heidi (also known as Heidi, Child of the Mountain) is a 1952 black-and-white Swiss family drama film directed by Luigi Comencini and starring Elsbeth Sigmund, Heinrich Gretler and Thomas Klameth. It is based on the first volume of the 1880 novel Heidi (Heidis Lehr- und Wanderjahre) by Johanna Spyri. It was followed by a 1955 sequel Heidi and Peter.

It was shot at the Rosenhof Studios in Zürich and on location took place in the Canton Grisons as well as in Basel. The film's sets were designed by the art director Werner Schlichting. The film is widely considered the best film adaptation of Spyri's book.

== Plot ==
Heidi lives with her grandfather, generally called "Alp-Öhi", in a cottage in the Swiss Alps and enjoys spending time in the mountains with her friend, the goatherd Peter.

The village parson visits the Alp-Öhi. He asks him to come to the village along with Heidi, to attend the installation of the new church bells. Around the installation of the bells, the village festival is held and traditionally it is the children who help hoist up the bells, and Heidi should not be absent. In addition, she could make friends with him and with the children of the village, because soon she should start going to school in the village anyway. The Alp-Öhi is not very happy because he is at odds with the villagers. They accuse him of being responsible for a fire which damaged five houses and the church tower, but the fact is that the Alp-Öhi did not cause the fire and even lost his only son – Heidi's father – fighting the fire. Shortly thereafter, Heidi's mother died from grief over the loss. Aunt Dete, the sister of Heidi's mother, initially cared for the child, but left her with the Alp-Öhi when she got a job in Frankfurt in Germany.

Dete is employed at the Sesemann house as a cook. Mr. Sesemann, a wealthy businessman and a widower, is seeking a companion for his daughter Klara who uses a wheelchair after an illness. Dete suggests Heidi, travels to the village and tricks Heidi into accompanying her back to Frankfurt.

Heidi quickly makes friends with Klara and helps her in every way she can, but Heidi's natural and spirited manner continually exasperates prissy Miss Rottenmeyer, Klara's governess. All the other staff grow very fond of Heidi, especially Sebastian, the butler. All the while Heidi hopes to eventually be allowed to return home to her beloved mountains and grandfather. Eventually a minor miracle occurs: Klara, lovingly cared for by Heidi, begins to walk again. When Mr. Sesemann returns from a long trip, he is overjoyed when he sees his child making a few steps towards him. Out of gratitude for Heidi's accomplishing this miracle, he decrees that she shall stay indefinitely, but this secretly throws her into despair because of her homesickness.

Soon afterward the household is disturbed by what seem to be nightly appearances of a ghost. These are revealed by Mr. Sesemann and Doctor Classen, the family doctor and a good friend, to actually being Heidi sleep-walking around the house. Recognizing this as a symptom of deep emotional distress, Dr. Classen advises Mr. Sesemann to let Heidi return home immediately, back to her grandfather and the mountains. It is also decided that Klara shall visit Heidi soon during the holidays.

Heidi's return finally resolves the conflict between Alp-Öhi and the villagers, and on Sunday Heidi and her grandfather join the villagers for church service.

== Cast ==
- Elsbeth Sigmund as Heidi
- Heinrich Gretler as Alp-Öhi
- Thomas Klameth as goatherd
- Elsie Attenhofer as aunt Dete
- Margrit Rainer as Peter's mother
- Fred Tanner as pastor
- Isa Günther as Klara Sesemann
- Willy Birgel as Mr. Sesemann
- Traute Carlsen as Klaras grandmother
- Anita Mey as Miss Rottenmeyer
- Theo Lingen as Sebastian
- Max Haufler as baker
- Armin Schweizer as cathedral porter

== Bibliography ==
- Bergfelder, Tim & Bock, Hans-Michael. The Concise Cinegraph: Encyclopedia of German. Berghahn Books, 2009.
