= Richard Schweizer =

Swiss screenwriter

- Born: 23 December 1899; Zurich, Switzerland
- Died: 30 March 1965 (aged 65); Zurich, Switzerland
- Occupations: Writer, Screenwriter
- Years active: 1931-1964

Richard Schweizer (23 December 1899 – 30 March 1965) was a Swiss screenwriter who won the Academy Award for Best Original Screenplay in 1945 for his work in Marie-Louise, as well as the Academy Award for Best Story in 1948 for his work in The Search. Schweizer also directed the film Kleine Scheidegg (1937).

== Selected filmography ==
=== Director ===
- Kleine Scheidegg (1937)

=== Screenwriter ===
- Füsilier Wipf (1938)
- Constable Studer (1939)
- Gilberte de Courgenay (1942)
- Marie-Louise (1944)
- The Search (1948)
- Swiss Tour (1949)
- Heidi (1952)
- Uli the Tenant (1955)
- The Mountains Between Us (1956)
- The Cheese Factory in the Hamlet (1958)

== See also ==
- List of Swiss Academy Award winners and nominees
