= Swiss Tour =

1949 film by Leopold Lindtberg

- Directed by: Leopold Lindtberg
- Written by: Ring Lardner Jr.; Richard Schweizer
- Produced by: Oscar Düby; Lazar Wechsler; Lou Wechsler
- Starring: Cornel Wilde; Josette Day; Simone Signoret
- Cinematography: Emil Berna
- Music by: Robert Blum
- Production company: Praesens-Film
- Distributed by: Praesens-Film (Switzerland); Film Classics (US)
- Release date: November 29, 1949 (Switzerland)
- Running time: 79 minutes
- Countries: Switzerland; United States
- Languages: German; English

Swiss Tour (or Four Days Leave) is a 1949 American-Swiss drama film directed by Leopold Lindtberg and starring Cornel Wilde, Josette Day and Simone Signoret. It marked the film debut of Liselotte Pulver who went on to be a major star of German cinema during the following decade.

== Plot ==
Five American soldiers stationed in Mulhouse, Alsace, take four days off to spend a short vacation in nearby Switzerland. Sailor Stanley Robin wants to bring back a typical Swiss souvenir from this trip. In Montreux, he discovers a typical Swiss watch in a jeweler's window, which he is particularly intrigued by. But he shows even greater interest in the shop's charming saleswoman, Suzanne, a French-speaking Swiss. He wants to marry her immediately and take her back to the USA as his bride. Suzanne is not particularly enthusiastic about this idea and escapes the love-struck G.I. with a short vacation in the Alps. In Zermatt, the young blonde wants to go skiing for a few days, but has no idea that Stanley is already on her heels. The Navy boy takes the train to Zermatt and tracks down his sweetheart against the backdrop of the Matterhorn.

During a chase on skis through the winter landscape, the young woman escapes him again, whereupon the sailor, who is not particularly experienced in winter sports – (as referenced in the German movie title, Ein Seemann ist kein Schneemann) – goes to a bar and tries to drown his sorrows in the presence of several locals. At a dance in the hotel, Stanley meets "modern" Yvonne, the "cheerful existentialist" type with a femme fatale touch. As a self-confident young woman, she sees nothing wrong with chasing men. And so she tries to seduce the somewhat taken aback Stanley. Suzanne observes this with some concern, so she suggests to the sailor that they pretend to be married for a day in order to free him from the clutches of Yvonne. The latter, however, is not prepared to simply leave her sailor to the competition and, with her intrigues, causes misunderstandings and confusion. Eventually, Stanley and Suzanne have their first "marital" argument. In the end, however, everything is resolved, and they meet again on the train ride back. Stanley and Suzanne promise each other they won't separate again.

== Cast ==
- Cornel Wilde as Stanley Robin
- Josette Day as Suzanne
- Simone Signoret as Yvonne
- John Baragrey as Jack
- Richard Erdman as Eddy
- Alan Hale Jr. as Joe
- George O. Petrie as Sidney
- Leopold Biberti as Walter Hochull
- Liselotte Pulver as a GI flirt
- Robert Bichler
- Christiane Martin

== Bibliography ==
- Bock, Hans-Michael & Bergfelder, Tim. The Concise CineGraph. Encyclopedia of German Cinema. Berghahn Books, 2009.
