= Max Haufler =

Swiss actor and film director (1910–1965)

- Born: 4 June 1910; Basel, Switzerland
- Died: 25 June 1965 (aged 55); Zurich, Switzerland
- Occupations: Actor; Film director
- Years active: 1937–1965

Max Haufler (4 June 1910 – 25 June 1965) was a Swiss actor and film director.

== Partial filmography ==
- Le règne de l'esprit malin (1938) - Criblet
- Farinet ou l'or dans la montagne (1939) - Gendarm
- Steibruch (1942) - Näppi
- White Cradle Inn (1947) - Frederick
- Madness Rules (1947) - Pfleger Weyrauch
- After the Storm (1948) - Fotograf Aichinger
- Palace Hotel (1952) - Hunziker, Oberheizer
- Heidi (1952) - Bäcker / Baker
- Uli the Farmhand (1954) - Karrer
- Heidi and Peter (1955) - Bäcker
- The Mountains Between Us (1956) - Federico
- Bäckerei Zürrer (1957) - Dicker - Plattenschieber
- Der 10. Mai (1957) - Neuenschwander
- It Happened in Broad Daylight (1958) - Tavern Patron
- Ludmila (1958) - Alois
- The Cheese Factory in the Hamlet (1958) - Eglihannes / Ederhannes
- The Model Husband (1959) - Möbelträger Furrer
- The Man Who Walked Through the Wall (1959) - Herr Katz - der Gescheite
- Hinter den sieben Gleisen (1959) - Barbarossa
- Anne Bäbi Jowäger (1960) - Vehhansli
- Der Teufel hat gut lachen (1960) - Barbarossa
- Town Without Pity (1961) - Dr. Urban
- The Marriage of Mr. Mississippi (1961) - Van Bosch
- Chikita (1961) - Dr. Markus Steiger
- Freud: The Secret Passion (1962) - Audience Member at Final Lecture (uncredited)
- The Trial (1962) - Uncle Max
- Anne Bäbi Jowäger - II. Teil: Jakobli und Meyeli (1962) - Vehhansli
- Miracle of the White Stallions (1963) - Engineer
- The River Line (1964) - Dubois, Lagerverwalter
- Geld und Geist (1964) - Dorngrütbauer
- Morituri (1965) - Branner
