= Feind im Blut =

1931 film

- Directed by: Walter Ruttmann
- Written by: Walther Ruttmann; Lazar Wechsler; Gerhard Bienert
- Produced by: Lazar Wechsler
- Cinematography: Georges C. Stilly; Emil Berna
- Edited by: Walther Ruttmann; Georges C. Stilly
- Music by: Wolfgang Zeller
- Production company: Praesens-Film
- Release date: 14 April 1931
- Running time: 74 minutes
- Countries: Switzerland; Germany
- Language: German

Feind im Blut (English: Enemy in the Blood) is a 1931 Swiss-German drama film directed by Walter Ruttmann. It tells three stories about people who become infected with syphilis. There are also documentary parts with information about the disease. The film was co-produced with several organisations focused on combatting sexually transmitted infections.

== Plot ==
A student learns that his girlfriend has been unfaithful. He goes out for a night on the town with a friend. The friend spends the night with a waitress and catches syphilis.

A mechanic tries to cure his syphilis by going to a quack. It does not help him. His wife gives birth to a child infected with the disease and commits suicide.

A married woman attends dancing classes. There she meets a young man who gives her syphilis.

== Cast ==
- Gerhard Bienert as mechanic
- Ilse Stobrawa as mechanic's wife
- Wolfgang Klein as student
- Walburga Gmür as student's girlfriend Lili
- Helmut Krauss as student's friend
- Margarete Kupfer as quack
- Ruth Albu as married woman

== Production ==
The film was made to inform and warn the public about syphilis. It was produced by Praesens-Film in collaboration with the Swiss Society to Combat Sexually Transmitted Diseases, the German Association for the Fight Against Sexually Transmitted Diseases and the Main Health Department of the City of Berlin. Filming took place from 9 February to 27 March 1931 in Berlin and Zürich, with studio scenes in the Lignose-Hörfilm Atelier and Grunewald-Atelier in Berlin.

== Release ==
The film was released in Germany on 14 April 1931. It premiered in Switzerland on 18 April the same year.
