= Alfred Rasser =

- Alfred Rasser on HD-Soldat Läppli
- Born: 29 May 1907; Basel, Canton of Basel-Stadt, Switzerland
- Died: 18 August 1977 (aged 70); Basel
- Occupations: Cabarettist, comedian, stage, television and film actor, politician
- Years active: 1928–1977
- Spouse(s): Adele Schnell (1932) and Simone Petitpierre (born Ninette Rosselat, 1947)
- Children: Roland Rasser

Alfred Rasser (29 May 1907 – 18 August 1977) was a Swiss comedian, radio personality, and stage and film actor who starred predominantly in Swiss German-language cinema and television and stage productions, but he was also known for the role of Theophil Läppli, a parody on the Swiss militarism.

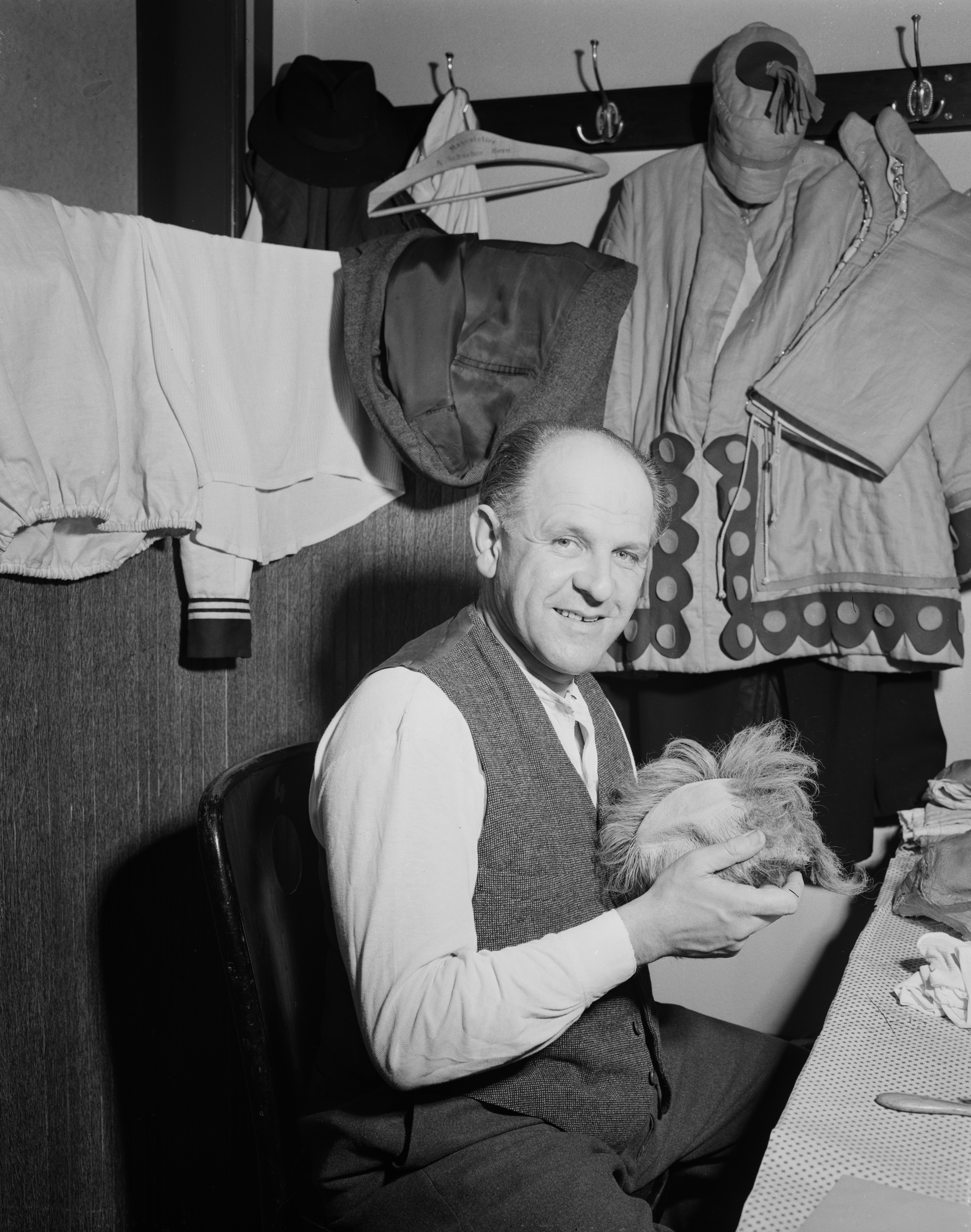
Alfred Rasser, ca. 1950-1960

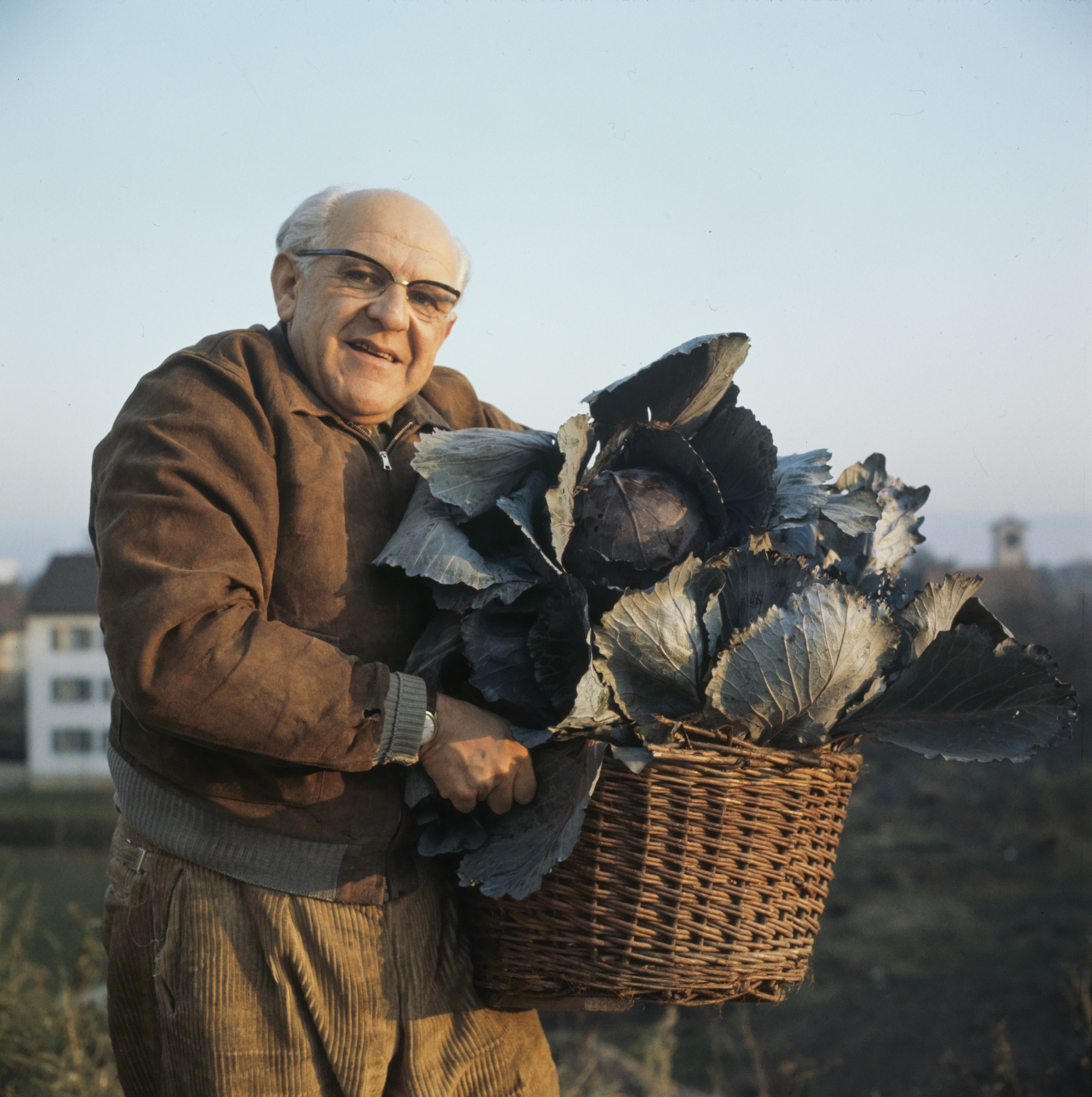
Alfred Rasser, ca. 1964

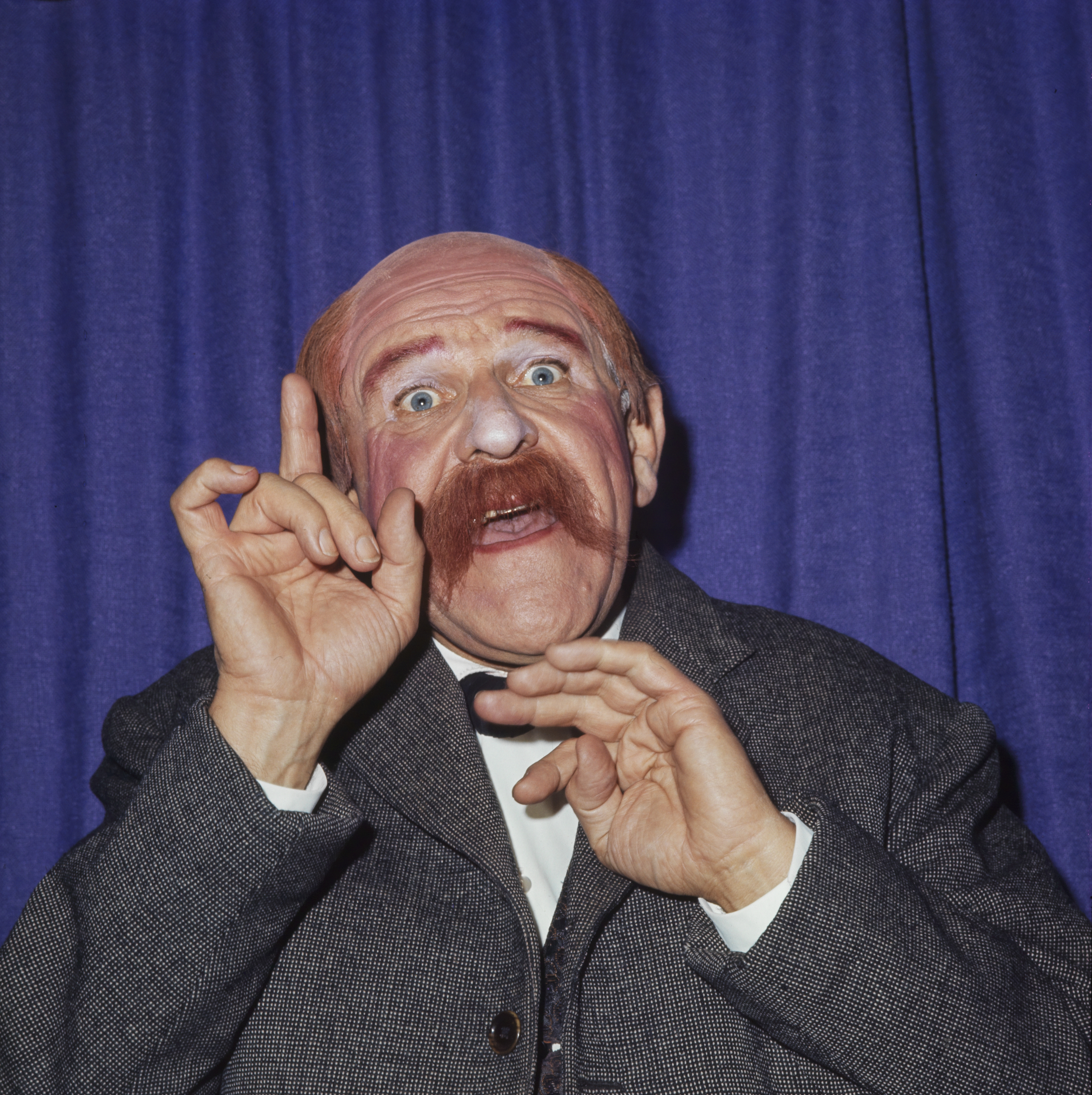
Alfred Rasser, ca. 1964 (Foto Comet, ETH-Bibliothek)

== Early life and education ==
Born and raised in Basel, Canton of Basel-Stadt in Switzerland as son of Berta née Stump and Emil, Rasser's father died when Alfred was 11 years old. Berta Rasser had now, for Alfred and his three siblings, to earn the family's keep. After his apprenticeship as a merchant at Jacky Maeder & Cie to 1922, he attended drama school for the first time, and found his true passion. To have an income, Alfred Rasser tried among others as a chicken farmer in the Canton of Ticino in 1928. From 1928 to 1930 Rasser took acting lessons at Oskar Wälterlin and body workout at Rosalia Chladek at the Basel conservatory. Upon completion of the drama school, in 1930 he founded his own theater company, but graduated in 1934 at the Basel conservatory.

== Theatre, solo-program and film ==
Meanwhile, he premiered at the Stadttheater Basel, among others in Robert Cedric Sheriffs "Die andere Seite" and in Stravinsky's ballets "Petrushka" and "Pulcinella". In the war year of 1940 Rasser also starred at the Corso-Theater at the present Bellevueplatz in Zürich in Gilberte de Courgenay. At the Bernhard-Theater Zürich, and at the Schauspielhaus Zürich Rasser appeared in comedies and classic dramas. Rasser played on numerous Swiss theaters, including the role of the frog in Johann Strauss' Die Fledermaus in Lausanne and at the Opéra du Rhin in Strasbourg in 1961, and in 1963 in Gogol's "The Government Inspector". Rasser also appeared with Charles F. Vaucher at the Küchlintheater Basel, and among many others, he appeared in the musical "Spalebärg 77a" by the popular radio show of Margrit Rainer and Ruedi Walter in 1964.

Between 1952 and 1975 Rasser also starred in one-man programs in southern Germany and Switzerland, among other things, as member of the Fauteuil ensemble in Basel. His son Roland founded the theater in 1957, where Rasser had his last great appearance in the revue "Offenbach am Spalenberg" in 1976.

Along with the Läppli films, Alfred Rasser starred in German language films, among others in Füsilier Wipf in 1938 and the Ueli films in the 1940s, but also Wilhelm Tell in 1960 and Die plötzliche Einsamkeit des Konrad Steiner (The Sudden Loneliness of Konrad Steiner) in 1976.

== Theophil Läppli ==
But above all, Rasser was a popular cabaret artist and comedian: In 1935 he joined the newly founded Cabaret Resslirytti Basel, for the first program of his later most popular role of Theophil Läppli. From 1935 to 1941 Rasser belonged with a short interruption to the ensemble of the Cabaret Cornichon in Zürich, where he stood out in particular through its parodies of Basel arrogance and independent line. In 1943 Rasser founded in Basel the satirical political Kabaret Kactus which became very successful. On 31 December 1945, written and produced by Rasser HD-Soldat Läppli premiered, a mixture of cabaret and folk theater, which was so successful that the production had to move into the larger Küchlin Theater. Jaroslav Hašek's The Good Soldier Švejk modeled the figure of the Swiss Army subsidiary soldier Theophil Läppli – militarism mocking, it became Rasser's trademark. This was followed by the comedy "Demokrat Läppli" (1947) and, with little success, by the musical "Weltenbürger Läppli" (1949). Besides, Rasser played with the Kabaret Kactus number cabaret and directed his Swiss German version of Mary Chase's Harvey starring himself in 1950. In 1958 Eynar Grabowsky organized a tour with the comedy "Millionär Läppli", and in 1969 followed by the popular play "Zivilverteidiger Läppli". Rasser participated in several Swiss films: "HD-Soldat Läppli" (1960) and "Demokrat Läppli" (1961) were filmed for the cinema.

== Politics ==
Rasser was part of a Swiss cultural delegation to China in 1954/55 and this led to his being branded a "communist" by Swiss nationalists. He was politically active and was elected to the Nationalrat as a representative of the Landesring der Unabhängigen (LdU) between 1967 and 1975, where he stood for peace, social justice and culture.

== Personal life ==
In the early 1930, however, Alfred Rasser was not able to live from his income as artist, and therefore he also led his own painter company from 1930 to 1935. From 1932 to 1945 Rasser was married to Adele Schnell in first marriage; from the marriage emerged their son Roland Rasser. In 1947 Rasser married Ninette Rosselat; they had three children.

== Filmography ==
- 1937: La faute de l'abbé Mouret
- 1938: Füsilier Wipf - Notar
- 1940: Fräulein Huser - Kramer - Erfinder
- 1940: Die mißbrauchten Liebesbriefe - Viggi Störteler
- 1941: Emil, mer mues halt rede mitenand - Rudi Wiederkehr
- 1942: Das Gespensterhaus - Dr. Loosli / Prof. Gábor Károly
- 1951: Die Tat des Anderen
- 1952: Palace Hotel - Leblanc, Küchenchef
- 1952: The Merry Vineyard - Herr Zigerli
- 1954: Uli, der Knecht (Uli, the Servant - international English title) - Baumwollhändler
- 1954: Frühlingslied
- 1954: Läppli am Zoll (Short) - Theophil Läppli
- 1955: Uli, der Pächter - Baumwollhändler, ihr Mann
- 1956: S'Waisechind vo Engelberg
- 1957: Der 10. Mai - Automobilist
- 1959: HD-Soldat Läppli - HD-Soldat Läppli
- 1961: Wilhelm Tell - Saufkumpan
- 1961: Demokrat Läppli - Theophil Läppli
- 1970: Keine Angst Liebling, ich pass schon auf - Concierge Stierli
- 1971: Immer die verflixten Weiber - Stirnimann
- 1976: Die plötzliche Einsamkeit des Konrad Steiner (The Sudden Loneliness of Konrad Steiner) - Hans Sonderegger (final film role)

== Literature ==
- Franz Rüeb: Alfred Rasser. Verlagsgenossenschaft Zürich 1975.
