= Heinrich Fueter =

Swiss film producer (1911–1979)

- Born: 17 February 1911; Zurich, Switzerland
- Died: 13 October 1979 (aged 68); Zurich, Switzerland
- Education: University of Zurich
- Occupation: Film producer
- Spouse: Anne-Marie Blanc
- Children: Peter Christian, Martin Andreas
- Father: Eduard Fueter
- Relatives: Eduard Fueter (brother); Karl Rudolf Fueter (uncle); Robert Faesi (stepfather)

Heinrich Fueter (17 February 1911 – 13 October 1979) was a Swiss film producer. He was production manager of Praesens Film AG in 1939, and in 1947 he founded his own company, Condor Films. He produced numerous documentary and commissioned films.

== Biography ==
Heinrich Fueter was born on 17 February 1911 in Zurich, the son of Eduard Fueter. He was the brother of Eduard Fueter and a nephew of Karl Rudolf Fueter. He married Anne-Marie Blanc. Fueter spent his youth in the house of his mother and her second husband, Robert Faesi, a professor of German literature in Zurich. In 1938 he obtained a doctorate in law from the University of Zurich.

In 1939 Fueter was production manager of Praesens Film AG and head of coordination of the 1939 National Exhibition. He was responsible for setting up the army section Heer und Haus (Army and Home). He initiated the Studio Bellerive for Gloriafilm AG. In 1947 he founded his own company, Condor Films AG, and produced numerous documentary and commissioned films. In 1966, for health reasons, he handed over the management of the company to his sons Peter Christian (born 1941) and Martin Andreas (born 1944). He died on 13 October 1979 in Zurich.

== Bibliography ==
- H. Dumont, Geschichte des Schweizer Films, 1987
