= Fusilier Wipf =

- Directed by: Hermann Haller; Leopold Lindtberg
- Based on: Füsilier Wipf (1917 novella) by Robert Faesi
- Starring: Paul Hubschmid; Heinrich Gretler; Robert Trösch; Zarli Carigiet
- Cinematography: Emil Berna
- Edited by: Käthe Mey; Hermann Haller
- Music by: Robert Blum
- Production company: Praesens-Film
- Distributed by: Praesens-Film
- Release date: 1938
- Country: Switzerland
- Language: Swiss German

Fusilier Wipf (German: Füsilier Wipf) is a 1938 Swiss drama film directed by Hermann Haller and Leopold Lindtberg and starring Paul Hubschmid, Heinrich Gretler and Robert Trösch. Adapted from Robert Faesi’s 1917 novella, it follows a hairdresser’s assistant conscripted during the First World War who matures into a thoughtful and responsible person. The film was one of Praesens-Film’s Swiss German productions associated with Switzerland’s geistige Landesverteidigung. It drew 1.25 million admissions in Switzerland, making it one of the country’s most successful films of the period.

== Synopsis ==
During the First World War, a young Swiss hairdresser’s assistant is conscripted into military service during the border occupation and matures into a thoughtful and responsible person. After returning from military service, he changes his life, breaks off his engagement to his master’s daughter, and moves to the countryside with a farmer’s daughter.

== Cast ==
The cast includes:

- Paul Hubschmid as Reinhold Wipf
- Heinrich Gretler as Leu
- Robert Trösch as Meisterhans
- Zarli Carigiet as Schatzli
- Max Werner Lenz as Hungerbühler
- Wolfgang Heinz as Czech refugee
- Sigfrit Steiner as Oberleutnant
- Erwin Kalser as Herr Godax
- Lisa Della Casa as Vreneli
- Emil Hegetschweiler as Coiffeur Wiederkehr
- Elsie Attenhofer as Rosa Wiederkehr
- Alfred Rasser as Notar Schnurrenberger

== Production ==
The film was adapted from Robert Faesi’s 1917 novella Füsilier Wipf. Faesi’s novella has been described as associated with Switzerland’s geistige Landesverteidigung.

== Release and reception ==
The film drew 1.25 million admissions in Switzerland after its 1938 release, at a time when the country had a population of about 4.2 million. It was also one of the five most successful Swiss films released between 1938 and 1943

On 24 January 1939, Fusilier Wipf was screened in Paris at the Maison de la Chimie for the benefit of Swiss charitable works. Guests then attended a reception at the new Swiss legation hosted by Minister Walter Stucki and his wife.

== Bibliography ==
- Bergfelder, Tim & Bock, Hans-Michael. The Concise Cinegraph: Encyclopedia of German. Berghahn Books, 2009.
