= Elsie Attenhofer =

Swiss cabaret artiste, actress, writer and performer of monologues

Elsie Attenhofer (born 21 February 1909 in Lugano, died 16 September 1999 in Bassersdorf) was a Swiss cabaret artiste, actress, writer and performer of monologues.

== Life and work ==
Her parents were hoteliers in Lugano. In 1931, she became one of the first Swiss women to hold a private pilot's licence. Her first job was as a secretary to a neurologist.

In 1934, she joined the Cabaret Cornichon, known throughout Switzerland for its caustic satire, and she remained an important member of the company until 1942. Her stage partners included Max Werner Lenz and Voli Geiler. She married the germanist, Karl Schmid in 1940: there were two children from the marriage, a son and a daughter, born in 1942 and 1943 respectively. In 1943, she wrote the period piece, Wer wirft den ersten Stein? (Who will throw the first stone?) – an indictment against anti-Semitism in Switzerland. However, it was considered too controversial by the Schauspielhaus Zürich, a view shared soon afterwards by the Basler Stadttheater. It was not until October 1944, with Hitler’s downfall looming, that the play was first performed (to rave reviews) by an ad hoc company at a private theatre in Basel. With the war over, she immediately went to Germany, where she met the master of political innuendo, Werner Finck. He engaged her to appear at his theatre, ‘Die Mausefalle’, (The Mousetrap) in Stuttgart, but – ever the individualist – Attenhofer did not want to lose her independence. Instead she wrote her ‘One-Woman-Show’, a compilation of the best of the Cornichon sketches. Leaving her family behind, she toured Europe with it in the 1970s, performing in four languages.

In her 1989 retrospective, Réserve du Patron, Attenhofer held an imaginary conversation with her late husband about their lives. In 1990 she was awarded the Oberrheinischen Kulturpreis by the Goethe Foundation in Basel; eight years later she was honoured with the gold medal of the Canton of Zürich for her understanding of democracy and her humanity.

== Filmography ==
| Year | Title | Role | Notes |
|---|---|---|---|
| 1935 | Jä-soo! | Nellie Stäubli | |
| 1935 | Zyt ischt Gält | Frau Honegger | |
| 1938 | Fusilier Wipf | Rosa Wiederkehr | |
| 1940 | Fräulein Huser | Colette | |
| 1940 | Die mißbrauchten Liebesbriefe | Anneli - Gritlis Freundin | |
| 1942 | De Winzig simuliert | Anni | |
| 1949 | Familie M | Anna Moser | |
| 1952 | Heidi | Tante Dete / Heidi's aunt Dete | |
| 1957 | The Daring Swimmer | Tante Katie | |
