= Robert Trösch =

Swiss actor

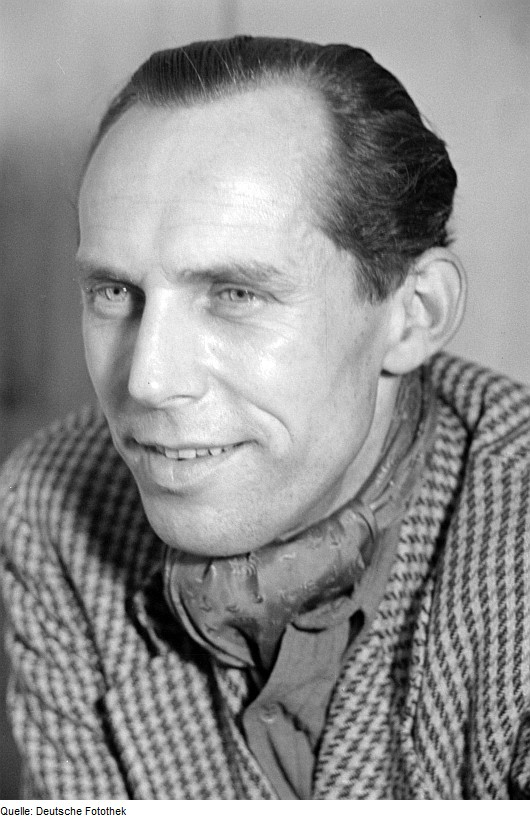
Robert Trösch, Swiss actor (1911-1986

Robert Trösch (25 November 1911 – 14 January 1986) was a Swiss actor.

== Selected filmography ==
- Jä-soo! (1935)
- Bortsy (1936)
- Fusilier Wipf (1938)
- Constable Studer (1939)
- Wilder Urlaub (1943)
- Saure Wochen - frohe Feste (1950)
- Ernst Thälmann (1954)
- Nelken in Aspik (1976)
