= Hermann Haller (film editor) =

- Born: 15 December 1909
- Died: 21 June 1985 (aged 75)
- Occupations: Film editor, film director

Hermann Haller (15 December 1909 – 21 June 1985) was a Swiss film editor. He also directed four films.

== Selected filmography ==
Editor

- The Theft of the Mona Lisa (1931)
- Marriage with Limited Liability (1931)
- The Rebel (1932)
- For Once I'd Like to Have No Troubles (1932)
- The Castle in the South (1933)
- Dream Castle (1933)
- Song of Farewell (1934)
- Spring Parade (1934)
- Farewell Waltz (1934)
- Hearts are Trumps (1934)
- Stradivari (1935)
- Stradivarius (1935)
- Winter Night's Dream (1935)
- Variety (1935)
- Harvest (1936)
- Girls' Dormitory (1936)
- Lumpaci the Vagabond (1936)
- The Castle in Flanders (1936)
- The Charm of La Boheme (1937)
- Premiere (1937)
- Fusilier Wipf (1938)
- Mirror of Life (1938)
- Flower of the Tisza (1939)
- Between River and Steppe (1939)
- Gilberte de Courgenay (1942)
- Johann (1943)
- Marie-Louise (1944)
- Madness Rules (1947)
- The Search (1948)
- After the Storm (1948)
- A Kingdom for a Horse (1949)
- Palace Hotel (1952)
- Heidi (1952)
- Heidi and Peter (1955)
- The Man Who Walked Through the Wall (1959)
- Peter Voss, Hero of the Day (1959)
- The Juvenile Judge (1960)
- Yes, Women are Dangerous (1960)
- Grounds for Divorce (1960)
- The Good Soldier Schweik (1960)
- The Marriage of Mr. Mississippi (1961)
- The Liar (1961)
- Jakobli and Meyeli (1962)
- The Invisible Dr. Mabuse (1962)
- Snow White and the Seven Jugglers (1962)
- The Invisible Dr. Mabuse (1962)
- Rampage at Apache Wells (1965)
- The Last Tomahawk (1965)
- The Doctor Speaks Out (1966)
- The Valley of Death (1968)
- Death in the Red Jaguar (1968)
- Death and Diamonds (1968)
- Helgalein (1969)
- Rabbit in the Pit (1969)
- We'll Take Care of the Teachers (1970)
