= Armin Schweizer =

Swiss actor

- Born: 28 April 1892; Zurich, Switzerland
- Died: 8 October 1968 (aged 76); Zurich, Switzerland
- Occupation: actor
- Years active: 1918–1961

Armin Schweizer (28 April 1892 – 8 October 1968) was a Swiss actor.

Schweizer was born in Zurich, Switzerland and died there at age 76.

== Selected filmography ==
- The Pied Piper of Hamelin (1918)
- The Galley Slave (1919)
- The Mayor of Zalamea (1920)
- Jakko (1941)
- The Lost Valley (1934)
- Stradivari (1935)
- The Man with the Paw (1935)
- August der Starke (1936)
- Der Kaiser von Kalifornien (1936)
- The Merry Wives (1936)
- Kleine Scheidegg (1937)
- The Mountain Calls (1938)
- Nanon (1938)
- Bachelor's Paradise (1939)
- Constable Studer (1939)
- Man for Man (1939)
- Who's Kissing Madeleine? (1939)
- The Three Codonas (1940)
- Jakko (1941)
- Riding for Germany (1941)
- Münchhausen (1943)
- Young Hearts (1944)
- Madness Rules (1947)
- An Everyday Story (1948)
- After the Storm (1948)
- Heidi (1952)
- Bandits of the Autobahn (1955)
- Bäckerei Zürrer (1957)
- William Tell (1961)

== Bibliography ==
- Buache, Freddy. Le cinéma suisse, 1898-1998. L'AGE D'HOMME, 1998.
