= Kurt Guggenheim =

Swiss writer (1896–1983)

- Born: 14 January 1896; Zurich, Switzerland
- Died: 5 December 1983 (aged 87); Zurich, Switzerland
- Occupations: Writer; screenwriter
- Spouse: Gertrud Kloter (née Schlozer) (m. 1939)
- Parents: Hermann Guggenheim (father); Frieda Ris (mother)
- Awards: Conrad Ferdinand Meyer Prize (1943); Literature prize of the city of Zurich (1955); Schiller Prize (1960)

Kurt Guggenheim (14 January 1896 – 5 December 1983) was a Swiss writer. After the bankruptcy of the coffee import firm he had taken over from his father, he lived as a freelance writer from 1934. His novel Riedland (1938) was his literary breakthrough. He worked on the screenplays of several productions of Praesens Film AG, among them Wachtmeister Studer, and wrote the four-volume autobiographical novel Alles in Allem (1952–1955), which depicts Swiss history between 1900 and 1945.

== Biography ==
Kurt Guggenheim was born on 14 January 1896 in Zurich, the son of Hermann Guggenheim, a merchant, and Frieda Ris. In 1939 he married Gertrud Kloter, née Schlozer, a widow.

Guggenheim attended a commercial school (Handelsschule) and served a commercial apprenticeship in Le Havre in Normandy. He spent periods in the Netherlands, France, England and Belgium. He worked as an antiquarian bookseller in Zurich. After the bankruptcy of the coffee import firm he had taken over from his father, he lived as a freelance writer from 1934.

Guggenheim's literary breakthrough came in 1938 with the novel Riedland. He worked on the screenplays of several productions of Praesens Film AG, among them Wachtmeister Studer and Wilder Urlaub, which was based on a novel of his own. In 1949 he published Wir waren unser vier (We were four), a skeptical yet loyal chronicle of the Second World War in novel form. His four-volume autobiographical novel Alles in Allem (All in all, 1952–1955) depicts Swiss history between 1900 and 1945.

Guggenheim received the Conrad Ferdinand Meyer Prize in 1943, (Note: Sources disagree: the Historical Dictionary of Switzerland dates the prize to 1943, while the Conrad Ferdinand Meyer Foundation's list of laureates gives 1944.) the literature prize of the city of Zurich in 1955 and the prize of the Swiss Schiller Foundation (Schiller Prize) in 1960. He died in Zurich on 5 December 1983.

== Bibliography ==
- Kosch, Deutsches Literatur-Lexikon, 6, 1032

=== Archives ===
- Zentralbibliothek Zürich: personal papers (Nachlass)
