= White Cradle Inn =

- Directed by: Harold French
- Written by: Harold French; Lesley Storm
- Produced by: Ivor Mclaren
- Cinematography: Derick Williams
- Edited by: Bert Bates
- Music by: Dr. Bernard Grun
- Production company: Peak Films
- Distributed by: British Lion Films (UK)
- Release date: March 1947 (UK)
- Running time: 83 minutes
- Country: United Kingdom
- Language: English
- Budget: £135,000
- Box office: £104,411

White Cradle Inn (U.S. title High Fury) is a 1947 British drama film directed by Harold French and starring Madeleine Carroll, Ian Hunter, and Michael Rennie. It was written by French and Lesley Storm, and filmed on location in Switzerland and at Shepperton Studios. In Switzerland after the Second World War, a French evacuee boy wants to stay there rather than return home, leading to a moral dilemma.

It is the first film to feature the self-sacrifice of cutting a rope to save others attached.

== Plot ==
The White Cradle Inn and its estates lie in a picturesque valley in the Swiss Alps. For generations it has been the property of the family of innkeeper Magda, who now lives there with her philandering husband Rudolph.

The story is set during WWII, and a teenage French orphan named Roger is billeted with the couple, as are many French children evacuated to families in the valley. When the time comes for the children to return to France, Magda is keen to adopt Roger, but Rudolph has taken a dislike to him, calling him a coward. Rudolph only finally agrees to sign the adoption papers if Magda will sign over the ownership of the Inn to him. She agrees to do this, but when the boy, anxious to prove he is no coward, urges Rudolph to take him on a climbing trip to the mountains, it is a journey that will have fatal consequences.

At the summit of an Alpine peak Roger slips. He is roped to Rudi. He catches a tree on a very steep slope. When Rudi tries to get down he too slips, and is left dangling below Roger. His weight is going to pull Roger off so he cuts the rope to save Roger, instantly falling to his death.

== Cast ==
- Madeleine Carroll as Magda
- Ian Hunter as Anton
- Michael Rennie as Rudolph
- Anne-Marie Blanc as Louise
- Michael McKeag as Roger
- Arnold Marlé as Joseph
- Willy Fueter as Bernard (Benny)
- Margarete Hoff as Maria
- Max Haufler as Frederick
- Gerhard Kempinski as President

== Production ==
The film was based on an original story by director Harold French and was shot at Isleworth Studios and on location in Switzerland. French later recalled:

Filming had to stop because the money had run out. I didn’t mind as long as they paid the actors, which they did; I didn’t get all my money from that one. I got on well with Madeleine Carroll but I didn’t think she was a very good actress, frankly. I don’t think Ian Hunter was terribly good either — a bit stolid. It would have been a better picture with a stronger man. But Michael Rennie was marvellous in it, I thought. I liked that film because I thought it had a lot of atmosphere, because I used Swiss actors quite a lot.

== Reception ==
=== Critical ===
Variety commented that "the characters here rarely come to life", criticising direction and performances, before concluding, "Madeleine Carroll may prove something of a draw, but the picture will need plenty of selling, both here and in America." TV Guide wrote, "The chances for a strong drama here were excellent, but the treatment never lives up to the potential. The actors give weak characterizations, never injecting the needed emotion for the story to work. There is some good-looking Alpine scenery, but this doesn't compensate for the film's weaknesses."

The Radio Times noted, "Despite Ian Hunter offering Carroll gallant support as the local doctor, the performances are slightly strained, with McKeag being a weak link. But the dénouement is authentic and tense."

=== Box Office ===
As of 30 June 1949 the film earned £99,666 in the UK of which £72,473 went to the producer.
