= Constable Studer =

- Directed by: Leopold Lindtberg
- Written by: Friedrich Glauser (novel); Horst Budjuhn; Kurt Guggenheim; Richard Schweizer
- Produced by: Lazar Wechsler
- Starring: Heinrich Gretler; Adolf Manz; Anne-Marie Blanc
- Cinematography: Emil Berna
- Edited by: Käthe Mey
- Music by: Robert Blum
- Production companies: Praesens Film, Zürich
- Release date: 13 October 1939
- Running time: 112 minutes
- Country: Switzerland
- Language: Swiss German

Constable Studer (German: Wachtmeister Studer) is a 1939 Swiss crime film directed by Leopold Lindtberg and starring Heinrich Gretler, Adolf Manz and Anne-Marie Blanc. The film is based on a novel by Friedrich Glauser. Set in 1930s Switzerland, it follows Studer as he investigates a death in woodland. It was followed by Matto regiert (1947), which also starred Gretler as Studer.

== Synopsis ==
Set in 1930s Switzerland, the film follows Constable Studer as he investigates the death of Wendelin Witschi, whose body is found in woodland. As Studer takes over the case, it is unclear whether Witschi died by manslaughter, murder or suicide.

== Cast ==
Anne-Marie Blanc, who later became one of Switzerland’s best-known actresses, had her first film role in Wachtmeister Studer. The film also marked the first screen appearance of Lukas Ammann, who later achieved wide popularity in German television through his role as Graf Yoster.

The cast includes:

- Heinrich Gretler as Wachtmeister Hermann Studer
- Bertha Danegger as Mutter Aeschbacher
- Anne-Marie Blanc as Sonja Witschi
- Adolf Manz as Aeschbacher, the mayor
- Armin Schweizer as Gottlieb Ellenberger
- Ellen Widmann as Anastasia Witschi
- Robert Troesch as Armin Witschi
- Robert Bichler as Erwin Schlumpf
- Hans Kaes as Murmann, a police officer
- Zarli Carigiet as Schreier
- Rudolf Bernhard as Schwomm
- Sigfrit Steiner as Dr. Steffen, the examining magistrate

== Production ==
The film was produced by Praesens Film in Zürich. It was shot in July and August 1939, with interior scenes filmed at the Rosenhof studio in Zürich. The production cost about 106,000 Swiss francs. It was digitised in 2007 by Schweizer Fernsehen and the Cinémathèque suisse, with support from Memoriav.

== Reception ==
The film has been described as a carefully staged crime film based on a novel by Friedrich Glauser, whose atmosphere is shaped by humanity and integrity. Later commentary has compared Studer to Georges Simenon’s Maigret and noted that Heinrich Gretler became strongly associated with the role.
