= Palace Hotel (film) =

- Directed by: Emil Berna; Leonard Steckel
- Written by: William Michael Treichlinger
- Produced by: Oscar Düby
- Starring: Paul Hubschmid; Käthe Gold; Anne-Marie Blanc
- Cinematography: Konstantin Irmen-Tschet
- Edited by: Hermann Haller
- Music by: Walter Baumgartner
- Production company: Gloria Film
- Release date: 14 April 1952
- Running time: 90 minutes
- Countries: Switzerland; West Germany
- Language: German

Palace Hotel (German: Palast Hotel) is a 1952 Swiss-West German drama film directed by Emil Berna and Leonard Steckel and starring Paul Hubschmid, Käthe Gold and Anne-Marie Blanc. It was made at the Bellerive Studios in Zürich. The film's sets were designed by the art director Jean d'Eaubonne.

== Cast ==
- Paul Hubschmid as Fredy
- Käthe Gold as Emilie, Zimmermädchen
- Anne-Marie Blanc as Inhaberin des Hotels
- Claude Farell as Madame Perrat
- Liliana Tellini as Speranza, Zimmermädchen
- Gustav Knuth as Loosli, Kellermeister
- Emil Hegetschweiler as Staub, Zimmerkellner
- Zarli Carigiet as Giachem, Konditor
- Max Haufler as Hunziker, Oberheizer
- Alfred Rasser as Leblanc, Küchenchef
- Otto Zehnder as Walter, Emilies Sohn
- Margrit Rainer as Hilde Staub, Telefonistin
- Helen Vita as Fräulein Lüthi, Telefonistin
- Walburga Gmür as Frau Muffler, Putzfrau
- Sigfrit Steiner as Gloor, Buchhalter
- Lys Assia as Schlager-Sängerin
- Heinz Woester as Konsul Rainer
- Lukas Ammann as Dr. Suvalà
- Else Bötticher as Frau Rainer
- Schaggi Streuli as Buol, Präsident eines Sportvereins
- Walo Lüönd as Hotelpage

== Bibliography ==
- Hans-Michael Bock and Tim Bergfelder. The Concise Cinegraph: An Encyclopedia of German Cinema. Berghahn Books, 2009.
