= Roman Clemens =

German stage designer (1910–1992)

- Born: Herbert Hermann Clemens; 11 February 1910; Dessau, Germany
- Died: 3 February 1992 (aged 81); Zurich, Switzerland
- Education: Bauhaus
- Occupations: Stage designer; interior architect; exhibition designer; painter
- Spouse: Elisabeth Hürlimann (m. 1943)
- Father: Paul Clemens

Roman Clemens (born Herbert Hermann Clemens; 11 February 1910 – 3 February 1992) was a German stage designer, interior architect, exhibition designer and painter who worked in Zurich. A student of the Bauhaus, he was head of design at the Stadttheater Zürich from 1932 to 1943, where he designed the sets for the premieres of Alban Berg's Lulu (1937) and Paul Hindemith's Mathis der Maler (1938).

== Biography ==
Roman Clemens was born on 11 February 1910 (Note: Sources disagree: the HDS gives 11 February 1910 as his date of birth, while his GND authority record gives 12 February 1910.) in Dessau, the son of Paul Clemens, a watchmaker. He was a German citizen. In 1943 he married Elisabeth Heilmann (née Hürlimann), a widowed pianist and the daughter of Rudolf Hürlimann.

From 1927 to 1930 Clemens studied at the Bauhaus in Dessau under Wassily Kandinsky, Paul Klee, László Moholy-Nagy and Oskar Schlemmer. From 1932 to 1943 he was head of design (Ausstattungsleiter) at the Stadttheater Zürich, where among other works he designed the sets for the premieres of Alban Berg's Lulu (1937) and Paul Hindemith's Mathis der Maler (1938). After 1945 he worked in Zurich as an interior architect, exhibition designer and painter. His work is characterized by spatial depth and by a transparency of his stage sets achieved through refined lighting. He died on 3 February 1992 in Zurich.

== Bibliography ==
- M. Herold, Roman Clemens, 1991 (with a bibliography)
- Biografisches Lexikon der Schweizer Kunst, 220 f.
