= Kurt Früh =

Swiss film director (1915–1979)

- Born: 12 April 1915; St. Gallen, Switzerland
- Died: 24 March 1979 (aged 63); Boswil, Switzerland
- Occupations: Film director; theatre director
- Spouse: Eva Langraf
- Parents: Huldreich Früh (father); Theres Bscheidl (mother)
- Relatives: Huldreich Georg Früh (brother)

Kurt Früh (12 April 1915 – 24 March 1979) was a Swiss film director. After working in theatre and cabaret, on short films and as head of editing for the Swiss newsreel, he had his breakthrough as a feature film director in 1955 with Polizischt Wäckerli and became known as a director of dialect films, among them Bäckerei Zürrer (1957). From 1964 to 1967 he headed the theatre department of Swiss Television. His last two films, Dällebach Kari (1970) and Der Fall (1972), belong to New Swiss Cinema.

== Biography ==
Kurt Früh was born on 12 April 1915 in St. Gallen, the son of Huldreich Früh, a postal official, and Theres Bscheidl. He was the brother of Huldreich Georg Früh. He married the actress Eva Langraf. In 1926 the family moved to Zurich, where Früh passed his Matura and began studying languages and music at the University of Zurich.

From 1933 Früh was head, writer and director at the Volksbühne Zürich, a theatre influenced by Bertolt Brecht. He also worked as a song editor (Chansonredaktor) for the cabarets Cornichon, Pfeffermühle and Bärentatze, the last of which he had co-founded in Bern in 1936. From that year he made short films and advertising films for Central Film Zürich, partly in collaboration with Hans Richter. From 1940 he was also head of editing (Montagechef) for the Swiss newsreel, the Schweizer Filmwochenschau.

After staging various plays and choral works with music by his brother Huldreich Georg (for example Der neue Columbus with Albert Ehrismann, 1939), Früh worked from 1949 to 1953 as an assistant on the last three films of Leopold Lindtberg. His breakthrough as a feature film director came in 1955 with Polizischt Wäckerli, starring Schaggi Streuli. With Bäckerei Zürrer (1957, with Emil Hegetschweiler), set among tramps, drunkards and small tradespeople in Zurich's Langstrasse quarter, he consolidated his position as a director of dialect films. His following films, for example Café Odéon and Hinter den sieben Gleisen (both 1959), did not reach the same intensity.

Früh then turned away from feature films. From 1964 to 1967 he headed the theatre department of Swiss Television, where he directed numerous productions of his own. As a teacher of the film class of the Kunstgewerbemuseum Zürich from 1967 to 1969, he found a connection with New Swiss Cinema (Neuer Schweizer Film), to which his last two films, Dällebach Kari (1970) and Der Fall (1972), belong. He died on 24 March 1979 in Boswil.

== Works ==
- Rückblenden, 1975

== Bibliography ==
- H. Dumont, Geschichte des Schweizer Films, 1987
