= Huldreich Georg Früh =

Swiss composer (1903–1945)

Huldreich Georg Früh (15 June 1903 – 25 April 1945) was a Swiss composer.
