= Oskar Wälterlin =

Swiss stage director (1895–1961)

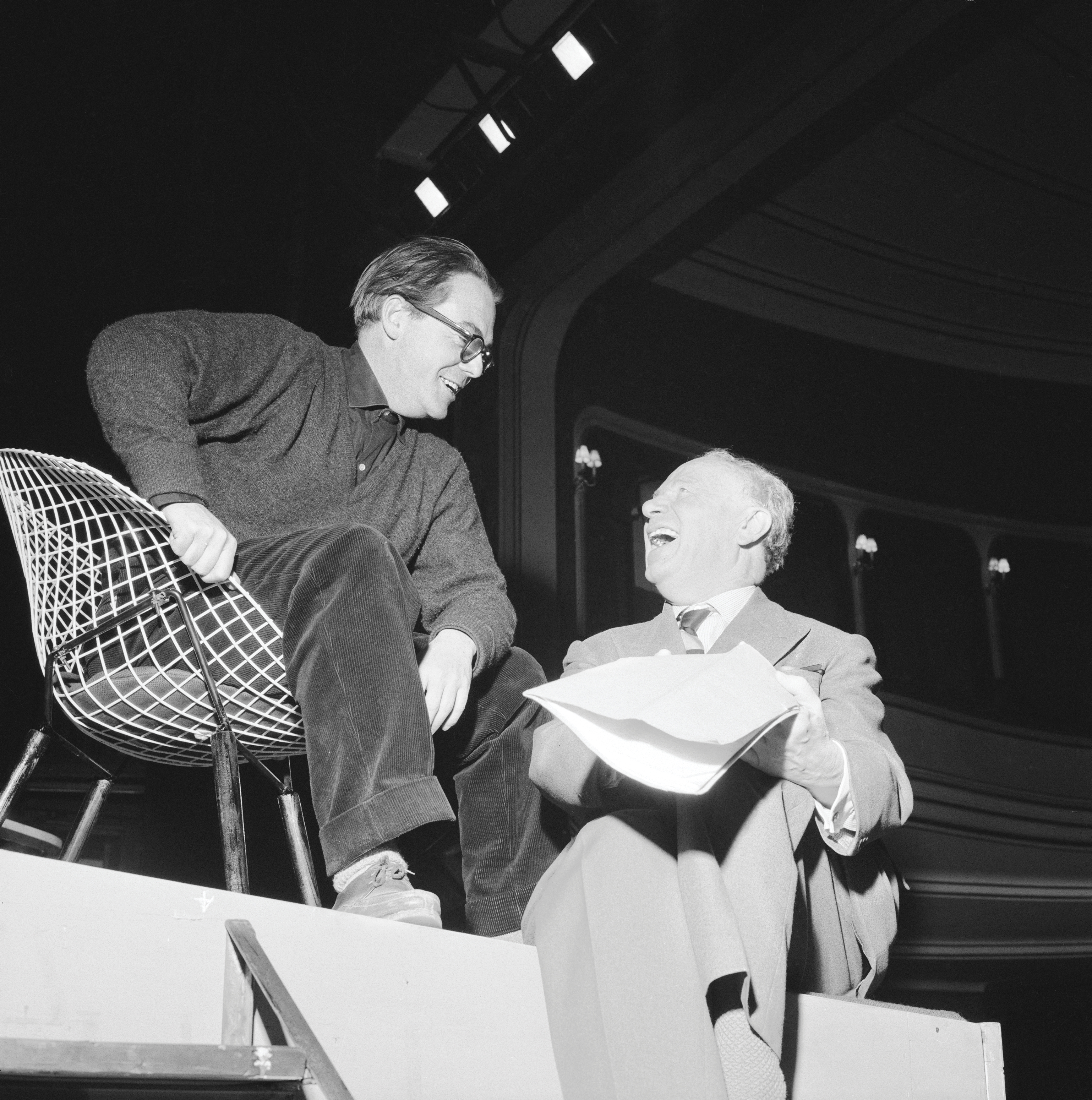
- Wälterlin (right) with Max Frisch in 1958
- Born: 30 August 1895; Basel, Switzerland
- Died: 4 April 1961 (aged 65); Hamburg, West Germany
- Education: University of Basel (PhD, 1918)
- Occupations: Stage director; theatre manager
- Parents: Leonhard Wälterlin (father); Julie Rosalie Siegrist (mother)

Oskar Wälterlin (30 August 1895 – 4 April 1961) was a Swiss stage director and theatre manager. He was director of the Stadttheater Basel from 1925 to 1932 and became director of the Schauspielhaus Zürich in 1938. During the Second World War he made the Schauspielhaus the most important German-language stage, with world premieres of works by Bertolt Brecht and others and, after 1945, by Max Frisch and Friedrich Dürrenmatt.

== Biography ==
Oskar Wälterlin was born on 30 August 1895 in Basel, the son of Leonhard Wälterlin, an insurance specialist, and Julie Rosalie Siegrist. He was unmarried. He studied German literature at the University of Basel and received his doctorate in 1918 with the dissertation Schiller und das Publikum (Schiller and the audience).

From 1919 Wälterlin worked as an actor, dramaturge and stage director at the Stadttheater Basel, which he directed from 1925 to 1932. During his time in Basel he staged about 150 operas and plays, among them Richard Wagner's operas Das Rheingold and Die Walküre in 1924–1925, in collaboration with Adolphe Appia. He resigned in 1932 after his homosexuality had been made a public scandal.

In 1933 Wälterlin became chief stage director (Oberspielleiter) at the opera house in Frankfurt am Main, which in the following years was increasingly placed at the service of Nazi cultural policy. In 1938, as part of a policy that sought to fill the management posts of municipal theatres with Swiss citizens, he became director of the Schauspielhaus Zürich. During the Second World War he made it the most important German-language stage, with world premieres of works by Bertolt Brecht and others and, after 1945, by Max Frisch and Friedrich Dürrenmatt.

Particularly before 1945, Wälterlin placed emphasis on productions of classics whose subjects allowed a link to the present in the spirit of spiritual national defence (Geistige Landesverteidigung), for example Friedrich Schiller's Wilhelm Tell with Heinrich Gretler in the title role. Altogether he staged more than 125 plays, including contemporary works such as Thornton Wilder's Eine kleine Stadt (Our Town), and the premieres of Paul Burkhard's musical comedy Der schwarze Hecht (1939) and of his own play Henri G. Dufour (1961). His film De achti Schwyzer (1939) was banned by the censors.

From 1947 to 1961 Wälterlin also directed at the Zurich Opera House. From 1932 to 1960 he was a guest director at the Stadttheater Basel, where he was director of drama (Schauspieldirektor) from 1942 to 1944, and he staged productions in Germany, Austria and France and at festivals in Basel and Zurich and, from 1946 to 1958, at the Salzburg Festival. In 1961 he was elected director of the Stadttheater Basel but was unable to take up the post. He died on 4 April 1961 in Hamburg.

== Bibliography ==
- M. P. Loeffler, Oskar Wälterlin, 1979 (with bibliography)
- H. Dumont, Histoire du cinéma suisse, 1987, 259–262
- T. Blubacher, Befreiung von der Wirklichkeit?, 1995
- F. Lendenmann (ed.), Das Schauspielhaus Zürich in der Ära Wälterlin, 1938/39–1960/61, 1995
- T. Blubacher, Oskar Wälterlin und sein Theater der Menschlichkeit, 2011 (with bibliography)

=== Archives ===
- Swiss Theatre Collection (Schweizerische Theatersammlung), Bern: partial papers (Teilnachlass)
- Basel University Library: partial papers
- Zentralbibliothek Zürich: partial papers
