= Friedrich Glauser =

Swiss writer

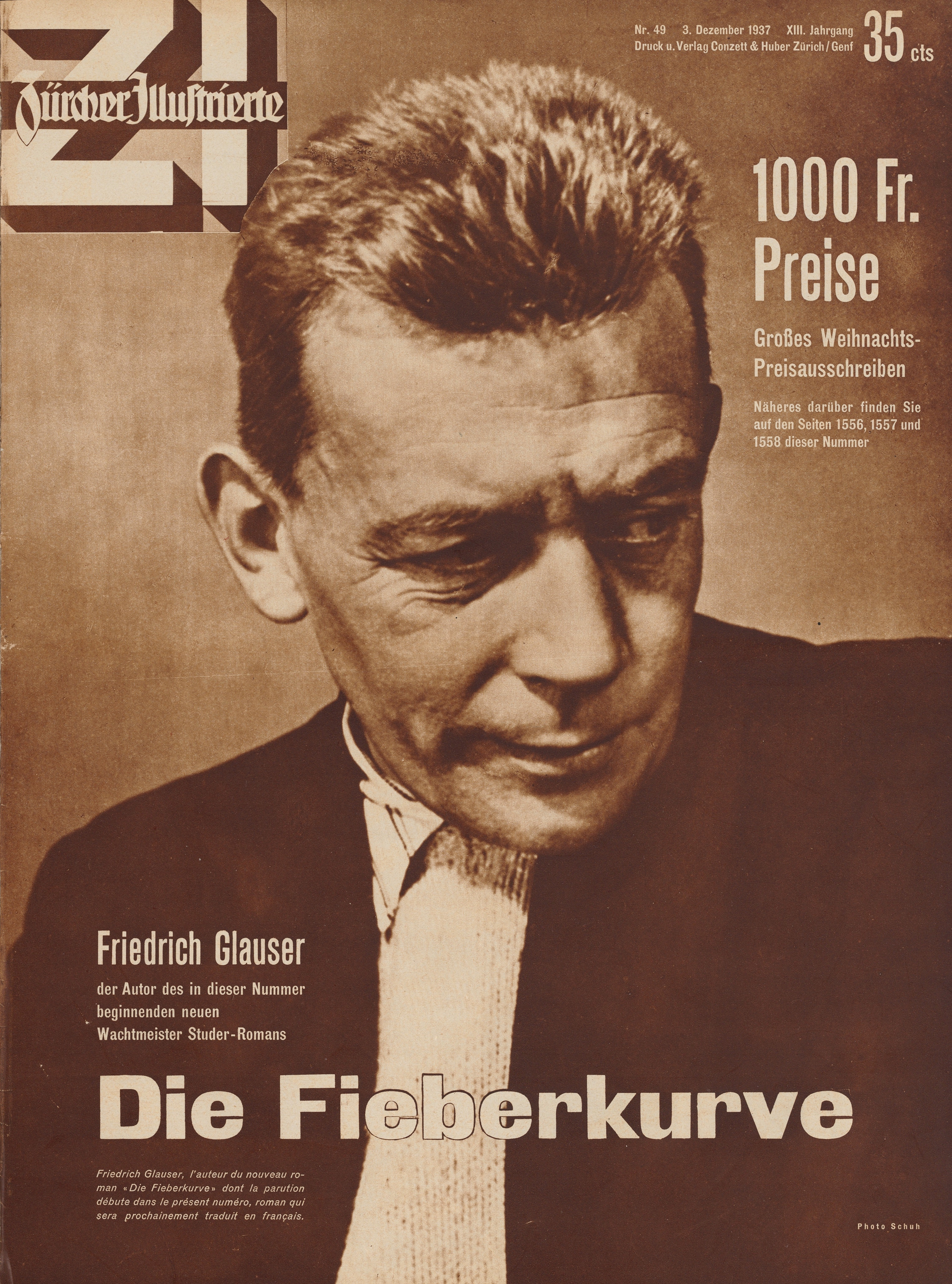
- Portrait photo of Glauser by Gotthard Schuh, Zürcher Illustrierte, vol. 13, no. 49 (December 3, 1937)
- Born: 2 April 1896; Vienna, Austria-Hungary
- Died: 8 December 1938 (aged 42); Nervi, Italy
- Resting place: Manegg cemetery, Zürich
- Occupations: novelist; poet; memoirist
- Writing career
- Language: German
- Genres: dada; detective fiction

Friedrich Glauser (4 February 1896 in Vienna – 8 December 1938 in Nervi) was a German-language Swiss writer.

== Biography ==
Glauser was a morphine and opium addict for most of his life. In his first novel Gourrama, written between 1928 and 1930, he treated his own experiences at the French Foreign Legion.

The evening before his wedding day, he suffered a stroke caused by cerebral infarction, and died two days later.

A year after his death, the 1939 film Thumbprint was released featuring Glauser's character Sergeant Studer, which became a commercial success.

Friedrich Glauser's literary estate is archived in the Swiss Literary Archives in Bern. Since 1987, the annual Glauser Prize has been one of the best-known German-language crime writing awards.

== Stories ==
The Sergeant Studer detective novels are set in the Switzerland and Europe of the 1930s, and make frequent reference to current European history, such as the Weimar Republic hyperinflation and the banking scams and scandals that marked that period. Today's readers may be surprised that no attention is given to a prominent politician of that era, Adolf Hitler.

The novels were written in standard German with a sprinkling of Helvetisms. The translations by Bitter Lemon Press make note of shifts in language register.

Jakob Studer is a sergeant in the constabulary of the Canton of Bern. He is old for his rank, having had to start over again in a new police force after being fired from his original force. The firing is mentioned in each novel as being politically motivated, because Studer refused to back off from a full investigation of a banking scandal in which he eventually caught the real criminals, well-connected top people in the banking industry, rather than making do with a few minor players. Other minor characters, notably his cheerful wife and a local attorney with whom Studer plays billiards, play small roles within the books, sometimes helping to solve the mysteries.

The Spoke opens at the wedding between Sgt. Jakob Studer's daughter and a young police constable, held at a small hotel run by an old schoolmate of Studer. Before the evening is over, another hotel guest (not a member of the wedding party) has been murdered. The unusual weapon chosen, a sharpened bicycle spoke, leads Studer and the local police to suspect the town's bicycle repairman, a gentle but mentally slow man who was severely abused during childhood.

Fever is set roughly a year after The Spoke. Sgt. Studer's daughter has just given birth to a baby boy, and Studer, on assignment in Paris, receives the news from his wife, who has gone to help the young couple with their first child. Studer goes out for celebratory drinks with several of the French gendarmerie with whom he has been working. At the pub, a rather strange White Father joins the group and tells a story of a "clairvoyant corporal" in a French Foreign Legion battalion to which the priest has been assigned who has "predicted" the murder of two Swiss women. Upon his return to Switzerland, Studer learns of the two women's deaths and begins an investigation that will take him back through France to Algeria to find the killer.

The Chinaman does not contain any clues as to where it fits within the timeline of the other stories. On 18 July (year unspecified), Studer meets an elderly retiree who has returned to the small village where he was born, near Bern, after decades spent working in various parts of Asia. The retiree tells Studer that he is sure he will be murdered very soon. Four months later, on 18 November, the retiree's prediction comes true, shortly after a seemingly unrelated, apparently natural death. After a cooperating witness is murdered, Studer must race to find the murderer before more people are killed.

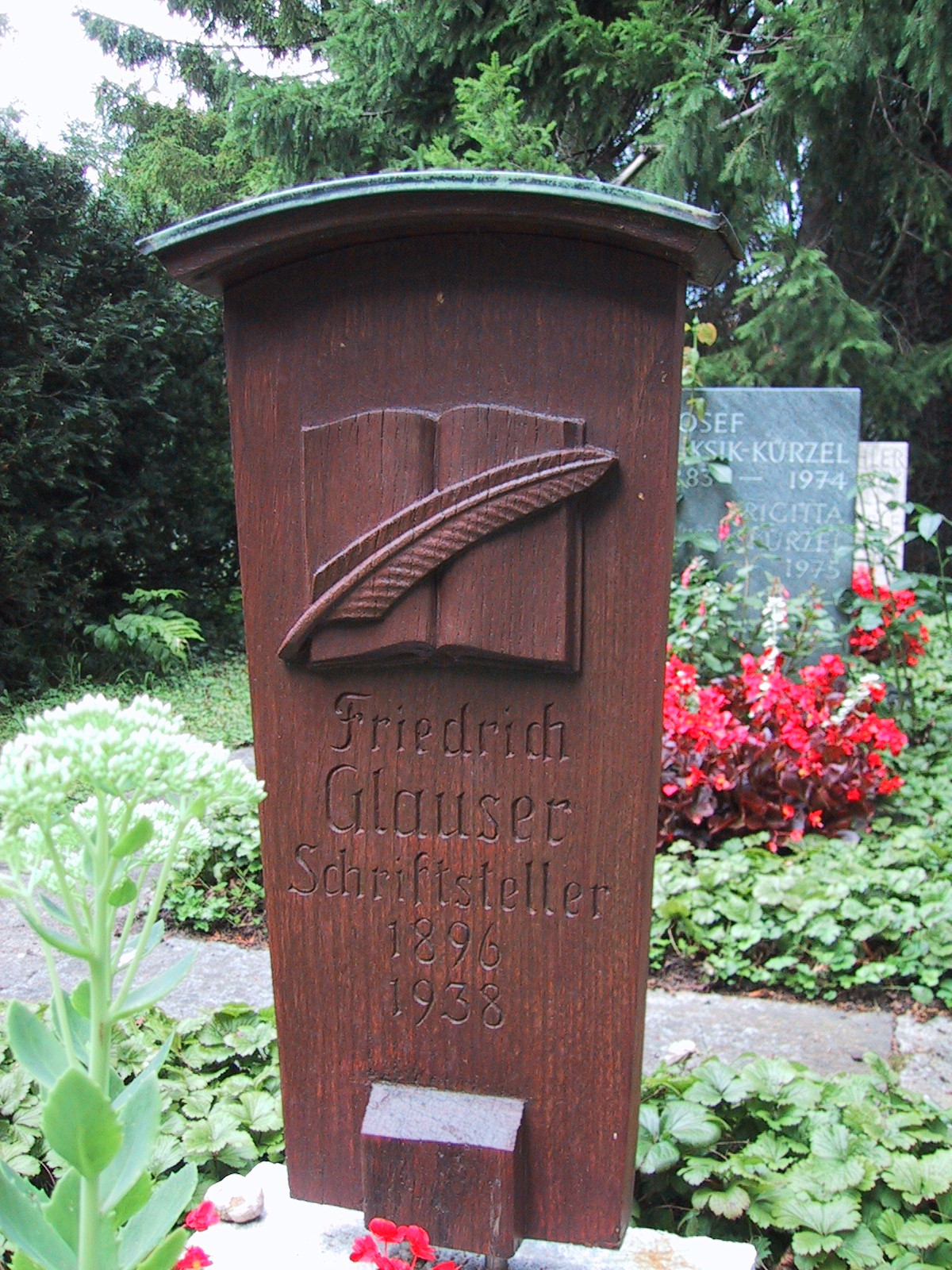
Friedrich Glauser's grave in Zurich

== Bibliography ==
- Gourrama, Zürich 1940
- Der Tee der drei alten Damen, Zürich 1940
- Beichte in der Nacht, Zürich 1945
- Dada, Ascona und andere Erinnerungen, Zürich 1976
- Morphium und autobiographische Texte, Zürich 1980
- Briefe (2 volumes, ed. Bernhard Echte), Zürich 1988/91
- Das erzählerische Werk (4 volumes, ed. Bernhard Echte), Zürich 1992–93

=== Jakob Studer mysteries ===
- Wachtmeister Studer, Zürich 1936; English translation: Thumbprint, 2004
- Matto regiert, Zürich 1936; English translation: In Matto's Realm, 2005
- Die Fieberkurve, Zürich 1938; English translation: Fever, 2006
- Der Chinese, Zürich 1939; English translation: The Chinaman, 2007
- Krock & Co. (aka Die Speiche), Zürich 1941; English translation: The Spoke, 2008

== Filmography ==
- Constable Studer, 1939
- Kriminalassistent Bloch, 1943
- Madness Rules, 1947
