= Robert Faesi =

Swiss writer and academic (1883-1972)

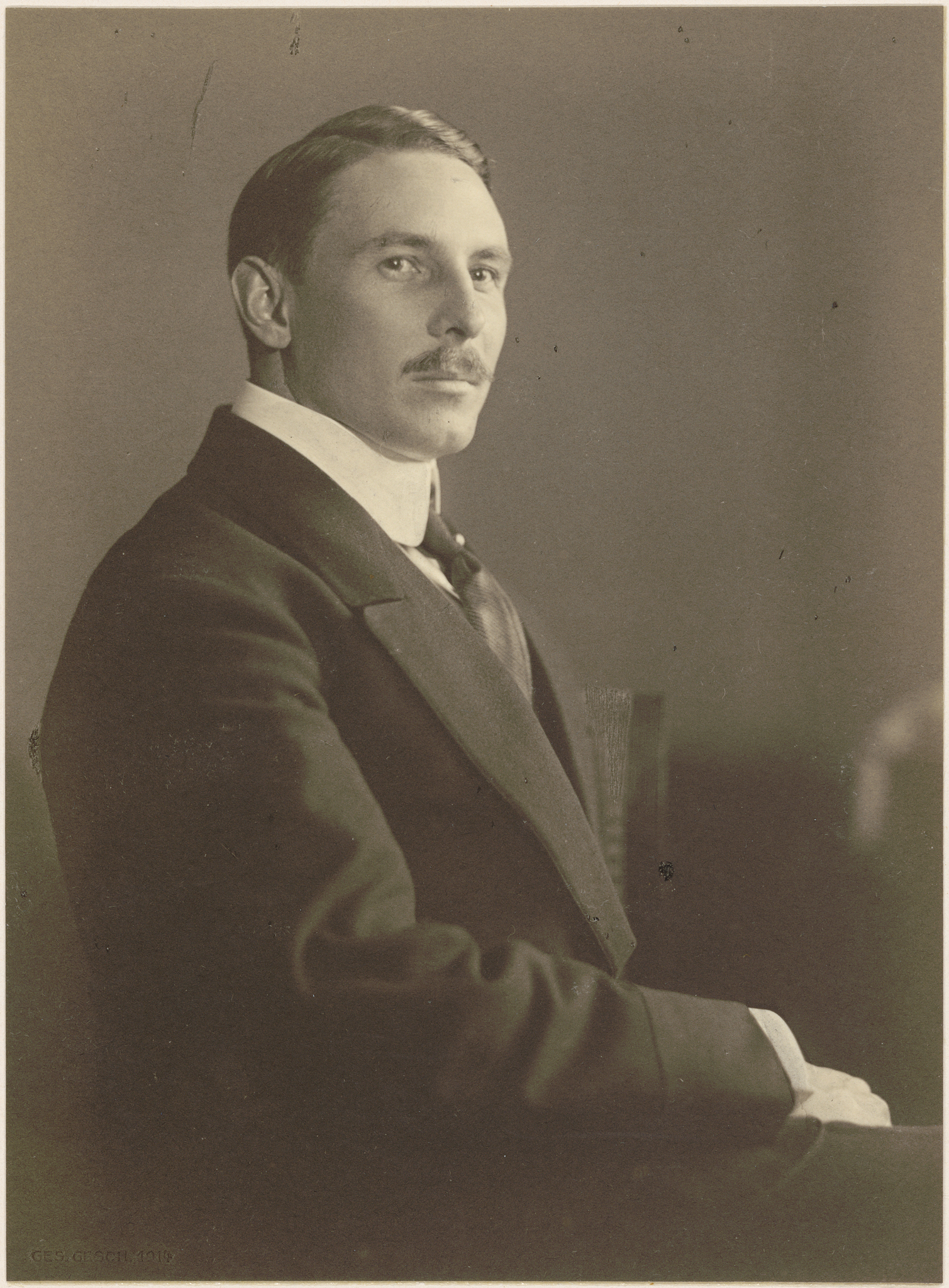
- Born: 10 April 1883 Zürich, Switzerland
- Died: 10 September 1974 (aged 91) Zollikon, Switzerland
- Occupation: Writer and academic

Robert Faesi (Swiss Standard German pronunciation: [ˈroːbɛrt ˈfɛːzi]; 10 April 1883, Zürich – 10 September 1972, Zollikon) was a Swiss writer and academic concerned with Literature and language.

== Life ==
Son of the businessman Heinrich Friedrich Faesi, Robert Faesi was born into a well established and affluent Zürich family. After successfully completing his schooling, he initially studied Law, before switching to German studies. In 1907 he obtained his doctorate with a dissertation on Abraham Emanuel Fröhlich, a nineteenth century poet-theologian. Faesi then took a position as a high school teacher in Zürich, also undertaking several extended educational tours, before ending up in 1911 at the University of Zurich where he was appointed, in 1922, "extraordinary" professor for the history of modern Swiss and German literature. Further distinctions and promotions followed at the university, and in 1953, he was nominated an emeritus professor.

From his perspective as a Germanist he wrote monographs about writers of "modern classics" such as Conrad Ferdinand Meyer, Carl Spitteler, Rainer Maria Rilke and Thomas Mann, and also chronicled a history of recent Swiss literature. With his story Fusilier Wipf which was the basis for a film that came out in 1938, Faesi also made a start on his own contribution to the more popular end of the nation's literary canon. For his Zürcher-trilogy of novels, dealing with the history of Zürich during the first half of the nineteenth century, he received the city's literary prize in 1945.

A collection of letters and other documentary material on Robert Faesi along with some memoir-material is held in the Manuscript department at the Zürich Central Library.

== Works ==
=== Prose ===
- Zürcher Idylle. Novelle. Schulthess, Zürich 1908; neu überarbeitete Fassung ebd. 1950
- Füsilier Wipf. Eine Geschichte aus dem schweizerischen Grenzdienst. Huber, Frauenfeld 1917; überarbeitete Fassung ebd. 1938
- Der König von Sainte-Pélagie. Erzählung. Haessel, Leipzig 1924
- Vom Menuett zur Marseillaise. Novelle. Grethlein, Zürich/Leipzig 1930
- Zürcher Romantrilogie:
  - Die Stadt der Väter. Atlantis, Zürich 1941; überarbeitete Fassung ebd. 1967
  - Die Stadt der Freiheit, ebd. 1944
  - Die Stadt des Friedens, ebd. 1952
- Alles Korn meinet Weizen. Roman. Atlantis, Zürich 1961
- Erlebnisse, Ergebnisse. Erinnerungen. Atlantis, Zürich 1963
- Diodor. Ohnmacht der Macht. Erzählung. Atlantis, Zürich 1968

=== Poetry ===
- Aus der Brandung. Zeitgedichte eines Schweizers. Huber, Frauenfeld 1917
- Der brennende Busch. Grethlein, Zürich/Leipzig 1926
- Das Antlitz der Erde. Insel, Leipzig 1936
- Tag unsres Volks. Eine Schweizerdichtung (= Fest-Kantate zur Landi 1939). Huber, Frauenfeld 1939
- Ungereimte Welt gereimt. Atlantis, Zürich 1946
- Über den Dächern. Bühl, Herrliberg 1946
- Die Gedichte. Atlantis, Zürich 1955

=== Drama ===
- Odysseus und Nausikaa. Tragödie in 3 Akten. Schulthess, Zürich 1911
- Die offenen Türen. Komödie in 2 Akten. Oesterheld, Berlin 1912
- Die Fassade. Lustspiel in 3 Aufzügen. Oesterheld, Berlin 1918
- Dichternöte oder Wahrhaftige Tragikomödie und grausliches Martyrium der schweizerischen Schriftsteller. Ein Kasperlispiel, mit vielem Fleiß erfunden und in Knittelverse gebracht. Schulthess, Zürich 1921
- Opferspiel. Grethlein, Zürich/Leipzig 1925
- Leerlauf. Komödie in 3 Akten. Reiss, Basel 1929
- Der Magier. Ein Spiel mit Sternen. Huber, Frauenfeld 1938
- Das Spiel von der schwarzen Spinne. Opera in 2 Acts, from the story by Jeremias Gotthelf. Bühnenmusik von Willy Burkhard. Bärenreiter, Kassel 1949; Tschudi, Glarus 1956

=== Essays and Monographs ===
- Paul Ernst und die neuklassischen Bestrebungen im Drama. Xenien, Leipzig 1913
- Das poetische Zürich. Miniaturen aus dem 18. Jahrhundert (with Eduard Korrodi). Rascher, Zürich 1913
- Carl Spitteler. Eine Darstellung seiner Persönlichkeit. Rascher, Zürich 1915
- Rainer Maria Rilke. Amalthea, Zürich/Leipzig/Wien 1919
- Gestalten und Wandlungen schweizerischer Dichtung. 10 Essays. Amalthea, Zürich/Leipzig/Wien 1922
- Conrad Ferdinand Meyer. Haessel, Leipzig 1925; überarbeitete Fassung: Huber, Frauenfeld 1948
- Heimat und Genius. Festblätter zur schweizerischen Geistesgeschichte. Huber, Frauenfeld 1933
- Spittelers Weg und Werk. Huber, Frauenfeld 1933
- Thomas Mann. Ein Meister der Erzählkunst. Atlantis, Zürich 1955

=== As an Editor ===
- Soldat und Bürger. Ein Beitrag zur nationalen Erziehung des Schweizers. Mit einem Vorwort des Generals Ulrich Wille (with Gonzague de Reynold and Charles Gos). Schulthess, Zürich 1916
- Anthologia Helvetica. Deutsche, französische, italienische, rätoromanische und lateinische Gedichte und Volkslieder. Insel Verlag, Leipzig 1921 (Reihe Bibliotheca mundi)
  - unveränderte Neuausgabe als: Die Ernte schweizerischer Lyrik. Rascher, Zürich 1928
