= Anne-Marie Blanc =

Swiss actress (1919–2009)

- Anne-Marie Blanc, c. 2008
- Born: Anne-Marie Blanc; 2 September 1919; Vevey, Switzerland
- Died: 5 February 2009 (aged 89); Zürich, Switzerland
- Spouse: Heinrich Fueter (m. 1940; died 1979)
- Children: 3

Signature
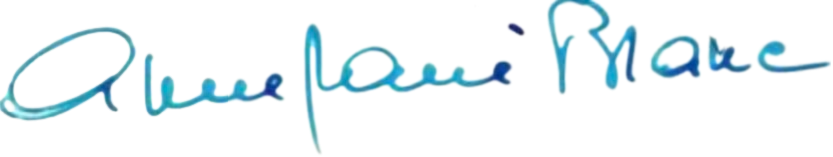

Anne-Marie Blanc (2 September 1919 – 5 February 2009) was a Swiss film and television actress, style icon and was commonly referred to as "The Grand Dame of the Swiss Film". Her granddaughter is the actress Mona Petri (née Fueter).

== Early life and education ==
Blanc was born 2 September 1919 in Vevey, Switzerland, the eldest of three children, to Louis Blanc and Valentine Blanc (née Chevalier). Her mother hailed from a privileged banking family whom married Louis who worked land registry administrator. Unfortunately, he was a violent alcoholic and she left him in 1930 with the children and moved to Bern.

== Selected filmography ==
- Constable Studer as Sonja Witschi (1939)
- Gilberte de Courgenay as Gilberte Montavon (1942)
- That's Not the Way to Die as Marianne (1946)
- White Cradle Inn as Louise (1949)
- Captive Soul as Helene (1952)
- Palace Hotel as Inhaberin des Hotels (1952)
- I'm Waiting for You as Frau Dr. Helm (1952)
- Life Begins at Seventeen as Aline Deshuges (1953)
- Spring Song as Elisabeth Lauber (1954)
- Via Mala as Frau von Richenau (1961)
- Kingdom of the Silver Lion (1965), as Marah Durimeh
- The Blonde from Peking (1967)
- Hotel Royal (1969, TV film)
- Violanta (1976)
- A Crime of Honour (a.k.a. A Song for Europe, 1985, TV film)
- Klassäzämekunft (1988)
- Lüthi und Blanc as Esther Weiss (2001–2005, TV series)

== Personal life ==
She was married to Heinrich Fueter (1911-1979), who was an attorney and executive producer. They had three sons including Peter Christian (b. 1941) and Martin Andreas (b. 1944) who led Condor Films AG, founded by their father.
