= Emil Berna =

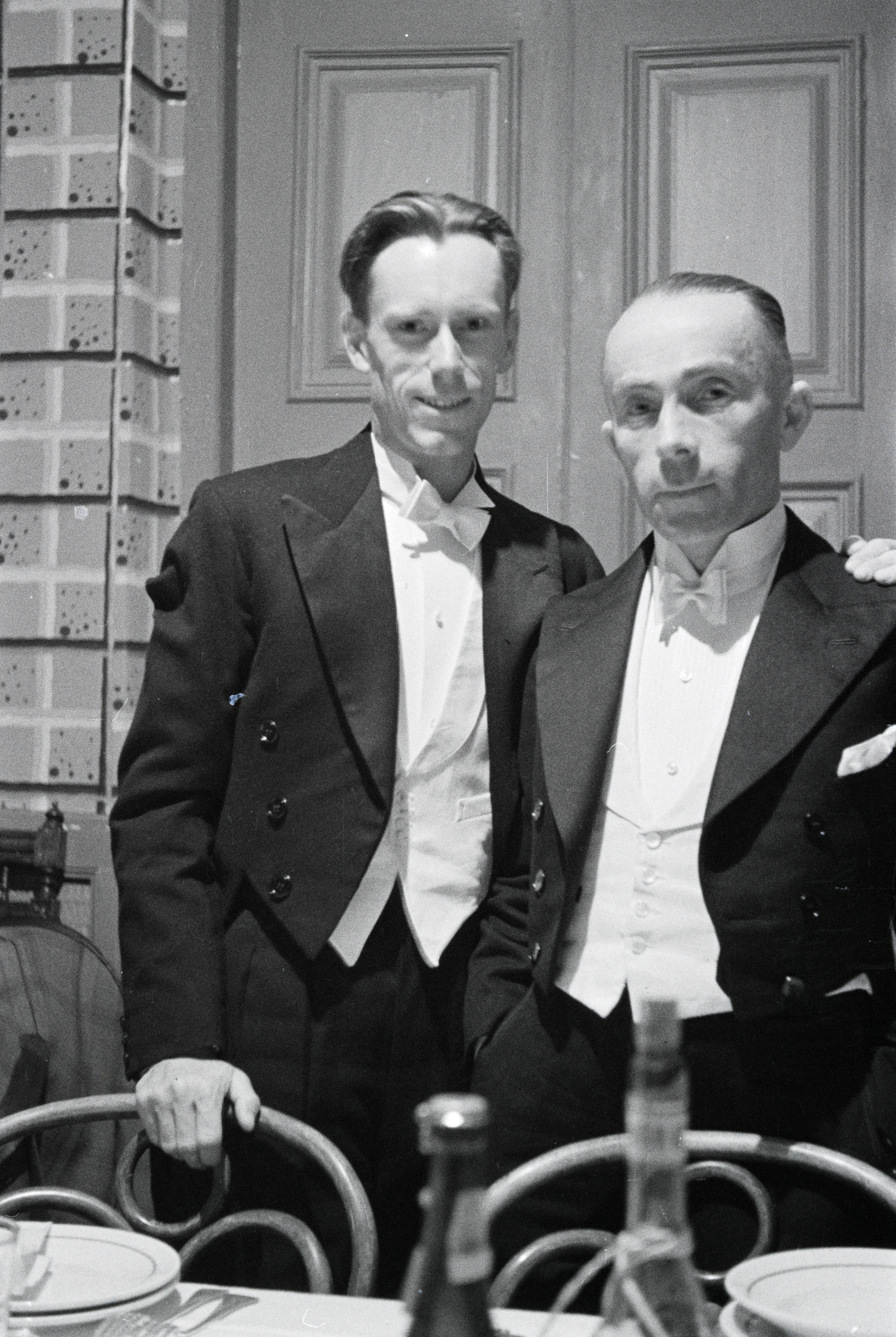
- Emil Berna (left) and Walter Mittelholzer (1934)
- Born: 2 April 1907; Zürich, Switzerland
- Died: 16 October 2000 (aged 93); Zürich, Switzerland
- Occupation: Cinematographer
- Years active: 1930–1964

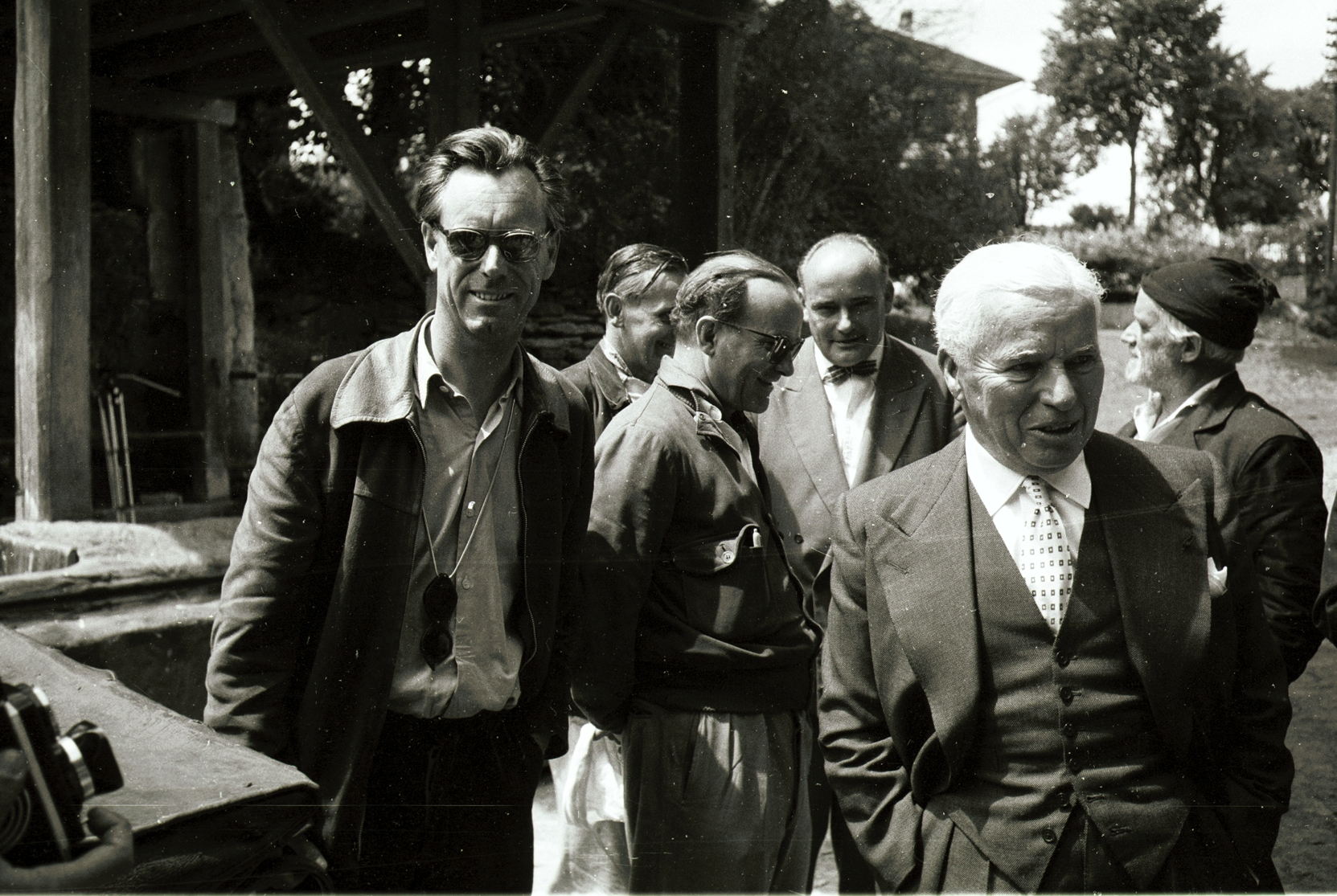
Emil Berna (left) and Charlie Chaplin (1955)

Emil Berna (2 April 1907 – 16 October 2000) was a Swiss cinematographer. He also co-directed one film, the 1952 drama Palace Hotel. For several decades Berna was employed on almost all the major Swiss film productions. He worked on the 1948 MGM film The Search which was shot on location in Europe.

== Selected filmography ==
- Feind im Blut (1931)
- Fusilier Wipf (1938)
- Constable Studer (1939)
- The Last Chance (1945)
- Madness Rules (1947)
- The Search (1948)
- Swiss Tour (1949)
- Four in a Jeep (1951)
- Heidi (1952)
- Palace Hotel (1952)
- The Village (1953)
- Heidi and Peter (1955)
- Uli the Tenant (1955)
- The Mountains Between Us (1956)
- Der Teufel hat gut lachen (1960)

== Bibliography ==
- Arthur Nolletti. The Films of Fred Zinnemann: Critical Perspectives. SUNY Press, 1999.
