= Heinrich Gretler =

Swiss actor (1897–1977)

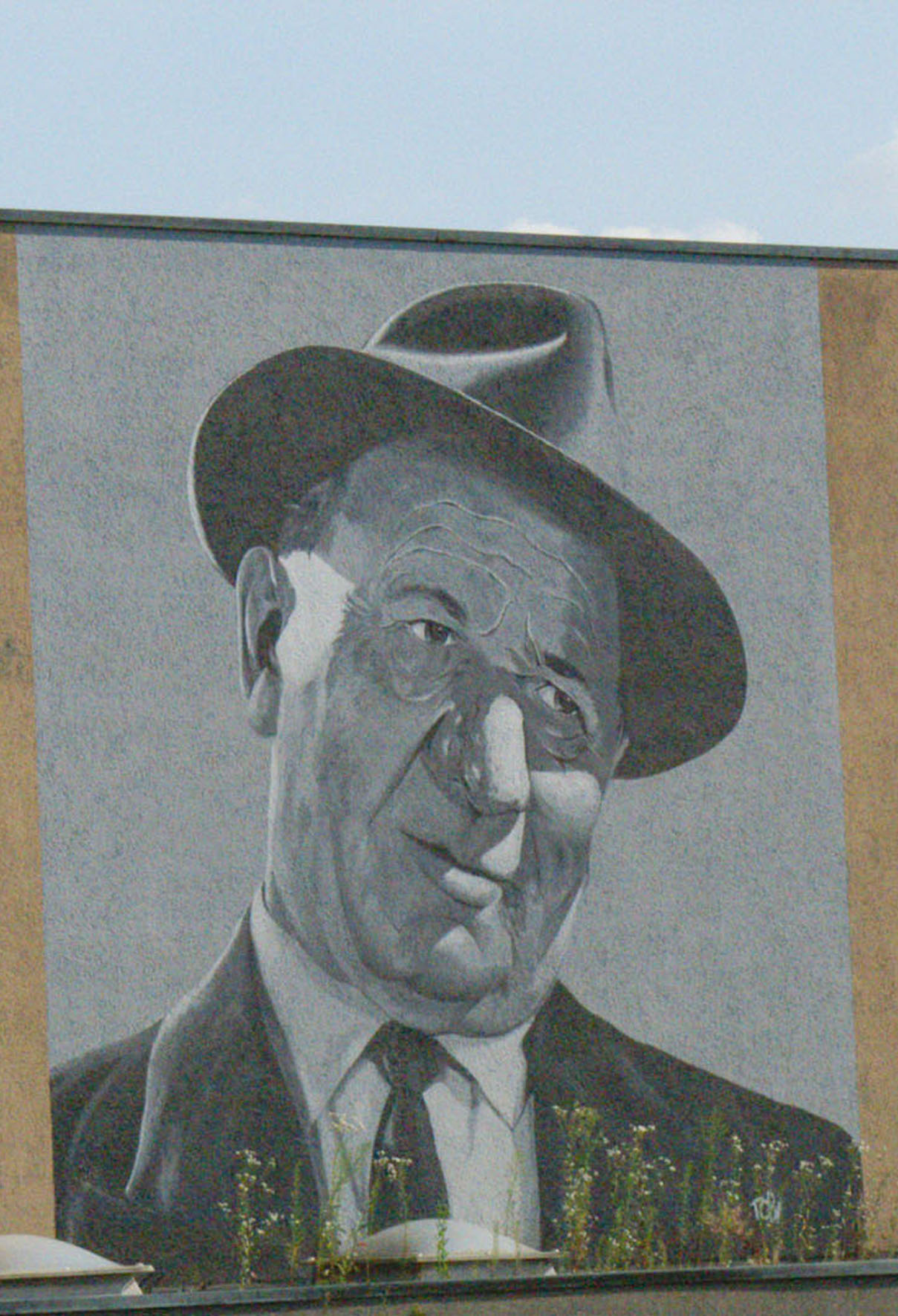
- Born: 1 October 1897; Zurich, Switzerland
- Died: 30 September 1977 (aged 79); Zurich, Switzerland
- Known for: Actor

Heinrich Gretler (1897–1977) was a Swiss film and television actor, who also starred on stage at the Bernhard-Theater in Zurich.

== Selected filmography ==
- The Mysterious Mirror (1928)
- Struggle for the Matterhorn (1928)
- The Man with the Frog (1929)
- The Last Company (1930)
- Berlin-Alexanderplatz (1931)
- Inquest (1931)
- Five from the Jazz Band (1932)
- The Tsar's Diamond (1932)
- The Empress and I (1933)
- Fusilier Wipf (1938)
- Constable Studer (1939)
- Gilberte de Courgenay (1942)
- Madness Rules (1947)
- White Gold (1949)
- Chased by the Devil (1950)
- The White Hell of Pitz Palu (1950)
- The Last Shot (1951)
- Captive Soul (1952)
- The Great Temptation (1952)
- The Exchange (1952)
- No Greater Love (1952)
- Heidi (1952)
- Nights on the Road (1952)
- The Devil Makes Three (1952)
- Your Heart Is My Homeland (1953)
- Young Heart Full of Love (1953)
- Life Begins at Seventeen (1953)
- The Venus of Tivoli (1953)
- The Village Under the Sky (1953)
- Rose-Girl Resli (1954)
- Uli the Farmhand (1954)
- The Mountains Between Us (1956)
- Spring Song (1954)
- The Fisherman from Heiligensee (1955)
- Love's Carnival (1955)
- The Priest from Kirchfeld (1955)
- Heidi and Peter (1955)
- Son Without a Home (1955)
- War of the Maidens (1957)
- The King of Bernina (1957)
- The Saint and Her Fool (1957)
- It Happened in Broad Daylight (1958)
- Ludmila (1958)
- The Cheese Factory in the Hamlet (1958)
- The Ideal Woman (1959)
- Old Heidelberg (1959)
- Heaven, Love and Twine (1960)
- Grounds for Divorce (1960)
- Via Mala (1961)
- Kohlhiesel's Daughters (1962)
- The Invisible Terror (1963)
- Keine Angst Liebling, ich pass schon auf (1970) - Hoteldirektor
- Immer die verflixten Weiber (1971) - Heiri Baer
