= Madness Rules =

1947 film

- Heinrich Gretler (left) as Constable Studer
- Directed by: Leopold Lindtberg
- Written by: Alfred Neumann; Leopold Lindtberg
- Starring: Heinrich Gretler; Heinz Woester; Irene Naef
- Cinematography: Emil Berna
- Edited by: Hermann Haller
- Production company: Praesens Film AG
- Release date: 1946
- Running time: 113 minutes
- Country: Switzerland
- Language: Swiss German

Madness Rules (German: Matto regiert) is a 1946 Swiss crime film directed by Leopold Lindtberg and based on a novel by Friedrich Glauser. It is one of Lindtberg’s Wachtmeister Studer films and was later screened at the Zurich Film Festival.

== Background ==
Madness Rules is based on Friedrich Glauser’s novel Matto regiert. Heinrich Gretler plays Wachtmeister Hermann Studer. He had previously played the character in Leopold Lindtberg’s 1939 film Constable Studer, which was adapted from a novel by Glauser.

Glauser drew on his own experience of psychiatric institutions, and the film presents both a crime story and a conflict between modern and outdated psychiatric methods.

== Synopsis ==
Wachtmeister Studer investigates a disappearance at a psychiatric clinic after a dance for the patients. The young patient Herbert Caplaun had wanted to attend, but the clinic director Ulrich Borstli refused permission, and by the next morning Borstli has vanished.

== Cast ==
The cast includes:

- Heinrich Gretler as Wachtmeister Hermann Studer
- Heinz Woester as Dr. med. Ernst Laduner
- Elisabeth Müller as Irma Wasem
- Olaf Kübler as Herbert Caplaun
- Irene Naef as Margrit Laduner
- Johannes Steiner as Dr. med. Ulrich Borstli
- Adolf Manz as Georg Caplaun
- Zarli Carigiet as Patient
- Hans Kaes as Portier Dreyer
- Mathilde Danegger as Dr. med. Spühler
- Hans Gaugler as Leibundgut
- Emil Hegetschweiler as Pfleger

== Reception ==
Writing in Geschichte des Schweizer Films (1987), Hervé Dumont described the film as visually aligned with film noir and argued that its psychological density outweighs suspense and plot. filmo described the film as a suspenseful crime story with a dense film-noir atmosphere, and wrote that while the criminal plot recedes, Lindtberg focuses on the complex network of relationships within the psychiatric clinic.

== Digitisation ==
The film was digitised in 2009 by Schweizer Fernsehen in Zurich and the Cinémathèque suisse in Lausanne.

== Festival screenings ==
The film premiered in 1946. It was later screened at the 21st Zurich Film Festival in 2025.

== Bibliography ==
- Fritsche, Maria. Homemade Men in Postwar Austrian Cinema: Nationhood, Genre and Masculinity. Berghahn Books, 2013.
