= Leopold Lindtberg =

Austrian Swiss film and theatre director

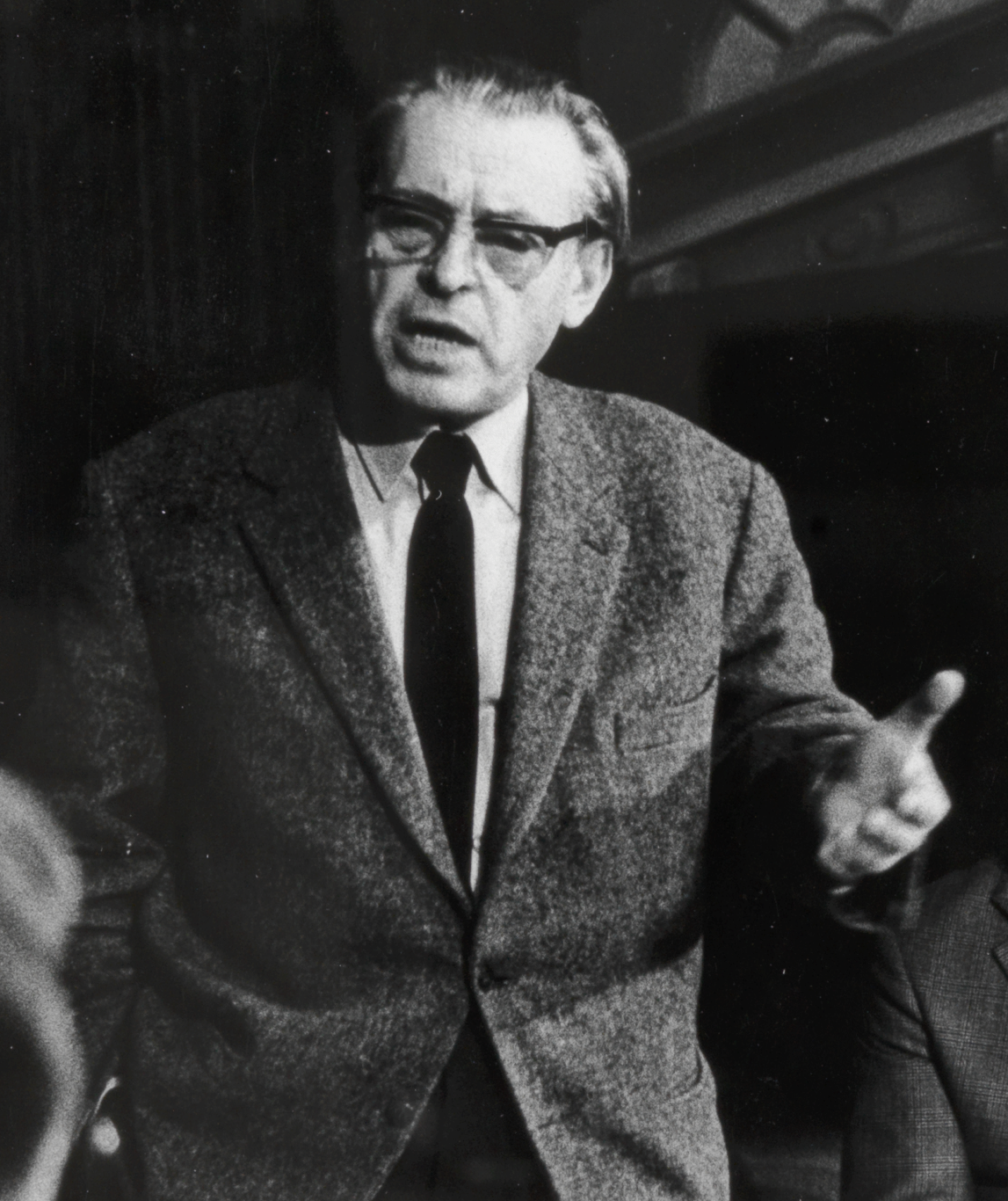
- Born: 1 June 1902; Vienna, Austria-Hungary
- Died: 18 April 1984 (aged 81); Sils im Engadin/Segl, Switzerland
- Burial place: Friedhof Enzenbühl
- Years active: 1941-1982

Leopold Lindtberg (1 June 1902 in Vienna – 18 April 1984 in Sils im Engadin/Segl) was an Austrian Swiss film and theatre director. He fled Austria due to the Machtergreifung in Germany and ultimately settled in Switzerland.

His sister Hedwig was married to the Austrian/American musicologist Felix Salzer.

== Awards ==
- 1941 Coppa Mussolini for Die Missbrauchten Liebesbriefe (The abused love letters)
- 1946 Golden Globe for The Last Chance
- 1946 International Film Festival of Cannes 1946: Grand Prix and International Peace Prize for The Last Chance
- 1951 One of four inaugural Golden Bears at the Berlinale 1951 for Four in a Jeep
- 1953 Bronze Bear for Unser Dorf (Our Village) at the Berlinale 1953
- 1953 Silver laurel of David O. Selznick Award for Unser Dorf (Our Village)
- 1956 Josef Kainz Medal
- 1958 Member of the Berlin Academy of Fine Arts
- 1958 Price of Zurich for Unser Dorf (Our Village)
- 1959 Film of the City of Zurich for Vorposten der Menschheit (Outpost of Humanity)
- 1959 appointed professor by the President of the Republic of Austria
- 1961 Golden Needle of the Schauspielhaus Zurich
- 1969 Hans Reinhart Ring
- 1974 Honorary Member of the Burgtheater
- 1976 Nestroy Ring
- 1982 Raymond Ring

== Selected filmography ==
- 1932 Wenn zwei sich streiten
- 1935 Jä-soo
- 1938 Füsilier Wipf
- 1939 Constable Studer
- 1940 Die missbrauchten Liebesbriefe
- 1941 Landammann Stauffacher
- 1944 Marie-Louise
- 1945 Die letzte Chance
- 1947 Madness Rules
- 1949 Swiss Tour (Ein Seemann ist kein Schneemann)
- 1951 Four in a Jeep
- 1953 The Village
