= Lazar Wechsler =

Swiss film producer (1896–1981)

- Liz and Lazar Wechsler (right), c. 1934
- Born: 28 June 1896; Petrokow, Russian Poland (now Piotrków Trybunalski, Poland)
- Died: 8 August 1981 (aged 85); Zurich, Switzerland
- Education: ETH Zurich
- Occupation: Film producer
- Spouse: Amalie Tschudi (m. 1919)
- Parents: Joseph Wechsler (father); Hanna Schoschka Horowitsch (mother)

Lazar Wechsler (28 June 1896 – 8 August 1981) was a Swiss film producer. In 1924 he founded Praesens Film AG in Zurich. With a team that he led autocratically, he made Praesens the most active and most representative film production company in Switzerland, successful at home and abroad for more than thirty years.

== Biography ==
Lazar Wechsler was born on 28 June 1896 in Petrokow in Russian Poland (now Piotrków Trybunalski, Poland), the son of Joseph Wechsler, a merchant, and Hanna Schoschka Horowitsch. In 1919 he married Amalie Tschudi. He became a citizen of Opfikon in 1923.

When the First World War broke out in 1914, Wechsler was in Switzerland as a holidaymaker with his wealthy mother and a brother, and at first stayed there. In 1919, he obtained a diploma in bridge engineering from ETH Zurich. In 1924, he founded Praesens Film AG in Zurich.

Long watched with suspicion by the authorities because of his Jewish Galician origins, the "film tsar" Wechsler, with a team that he led autocratically, made Praesens the most active and most representative film production company in Switzerland, successful at home and abroad for more than thirty years. He died on 8 August 1981 in Zurich.

== Bibliography ==
- W. Wider and F. Aeppli, Der Schweizer Film 1929–1964, 2 vols., 1981
- H. Dumont, Geschichte des Schweizer Films, 1987
