= Rudolf Bernhard =

Swiss comedian, radio personality, and actor

- Rudolf Bernhard in Die Venus vom Tivoli (1953)
- Born: 26 March 1901; Basel, Switzerland
- Died: 21 October 1962 (aged 61); Zürich, Switzerland
- Other name: Rudolf Bernhard Conrath
- Occupations: Theatre director, comedian, radio personality, stage, television and film actor
- Years active: 1925–1962
- Notable work: Founder of Bernhard-Theater Zürich
- Spouse: Lisa Lienbach

Rudolf Bernhard or Rudolf Bernhard Conrath (26 March 1901 – 21 October 1962) was a Swiss comedian, radio personality, and stage and film actor starring usually in Swiss German language cinema and television and stage productions. In 1941 Berhard founded the Bernhard-Theater Zürich.

== Life and work ==
Born in Basel, Canton of Basel-Stadt in Switzerland as Rudolf Bernhard Conrath, he attended Realschule and worked as an optician in his father's business, then as a canvasser of ads. He gained first stage experience at Dramatischer Verein Basel with performances as a humorist on occasion of club events and family celebrations. On 26 March 1925 Bernhard premiered as a master of ceremonies and with Berlin songs on Küchlintheater Basel. Further appearances included among many other roles Riccaut in Lessing's "Minna von Barnhelm" at the open-air theater Hertenstein in the summer of 1925, and as Malvolio in Shakespeare's Twelfth Night, then on an operetta tour in the Alsace. After his military service, Bernhard joined the Variété Corso in Zürich where he first completed office and advertising works, then he starred increasingly on solo performances in revues and also on "Cabaret Mascotte", a side stage of the Variété Corso. In 1929 Bernhard married Lisa Lienbach, a Swiss dancer and actress. Since the early 1930s Bernhard participated mainly in farces, including on tour together with Fredy Scheim. He also became popular by numerous radio appearances and radio broadcasts of "Bunte Abende" from the Bernhard-Theater, as well as various roles in Swiss and German films.

== Bernhard-Theater Zürich ==
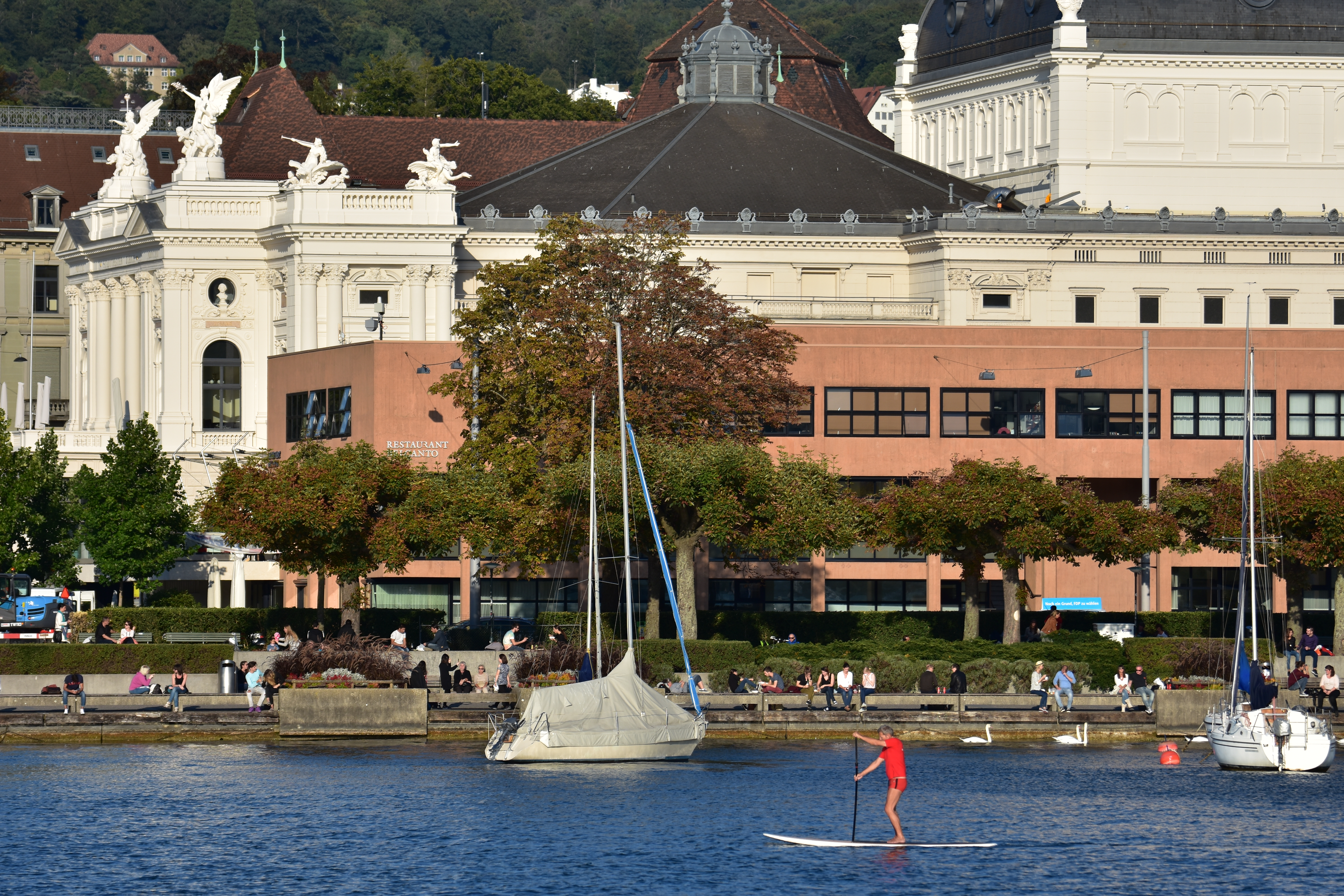
Opernhaus, Bernhard-Theater Zürich at Bellevueplatz plaza, Belcanto and Utoquai, as seen from Zürichsee-Schifffahrtsgesellschaft (ZSG) ship MS Helvetia

The popular folk actor with the distinctive elongated face, large dark eyes, the high forehead and a mouth with remarkably big teeth, founded in the Café Esplanade his own theater – the Bernhard-Theater Zürich at the present Sechseläutenplatz plaza in Zürich, which opened on 19/20 December 1941. The ensemle performed farces and comedies in the Swiss German language. The ensemble comprised among others Ernst Bölsterli, Walburga Gmür, Bernard's wife Lisa Lienbach, Peter W. Staub and Willi Stettner; as guests appeared among many others Heinrich Gretler, Emil Hegetschweiler, Alfred Rasser, Schaggi Streuli and Fredy Scheim. From the late 1940s, at the beginning of the season, the ensemble went yearly on tour in Switzerland, while the parent company held guest performances. There, 7,000 performances were played until Bernhard's surpring death in 1962, mostly farces and dialect comedies, in which Bernhard almost always played a major role, often under the direction of Albert Pulmann, from 1951 by Egon Waldmann. Bernhard's common partners were, next to his wife Lisa Lienbach, especially Pulmann, Willi Stettner and Ernst Bölsterli. Bernhard spoke his roles in the otherwise highly German farces, with a few exceptions, always in Basel German dialect.

The ensemble later included popular Swiss actresses and actors, among them Jörg Schneider, Paul Bühlmann, Inigo Gallo, Ursula Schäppi, Ruedi Walter, Margrit Rainer, Ines Torelli, Erich Vock and others, as well as the popular "Bernhard-Littéraire", and the "Bernhard-Apéro" that was re-established by Hanna Scheuring.

== Filmography (selected works) ==
Year	Title	Role	Notes
1957	Marriages Forbidden	Dekan Xaver Hindringer	
1956	S'Waisechind vo Engelberg		
1956	Die Fischerin vom Bodensee	Anton Schweizer	aka The Fisher-girl from Lake Bodensee, informal literal English title
1953	The Venus of Tivoli	Schubiger	
1950	Es liegt was in der Luft		
1943	Menschen, die vorüberziehen	Ouin-Ouin	
1941	Gilberte de Courgenay	René Max Gengenbach	
1941	Bieder der Flieger	Apotheker/Pharmacist	
1941	Der letzte Postillon vom St. Gotthard	Kondukteur Kaspar Danioth	
1940	Die mißbrauchten Liebesbriefe	Apotheker/Pharmacist	
1939	Constable Studer	Schwomm	

== Literature ==
- Walter Grieder: Gueten Oobe mitenand. 50 Jahre Bernhard-Theater. Friedrich Reinhardt, Basel 1991, ISBN 3-7245-0712-7.
