= Timeline of Zurich =

The following is a timeline of the history of the municipality of Zürich, Switzerland.

== Prehistory ==
- 4th millennium BC – Prehistoric pile dwellings Alpenquai at Bürkliplatz and Kleiner Hafner at Sechseläutenplatz on then islands or peninsulas at the outflow of the Limmat, and the Grosser Hafner island in the Lake Zurich, an area of about 0.2 square kilometres (49.42 acres).
- 4th century BC – Helvetii/ Celtic Oppidum Uetliberg
- 1st century BC – Helvetii tribe: Oppidum Zürich-Lindenhof

== 1st–8th centuries ==
- 70 CE – Roman Vicus and Gallo-Roman settlement Turicum, Thermengasse hypocaust between Weinplatz and Münsterhof
- 122 or before – Roman island sanctuary on Grosser Hafner island.
- 610 – Castellum turegum mentioned by Columban, meaning probably the Gallo-Roman-Allemanic settlement

== 9th–14th centuries ==
- 853 – Fraumünster founded.
- 857 – St. Peter church first mentioned.
- before 1200 – Pfalz on the Lindenhof hill
- 1218 – Zürich becomes free imperial city.
- 1220 – Grossmünster inaugurated (approximate date).
- 1230 – Predigerkloster founded (no foundation document).
- 1231 – Predigerkirche Zürich, construction started.
- 1237 – Oetenbach nunnery first mentioned.
- 1267 – Feud between Zürich and Rudolf I von Habsburg against the Regensberg family (1267/68).
- 1270 – Augustinerkloster Zürich established and Augustinerkirche Zürich built.
- 1273 – First mention of Jews in Zürich.
- 1280 – Grimmenturm built by the Bilgeri ministerialis (around, maybe ~1250)
- 1291 – On 28 November 1291 Countess Elisabeth von Rapperswil concluded a three-year alliance with the city of Zürich against the Dukes of Austria-Habsburg.
- 1292 – Battle nearby Winterthur, Zürich defeated, legendary siege of Zürich.
- 1336
  - Guilds in operation, some members of the previous council refuged to Johann I (Habsburg-Laufenburg).
  - Zunft zum Kämbel established.
- 1349 – Pogrom against the Jewish population of Zürich.
- 1350 – Brun opponents executed on occasion of the so-called Mordnacht, Rapperswil Castle destroyed by Brun troops, Count Johann II von Rapperswil imprisoned, Dukes of Habsburg started counterattack and forced Zürich to search for new allies.
- 1351 – Zürich joins Swiss confederation.
- 1354 – Jews resettle in Zürich.
- 1377 – Haus zum Rüden (guildhouse) first mentioned.
- 1383 – Jewish citizens allowed to renew the Synagogue and the Jewish cemetery.
- 1389 – Zunfthaus zur Haue (guildhouse) first mentioned.

== 15th century ==
- 1407 – Herrschaft Regensberg became äussere Vogtei of Zürich.
- 1423 – Jewish citizens forced to leave Zürich until 1850.
- 1437 – Elisabeth von Matsch granted the mayor and council of the city of Zürich or their representatives the authority to act on their behalf, immediately after the usurpations of lands of the Toggenburg County by the cantons of Schwyz and Glarus, and to lock Grynow.
- 1440 – Zürich expelled from Swiss confederation; Old Zürich War begins.
- 1443 – Battle of St. Jakob an der Sihl.
- 1451 – Zürich re-admitted to Swiss confederation.
- 1460 – Thurgau becomes part of city.
- 1467 – Winterthur becomes part of city.
- 1484 – Stein am Rhein becomes part of city.
- 1496 – Eglisau becomes part of city.

== 16th century ==
- 1518 – Huldrych Zwingli becomes pastor of Grossmünster.
- 1522 – Affair of the Sausages.
- 1522 – Katharina von Zimmern, last imperial abbess of Zürich, passed the Fraumünster Abbey into the possession of the city of Zürich.
- 1524
  - Reformation in Zürich
  - Augustiner and Prediger monasteries and Oetenbach nunnery in Zürich and Rüti Monastery in Rüti nearby Rapperswil disestablished.
- 1525 - Carolinum Zürich and Rütiamt established
- 1527 – Kappel Abbey disestablished.
- 1531 – Froschauer Bible published.
- 1535 - Coverdale Bible published.
- 1576 – Murerplan published.

== 17th–18th centuries ==
- 1634 – City library established.
- 1634 – Jews are forbidden from entering the city.
- 1642 – Fortifications expanded
- 1648 – City status changes from Reichsstadt to Republik.
- 1662 – Bauschänzli at Bürkliplatz built.
- 1746
  - Naturforschende Gesellschaft in Zürich (scientific society).
  - Old botanical garden established.
- 1757 – Zunfthaus zur Meisen built.
- 1770 – Orell, Gessner, Füssli & Cie in business.
- 1780 - Zürcher Zeitung (newspaper) begins publication.
- 1799
  - June – First Battle of Zurich.
  - September – Second Battle of Zurich.

== 19th century ==
- 1804 – Kantonspolizei Zürich (police) established as "Landjäger-Corps des Kantons Zürich."
- 1814 – Zürich District established.
- 1832 – Zunfthaus zur Saffran built.
- 1833 – University of Zurich founded.
- 1834 – Aktientheater built.
- 1836 - Confiserie Sprüngli in business.
- 1837
  - Staatsarchiv Zürich established.
  - Predecessor construction of Frauenbad Stadthausquai inaugurated.
- 1838 - Villa Belvoir and Münsterbrücke (bridge) built.
- 1839 – Züriputsch.
- 1847
  - Spanisch-Brötli-Bahn begins operating; Zürich Hauptbahnhof opens.
  - Bahnhofbrücke (bridge) built.
- 1850
  - Population 35,483 in city; 250,698 in canton.
  - The Jewish citizens are allowed to re-settle in Zürich (see 1423).
- 1853 – Villa Tobler built.
- 1855
  - Stock Exchange established.
  - Eidgenössische Polytechnische Schule and Zürich Oerlikon railway station open.
- 1859
  - 10 November: Peace treaty signed in Zürich.
  - Limmatquai built.
- 1860
  - Public schools established.
  - Population 44,978.
- 1862 – Israelitische Cultusgemeinde Zürich (ICZ) founded.
- 1868 - Tonhalle Orchester Zürich formed.
- 1870 – Population: 58,657.
- 1875 – Pestalozzianum founded.
- 1880 – Population: 78,345 in city; 316,074 in canton.
- 1884
  - Synagoge Zürich Löwenstrasse built.
  - Quaibrücke (bridge) built.
- 1886 – Strandbad Tiefenbrunnen opened.
- 1887 – Seeuferanlage by Arnold Bürkli, Arboretum Zürich and Bürkliplatz inaugurated.
- 1888
  - Population: 94,129.
  - Frauenbad Stadthausquai (public bath) opened.
- 1889 – Knabenschiessen begins.
- 1890 – Seebad Utoquai opened.
- 1891
  - Eduard Spelterini starts his Urania balloon.
  - Stadttheater Zürich opens.
  - Gottfried Keller Stiftung founded by Lydia Escher (1858–1891).
- 1892 – Volkstheater am Pfauen built.
- 1893
  - City expands, incorporating Wollishofen, Enge, Leimbach, Wiedikon, Wipkingen, Fluntern and Hottingen, Aussersihl, Oberstrass, Unterstrass, Riesbach and Hirslanden.
  - Rathausbrücke built.
  - August: International Socialist and Labour Congress held in Zürich.
  - Tages-Anzeiger newspaper begins publication.
- 1895 – Orthodox Jews found the Israelitische Religionsgesellschaft Zürich.
- 1896
  - Akademischer Alpen-Club Zürich (hiking club) formed.
  - Sechseläutenplatz first mentioned.
- 1898
  - Bund Schweizerischer Frauenvereine (BSF) founded.
  - Swiss National Museum opens.
- 1900 – Population: 150,703 in city; 431,036 in canton.

== 20th century ==
=== 1900s–1940s ===
- 1901 – Kriminalmuseum associated with the Kantonspolizei Zürich founded.
- 1902
  - Sechseläuten and Böögg-burning event commences.
  - Voliere Zürich established.
- 1903 – Zürichsee-Schifffahrtsgesellschaft (ZSG) founded.
- 1909 – Paddlesteamer Stadt Zürich put into commission.
- 1910
  - Kunsthaus Zürich opens.
  - Water airport Zürichhorn opens.
- 1906 - Schweizerisches Sozialarchiv founded.
- 1914
  - Zentralbibliothek Zürich (library) founded.
  - Paddlesteamer Stadt Rapperswil put into commission.
- 1915 – Mieterverband founded.
- 1916 - Cabaret Voltaire and Dada art movement founded.
- 1918 - During the Swiss General Strike, the Swiss Government responded by deploying 20,000 soldiers to Zürich.
- 1919 – Ad Astra Aero founded.
- 1920 - Population: 206,120 in city; 538,602 in canton.
- 1922
  - Kino Walche (cinema) opens.
  - Strandbad Mythenquai opened.
- 1926 – Der Schweizerische Beobachter founded.
- 1928
  - SAFFA exhibition at Saffa-Insel held.
  - Weltklasse Zürich begins.
- 1929 - Zürich Zoologischer Garten (zoo) opens.
- 1929 – Zürich hosts the sixteenth World Zionist congress.
- 1931 – Sukkulentensammlung established.
- 1937 - 2 June: Premiere of Berg's opera Lulu.
- 1937 – Zürich hosts the twentieth World Zionist congress.
- 1939
  - Hallenstadion opens.
  - Landi39 at Zürichhorn and Mythenquai
- 1941 – Bernhard-Theater Zürich founded by Rudolf Bernhard.
- 1945 – 4 March: Bombing by Allied forces.
- 1948 – Klubschule Migros founded.
- 1949 – Ex Libris (bookshop) became part the Migros group.

=== 1950s–1990s ===
- 1951 – Reederei Zürich AG established.
- 1952 – Reederei Zürich cargo liner Adele christened by Adele Duttweiler
- 1954 – Zürich 6-day race begins.
- 1956 – Besuch der alten Dame premiered at Schauspielhaus Zürich, Ruedi Walter played the blind eunuch Loby, and Paul Bühlmann the conductor.
- 1959 – Theater am Hechtplatz opened.
- 1960 - Population: 440,170 in city; 952,304 in canton.
- 1961 – Theater am Neumarkt opened.
- 1962 – Les Sauterelles founded.
- 1963 – Mahmood Mosque, Zürich built.
- 1964 – Theater an der Winkelwiese opened.
- 1966 – Sigmund Widmer elected mayor.
- 1967 – Centre Le Corbusier inaugurated.
- 1971 – Musikabteilung established.
- 1975 – Limmat Verlag founded.
- 1976 – Rotpunktverlag founded.
- 1977 – Botanical Garden of the University of Zurich opens.
- 1979 – Ursula Koch refuses to swear on 'Vaterland'
- 1980
  - May: Opernhauskrawalle, the Opernhaus youth protests known as Züri brännt meaning Zürich is burning.
  - September: Zürcher Theater Spektakel begins.
  - October: Rote Fabrik opens as a youth culture centre.
- 1981
  - WOZ Die Wochenzeitung founded.
  - Züri brännt (movie), a documentary film of 1981.
- 1984
  - Opera House renovated.
  - Theater Rigiblick opened, built in 1901 as Rigiblick restaurant and former Gastsaal venue.
- 1986 – Irchelpark opened.
- 1988 – Sozialwerke Pfarrer Sieber founded by pastor Ernst Sieber.
- 1989 – Gesellschaft zu Fraumünster founded.
- 1992 – Street Parade begins.
- 1993 – Technopark Zürich established.
- 1995 – The ETH Zurich opens a documentation centre for Jewish history in their historical archives.
- 1996 – Langstrasse festival begins.
- 2000 - Population: 363,273 in city; 1,247,906 in canton.

== 21st century ==
- 2001 – Digitec founded.
- 2003 - Sister city relationship established with San Francisco, US.
- 2005 – Zurich Film Festival and Neujahrsmarathon Zürich begin.
- 2005 – The Jewish religious communities are recognised as legal entities in the canton of Zürich.
- 2008 – SIX Group formed.
- 2009
  - Corine Mauch elected mayor.
  - Uetliberg Tunnel opens on the A3 motorway in vicinity of city.

== See also ==
- List of mayors of Zürich
- List of cultural property of national significance in Switzerland: Zürich
- Timelines of other municipalities in Switzerland: Basel, Bern, Geneva

== Bibliography ==
=== in English ===
- Monsieur de Blainville (1757), "Zurich", Travels through Holland, Germany, Switzerland, but especially Italy, Translated by Turnbull, London: John Noon
- David Brewster, ed. (1832). "Zurich". Edinburgh Encyclopædia. Philadelphia: Joseph and Edward Parker. hdl:2027/uc2.ark:/13960/t3dz0hq2k.
- Francis Coghlan (1839). "Zurich". Guide through Switzerland and Chamounix. London: A.H. Baily and Co.
- Coolidge, William Augustus Brevoort (1910). "Zürich (town)" . Encyclopædia Britannica. Vol. 28 (11th ed.). pp. 1057–1060.
- "Zurich and the Uetliberg". Switzerland. Coblenz: Karl Baedeker. 1863.
- C.B. Black (1876), "Zurich", Guide to Switzerland and the Italian Lakes, Edinburgh: Adam and Charles Black
- George Henry Townsend (1877), "Zurich", Manual of Dates (5th ed.), London: Frederick Warne & Co., hdl:2027/wu.89097349427
- W. Pembroke Fetridge (1878), "Zurich", Harper's Hand-Book for Travellers in Europe and the East, New York: Harper & Brothers
- Zurich and its Environs, Illustrated Europe, Zürich: Orell Füssli & Co., 1880
- Benjamin Vincent (1910), "Zurich", Haydn's Dictionary of Dates (25th ed.), London: Ward, Lock & Co., hdl:2027/loc.ark:/13960/t89g6g776 – via HathiTrust
- "Zurich". Switzerland. Grieben's Guide Books (2nd ed.). Berlin: Albert Goldschmidt. 1912. hdl:2027/uc1.$b264107.
- "Zurich", Switzerland (26th ed.), Leipzig: Karl Baedeker, 1922, OCLC 4248970

=== in German ===
- Salomon Vögelin (ed.). Das alte Zürich (in German). Zürich: Füssli & Co. 1878-1890
- Andres Kristol (2005), "Zürich ZH (Zürich)", Dictionnaire toponymique des communes suisses – Lexikon der schweizerischen Gemeindenamen – Dizionario toponomastico dei comuni svizzeri, Frauenfeld/Stuttgart/Wien: Centre de dialectologie, Université de Neuchâtel, Verlag Huber, ISBN 3-7193-1308-5 and Éditions Payot, Lausanne 2005, ISBN 2-601-03336-3.
