= Ursula Schaeppi =

Swiss comedian and actress

- Born: 22 June 1940 (age 85); Zürich, Canton of Zürich, Switzerland
- Other name: Ursula Schäppi
- Occupations: Stage, television and film actress, playwright, comedian, radio personality
- Years active: since 1958
- Spouse: Rudolf Haas
- Awards: Ursula Schäppi#Awards

Ursula Schaeppi or Ursula Schäppi (born 22 June 1940) is a Swiss comedian, radio personality, and stage, voice and film actress starring usually in Swiss German language stage productions and as voice actress in children's literature.

== Early life and education ==
Born and raised in Zürich, Canton of Zürich in Switzerland, Ursula Schäppi began acting at the conservatory in Bern at Margarethe Schell von Noé in 1955, and in 1956/58 took lessons with Walter Fried on Bühnenstudio Zürich, and private lessons with Richard Münch. During her training, Schaeppi premiered on stage, and played among others Gisèle in Giraudoux's "Intermezzo" on Schauspielhaus Zürich in 1955.

== Theater, playwright and children's literature and plays ==
In 1958 Schaeppi was engaged at the Studio 20 in Bern as Laura in Williams' The Glass Menagerie. From 1959 she worked at German city theatres, among other things, in Castrop-Rauxel, Berlin, München and in Rendsburg. At this time also began Schaeppi's career with children and trouser roles that later became one of her trademarks, including the title role in Saint-Exupéry's The Little Prince. In 1968/69 she toured with the Deutsche Kammerspiele Buenos Aires through South and Central America, and received an engagement at Berliner Kammerspiele stages in 1971/72. Since 1969 she appeared in guest roles at Swiss theaters, for example, in 1969 at the Stadttheater Bern as Effie in Ludwig Thomas' "Moral", and in 1970 at the gallery theater Die Rampe in Bern as Mingo in the premiere of Alexander Ziegler's "Zellengeflüster". In 1976 she starred in the title role of Hansjörg Schneider's "Sennentuntschi" that was directed by Schneider.

It was followed by appearances at the Stadttheater Luzern, Kleintheater Kramgasse 6 in Bern and at the Stadttheater Chur, and since the early 1970s, also first appearances in the Swiss German dialect theater. Her breakthrough celebrated Ursula Schäppi in 1975, at Bernhard-Theater Zürich as Heideli in the premiere of Max Rüeger's "Hochzeit in Hägglingen", under the direction of Inigo Gallo, followed by regular appearances in the Bernhard-Theater, at first mainly in cabaret revues by Charles Lewinsky, Fredy Lienhard and Hans Gmür, later in Swiss dialect versions of boulevard plays, for example, in 1988 in the title role of Jack Popplewell's successful play "Katharina die Kühne" and Swiss tour performances and television broadcasting. Moreover, Schaeppi created her own arrangements for Swiss productions of the Bernhard Theater where she also performed in leading roles. There, also the long-standing collaboration with Rudolf Haas and Franco Romano began. She had further guest appearances at other theaters, for example, in 1979 as Oma Zeitel in Jerry Bock's musical "Anatevka" and in 1982 as Toinette in Molière's The Imaginary Invalid on Atelier Theater in Bern.

National merits gained Ursula Schäppi since 1977 through her appearances on Swiss television as Goof or Göre Ursula (cheeky girl) in Kurt Felix' "Teleboy", by her television show 10 x Schaeppi and as Eva Chifler in "Traumpaar" with Walter Andreas Müller when even a song was listed in the Swiss radio charts. Starting in 1987, Schaeppi produced independent theater productions with Haas, Romano and Müller, in which she also starred and for which she often wrote the Swiss dialect versions, including in 1987 the Swiss premiere of Pierre Chesnot's "Vier linke Hände" with Müller and directed by Haas, in 1991 as "Käthi - Superstar", and in 1994 the dialect version of "Die Sternstunde der Hanna Bieder", which on Gastspieltheater Zürich was resumed in 2000. In 1990, she starred in a dual role as Lisbethli and her mother the infomercial Rotsch. A great success was "Stan und Ollie in der Schweiz", starring Schaeppi as Stan and Stephanie Glaser as Ollie. Her productions staged for several years guest performances, among others at the Bernhard-Theater, on Theater am Hechtplatz, and on the studio stage of the Opernhaus Zürich, at the Atelier-Theater in Bern and at the Sommertheater Winterthur. After a long pause Schaeppi published other theater directing credits and Swiss dialect edits: in 1998 "Tatort: Goldküste!" according to Popplewell, and in 2001 the Swiss premiere of Jack Jacquin's "Der Mord zum Sonntag" on Gastspieltheater Zürich where Schaeppi starred in the lead role.

Ursula Schäppi wrote and spoke children's stories and fairy tales, which are available as audiobooks. She also became popular by numerous radio appearances. Beside the stage, she became popular, along with Jörg Schneider, Paul Bühlmann and Ines Torelli, by fairytale-radio plays records.

After many years absence from the stage, in 2012 she toured again in her signature role as Requisiteuse. Ursula Schaeppi founded the children's theater studio in the municipality of Thalwil on Zürichsee lake shore. Celebrating her 75th anniversary, Ursula Schaeppi announced to focus finally, at the request of a group of seniors, increasingly on theater productions with their peers because "many of the existing plays are just too dull".

== Personal life ==
Ursula Schaeppi is a citizen of the municipality of Thalwil in the Canton of Zürich. Schaeppi was married with Rudolf Haas, a Swiss and actor with whom she also toured. In 1998 on Swiss television SRF Schaeppi talked about her depression to which she suffered after seven friends died within a short period; it was accompanied by a career slump, and she stepped back public appearance. She also suffers of chronic lymphoid leukaemia which did not to allow to stage again on Bernhard-Theater Zürich in "Sie spillt wieder mit öis. Aber nume no eimal!".

== Filmography ==
- 1990: Rotsch
- 1973: Ein Fall für Männdli (Television series, 1 episode)

== Awards ==
- 2013: Ehren-Prix Walo for her lifetime work.
- 1989: Prix Bernhard by Bernhard-Theater Zürich
- 1987: Prix Walo Publikumsliebling together with Walter Andreas Müller
