= Theater am Hechtplatz =

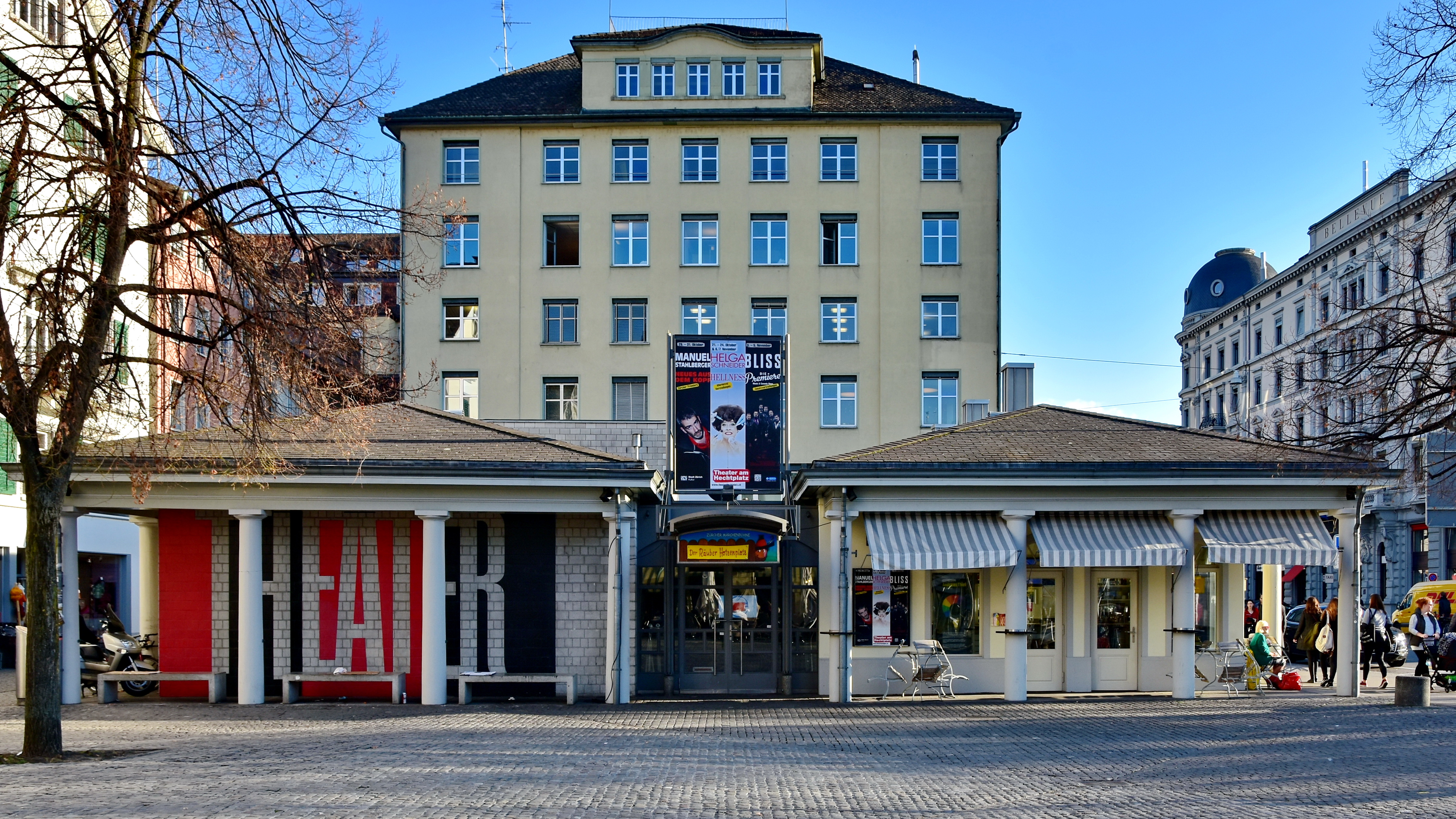
- The theater building at Hechtplatz square respectively Limmatquai in Zürich
- Interactive map of the Theater am Hechtplatz area

General information
- Status: active
- Type: Theatre
- Location: Limmatquai Zürich, Switzerland, Hechtplatz 7, CH-8001 Zürich
- Coordinates: 47°22′5.9″N 8°32′41.3″E
- Completed: 1835
- Renovated: 1958/59 and 1987
- Owner: Stadt Zürich
- Landlord: City of Zürich

Technical details
- Floor count: 1

Design and construction
- Architects: Leonhard Zeugherr (1835); Ernst Gisel (1958/59); Martin Spühler (1987)

Other information
- Seating capacity: 260

Website
- Official website (in German)

The Theater am Hechtplatz is a theatre in the German-speaking Switzerland situated at Limmatquai in Zürich. Founded in 1959 as a Cabaret, it's owned and provided by the government of the city of Zürich.

== History ==
To give a solid performance venue to the Swiss cabaret, Theater am Hechtplatz was founded on the initiative of Dionysius Gurny, secretary of Emil Landolt, then the mayor of the city of Zürich. On 25 April 1959 the opening took place with the program "Eusi chliini city" by the Cabaret Fédéral. The city loaned the theater to Otto Weissert, director of the Cabaret Fédéral, under the preserve that it had to serve temporarily as a second stage of Schauspielhaus Zürich. Schauspielhaus soon suspended for financial reasons, the Cabaret Fédéral was resolved, and Weissert was appointed as director of Schauspielhaus. In 1961 the operation of the theater was therefore associated to a department of the Zürich mayor's office, the present Präsidialdepartement; since 1971 the theater is subsidized by the city of Zürich.

Headed by Gurny, Felix Rogner, Rudolf Sauser, Nicolas Baerlocher and Dominik Flaschka, the theater became one of the main stages for cabaret in Switzerland. In guest performances of varying length, it shows mainly domestic, but also cabaret of artists from outside of Switzerland, among others by Alfred Rasser, César Keiser and Margrit Läubli, Franz Hohler, Georg Kreisler, Kaspar Fischer, Joachim Rittmeyer, and Lorenz Keiser. Chanson, folklore, pantomime and clowns, as Dmitri and Gardi Hutter and puppet theater. A second program focus form – often as equity or co-productions – musicals, and comedies by Swiss authors, among them Ursula Schaeppi, Jörg Schneider, Hans Gmür and Peter Zeindler, with popular Swiss actresses and actors, such as Ruedi Walter, Walter Roderer, Ines Torelli, Stephanie Glaser and Anne-Marie Blanc. Children's shows such as guest performances by the Zürcher Märchenbühne, literary matinees and jazz concerts, are also part of the small theater's program.

== Facilities ==
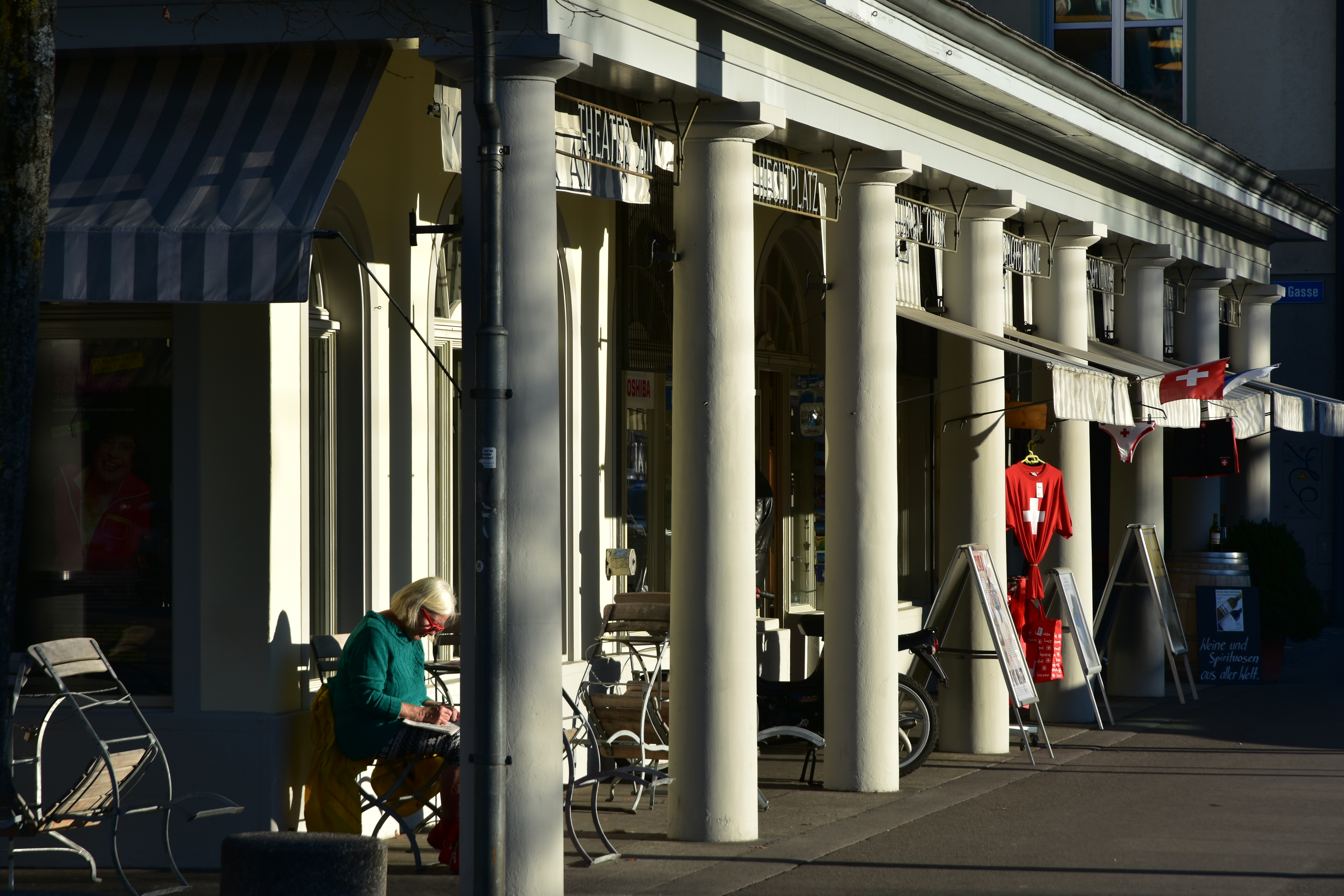
Limmatquai

The theater is located at the small Hechtplatz square on the upper Limmatquai, opposite of the Bauschänzli respectively Frauenbad Stadthausquai, near the present Bellevueplatz in Zürich. It was built by Leohnard Zeugherr as a one-story commercial building to house shops and small business in 1835, later it was used as a fire station at the Limmatquai. In 1958/59 it was rebuilt by Ernst Gisel in a theatre with adjacent café/bar, since 1981 the theater is a listed building. Its exterior was renewed and the foyer was rebuilt by Martin Spühler in 1987. The theater houses a proscenium stage (7m x 3,6m/5.8m x 4.8m) with an auditorium that haves a seating capacity of up to 260 spectators.

At the beginning of 2025, the Zürcher Stadtrat decided to finance a complete renovation of the building during the year 2026. The renovation will encompass a complete renewal of the building technique, a thorough refurbishing of the spectators venue and an adaptation to the legal regulations regarding accessibility. During the renovation, the company will perform in the community center of the evangelical church in Zurich Seefeld.

== Zürcher Märchenbühne ==
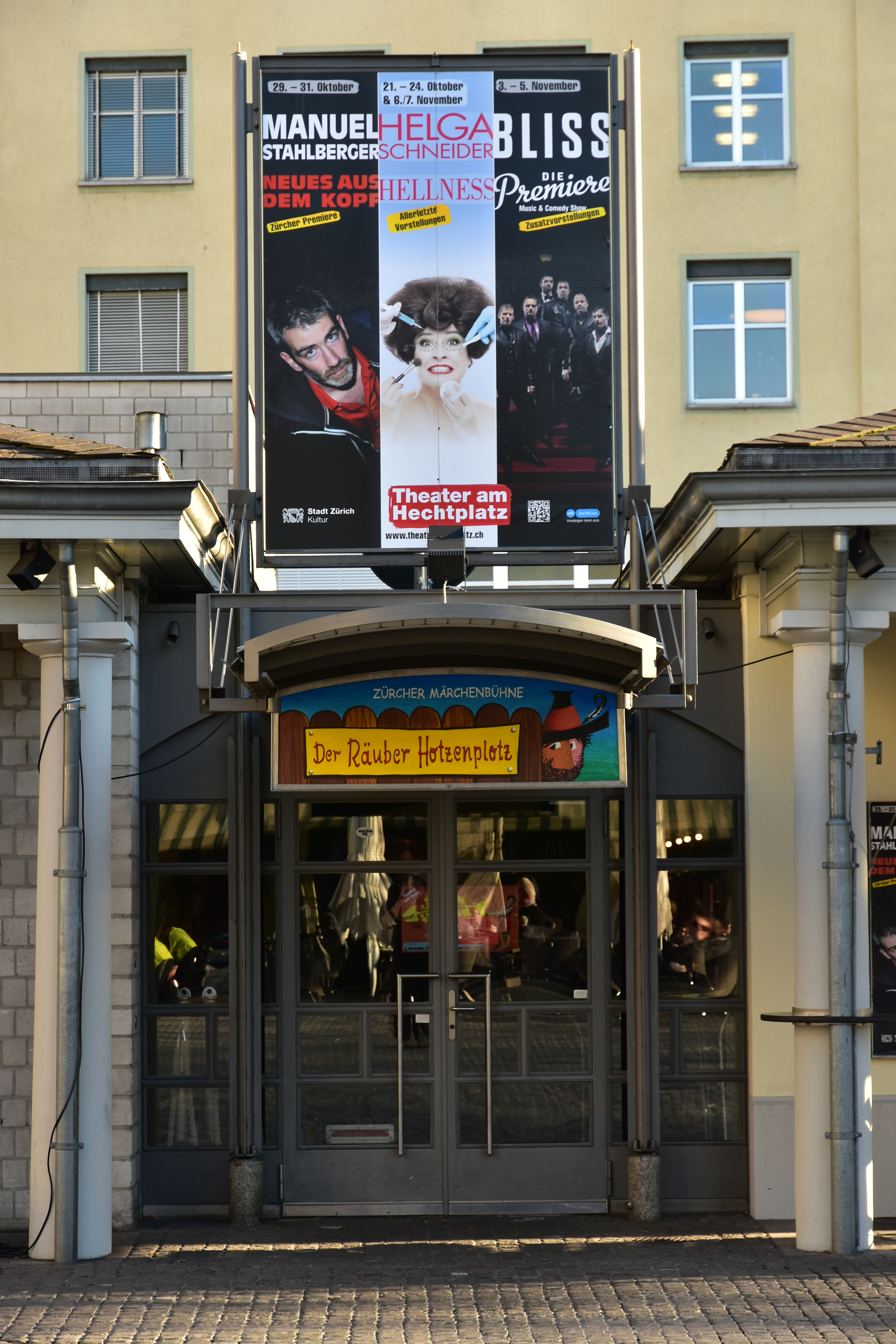
Zürcher Märchenbühne

As well as the Bernhard-Theater in 1961/63, it also houses the Zürcher Märchenbühne which annually produces a fairy tale for children during the winter months, starring among others Vincenzo Biagi, Paul Bühlmann, Inigo Gallo, Walter Andreas Müller, Bella Neri, Margrit Rainer, Jörg Schneider, Peter W. Staub, Schaggi Streuli, Ines Torelli, Erich Vock and Ruedi Walter.

== Directors ==
- 1959 – 1961: Otto Weissert
- 1961 – 1963: Dionysius Durni
- 1963 – 1965: Felig Rogner
- 1967 – 1971: Dionysius Durni
- 1971 – 1974: Rudolf Sauser
- 1974 – 2002: Nicolas Bärlocher
- since 2002: Dominik Flaschka

== Cultural heritage ==
The theatre respectively building is listed in the Swiss inventory of cultural property of national and regional significance as a Class B object of regional importance.

== Literature ==
- Nicolas Baerlocher and Dominik Flaschka (publisher): Jetzt erst Hecht: 50 Jahre Theater am Hechtplatz. NZZ Libro, Zürich 2009, ISBN 3-7245-0712-7.
