= The Venus of Tivoli =

1953 film

- West German poster
- Directed by: Leonard Steckel
- Written by: Peter Haggenmacher (play); Leonard Steckel; Friedrich Torberg
- Produced by: Oscar Düby
- Starring: Hilde Krahl; Paul Hubschmid; Heinrich Gretler
- Cinematography: Eugen Schüfftan
- Edited by: René Martinet
- Music by: Walter Baumgartner
- Production company: Gloriafilm
- Distributed by: Rex Filmverleih
- Release date: 4 April 1953
- Running time: 95 minutes
- Country: Switzerland
- Language: German

The Venus of Tivoli (German: Die Venus vom Tivoli) is a 1953 Swiss comedy drama film directed by Leonard Steckel and starring Hilde Krahl, Paul Hubschmid and Heinrich Gretler. It was shot at the Bellerive and Rosenhof Studios in Zürich and on location around Chur and Schaffhausen. The film's sets were designed by the art director Werner Schlichting.

== Synopsis ==
Former actress Anina Wiedt and a struggling impresario meet at the Zürich consulate of a South American country. In order to secure visas they need to demonstrate their ability to find work. They team up to stage performances of his acting troupe, but after the first show he absconds with the proceeds. Anina takes over the management of the group, but in order to settle the debts the troupe has incurred, she has to work under the supervision of a cantankerous bailiff and his young and more amiable assistant, Bölsterli.

== Cast ==
- Hilde Krahl as Anina Wiedt
- Paul Hubschmid as Bölsterli
- Heinrich Gretler as Knüsli
- Gustav Knuth as Hermann Schninkat
- Inge Konradi as Manci Sipos
- Walter Richter as Osvaldo Curtis
- Rudolf Rhomberg as Leopold Gerzner
- Peer Schmidt as Erich Kube
- Ilka Grüning as Frau Stransky
- Heinrich Trimbur as Konsul
- Rudolf Bernhard as Schubiger
- Ruedi Walter as Hunziker
- Fredy Scheim as Benziger
- Walburga Gmür as Wirtin
- Anja Steckel as Sekretärin
- Marianne Kober as Serviertochter
- Rene Magron as Vorhangzieher
- Walter Roderer as Zimmerli
