= Bernhard-Theater Zürich =

Theatre in Zurich, Switzerland

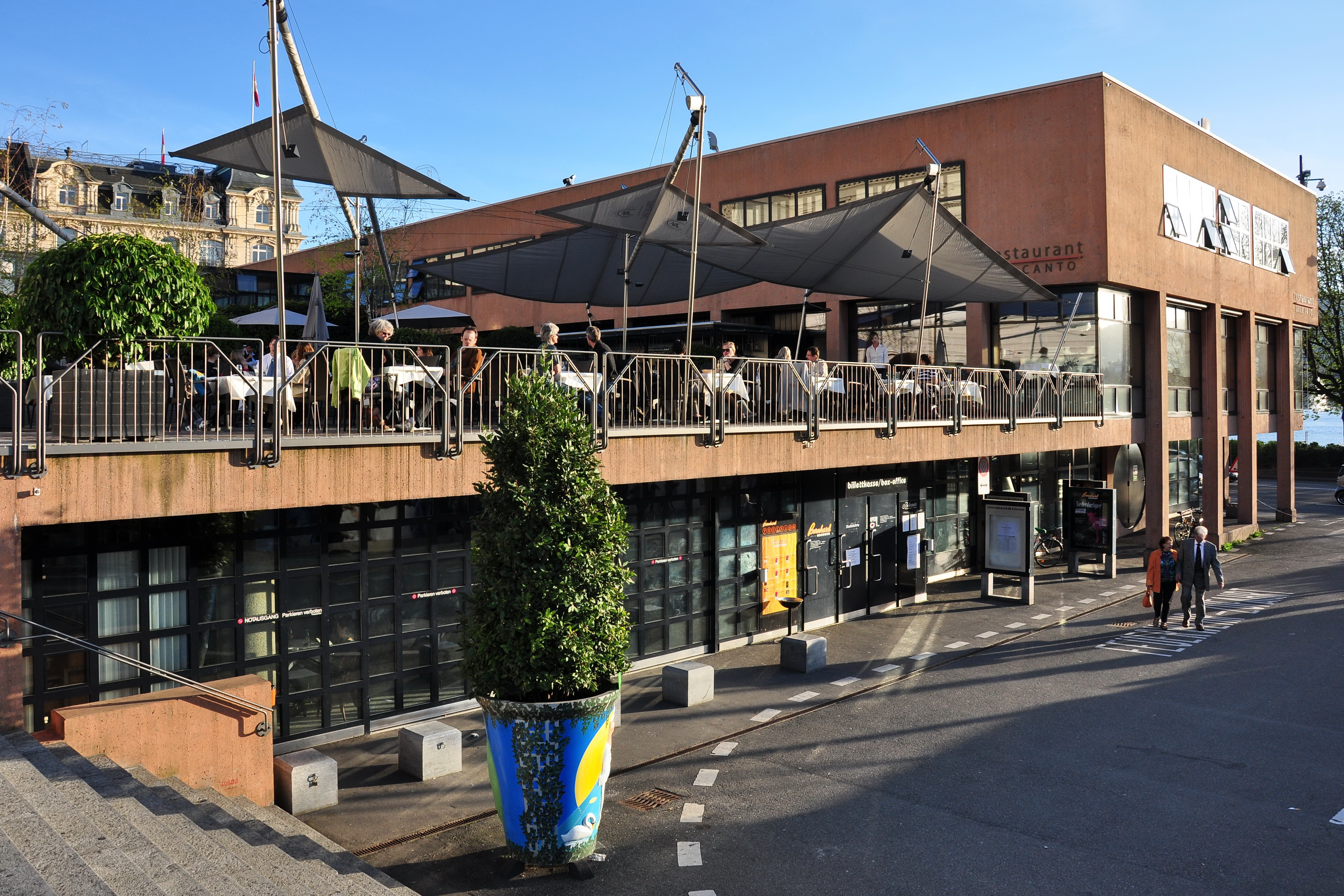
- The theater building at Sechseläutenplatz respectively Utoquai in Zürich
- Interactive map of the Bernhard-Theater Zürich area
- Former names: Rudolf-Bernhard-Theater
- Alternative names: Bernhard Theater; Komödie am Bellevue

General information
- Status: active
- Type: Theatre
- Location: Sechseläutenplatz, Zürich-Seefeld, Switzerland, Falkenstrasse 1, CH-8008 Zürich
- Coordinates: 47°21′54.87″N 8°32′47.27″E
- Completed: 1984
- Owner: Opernhaus Zürich AG
- Landlord: Stadt Zürich

Technical details
- Floor count: 3 including restaurant

Design and construction
- Architect: Claude Paillard

Other information
- Seating capacity: 400

Website
- Official website (in German)

The Bernhard-Theater Zürich or Bernhard Theater is a theatre in German-speaking Switzerland situated at Sechseläutenplatz in Zürich. It is part of the building complex Opernhaus Zürich and also houses the Restaurant Belcanto. The theater was founded by and named after Rudolf Bernhard in 1941.

== History ==
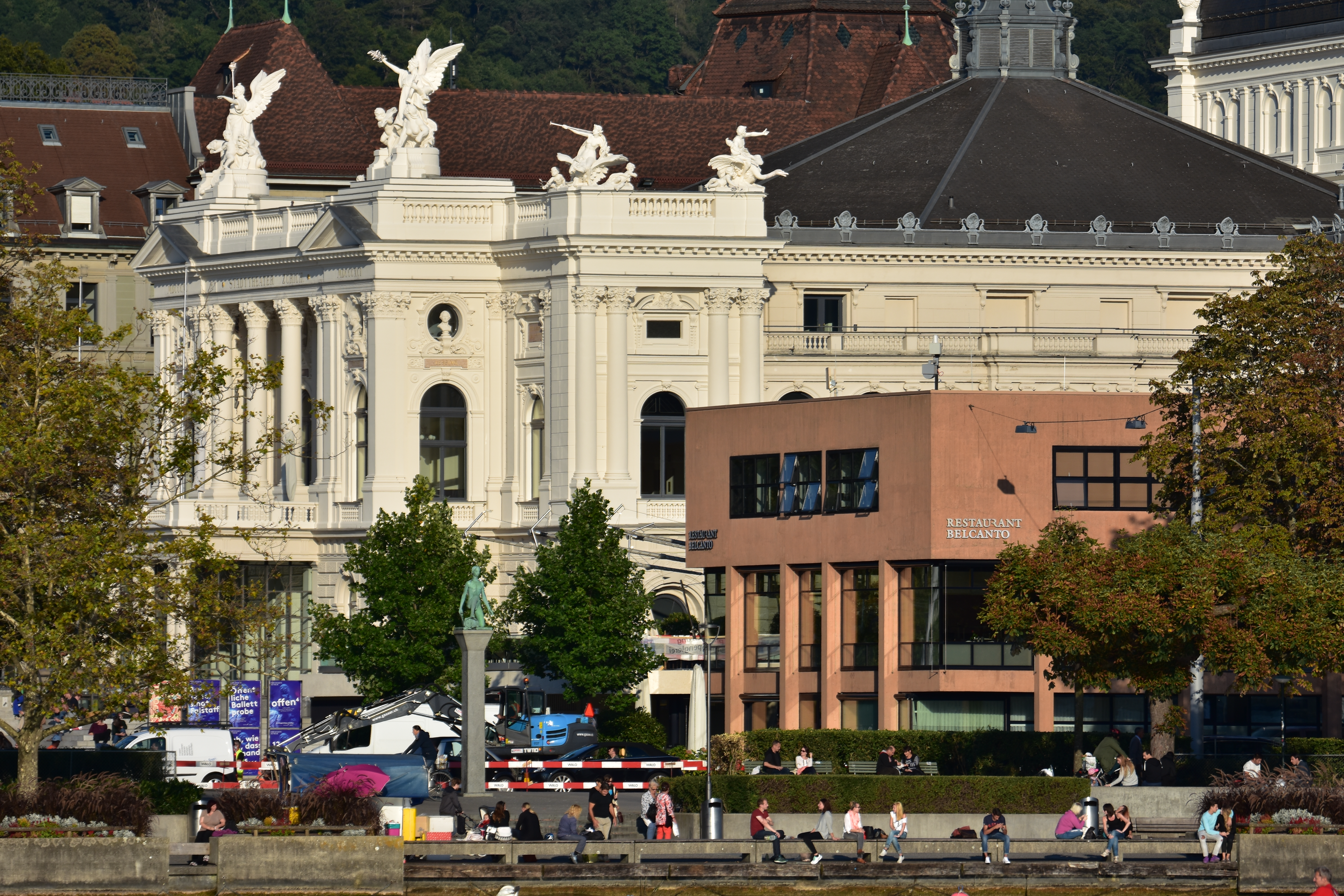
Opernhaus, Bernhard-Theater, Belcanto and Utoquai, as seen from Zürichsee-Schifffahrtsgesellschaft (ZSG) ship MS Helvetia

The Bernhard-Theater is an entertainment theater that housed in its early years guest performances and productions (spoken theater and music theater), initially having an own ensemble to establish a new workplace for the entertainment theater in Zürich. Rudolf Bernhard, a Swiss actor and comedian, founded at the former "Grand Café Esplanade" (built by J. Pfister Picault in 1925) the Rudolf-Bernhard-Theater which premierred on 19/20 December 1941. The ensemle performed farces and comedies in the Swiss German language. The ensemble comprised among others Ernst Bölsterli, Walburga Gmür, Bernard's wife Lisa Lienbach, Peter W. Staub and Willi Stettner; as guests appeared Heinrich Gretler, Emil Hegetschweiler, Alfred Rasser, Schaggi Streuli and Fredy Scheim. From the late 1940s, at the beginning of the season, the ensemble went on tour in Switzerland, while the parent company held guest performances.

In 1961/63 it also housed the Zürcher Märchenbühne which annually produces a fairy tale for children during the winter months, starring among others Vincenzo Biagi, Paul Bühlmann, Inigo Gallo, Walter Andreas Müller, Bella Neri, Margrit Rainer, Jörg Schneider, Peter W. Staub, Schaggi Streuli, Ines Torelli, Erich Vock and Ruedi Walter.

After the death of Bernhard in 1962 his widow handed over the management of the theater to the brothers Eynar and Vincent Grabowsky, resulting in a gradual diversification of the board: for one thing established Swiss German language (dialect) comedies and revues and dialect adaptations of farces (among others by Jörg Schneider) starring Paul Bühlmann, Jörg Schneider, and "Bernhard-Littéraire". Inigo Gallo, Ursula Schäppi, Ruedi Walter, Margrit Rainer, Ines Torelli, Erich Vock and others. On the other hand, the theater also played in-house productions or guest performances, musicals and operettas, and contrived chanson evenings, drag shows, as well as farces and boulevard theater with popular actors (Willy Millowitsch, Hans-Joachim Kulenkampff, Horst Tappert) from Germany, and also children's and youth plays. In addition, Eynar Grabowsky initiated numerous thematic series like "Bernhard-Apéro"

The Bernhard Theater was organized as an Aktiengesellschaft according to Swiss law in 1978. In May 1981 the Esplanade building was demolished, and the present building opened on 27/28 December 1984 after three years of transition in the Kaufleuten building nearby Schanzengraben respectively the Old Botanical Garden. The theater received no subsidies by the municipal government, and funded primarily through the sale of tickets, consummations by the visitors and guest performances. In December 1995 Eynar Grabowsky committed suicide and the company was indebted with several millions Swiss Francs. As a result, following lengthy disputes between director, the various boards of directors and other stakeholders, the theater's rental agreement was terminated by the Opernhaus company, initially at the end of 1998 and compounded to the end of July 2000. Vincent Grabowsky was replaced by his sister Bernadette Czerwenka-Grabowsky at the end of 1998, and after failed restructuring proceedings in January 1999, the Bernhard-Theater AG went bankrupt. Supported by Czerwenka-Grabowsky, a collecting society of the former Grabowsky squad people failed in July 2000. For the season 2000/01 the board elected a new director, but finally he also failed to establish the new labelled "Komödie am Bellevue" as a comedy house for upscale boulevard productions, due to financial difficulties by the end of July 2002. The presidential department (Präsidialdepartement) of the city of Zürich and the Opernhaus parent company elected two new managing directors and an artistic advisory panel for the 2003/04 season as a new beginning. It focused to a younger audience with productions, guest performances and new event formats (shows with celebrity presenters), but also successful Bernhard productions (Bernhard-Littéraire) and farces and comedies of Hans Gmür and Charles Lewinsky starring popular actors like Vock and Walter Andreas Müller. Despite considerable public success, the management failed again.

Among other stage actors, Trudi Roth who was popular as Martha Aebersold in the Swiss comedy serial Fascht e Familie, starred in about a dozen plays, musicals and farces on Bernhard-Theater between 1965 and 2001. Jörg Schneider (1935–2015), a popular Swiss stage and film actor (Lüthi und Blanc, Usfahrt Oerlike) and comedian starring usually in Swiss German language productions, was one of the most prominent members of the ensemble who also worked as a playwright for the theater's Swiss German language productions.

== Facilities ==
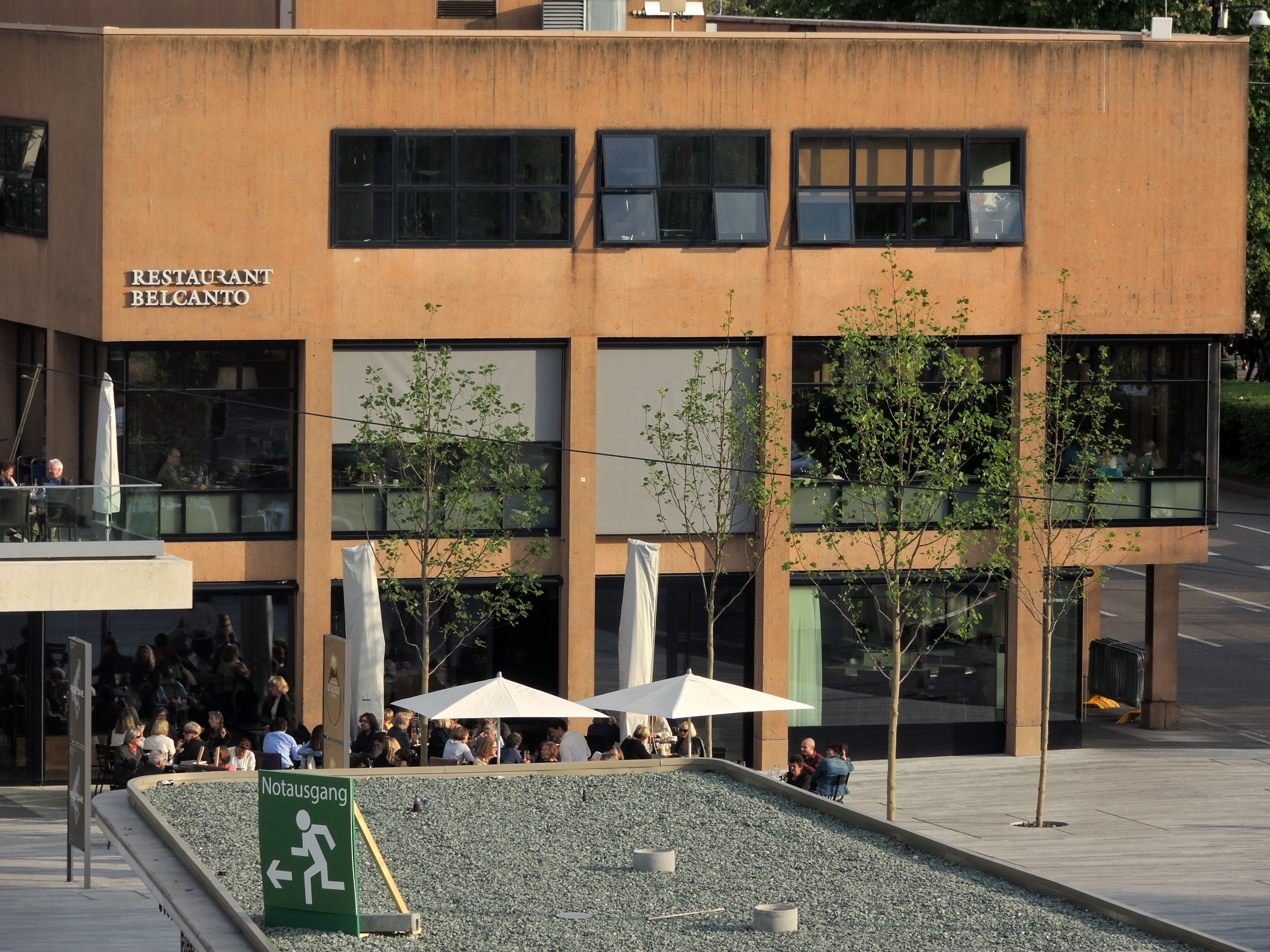
Restaurant Belcanto

The theater houses a proscenium stage (5.4 x 7.1 m/8.4 m x 3.9 m) with a multi-level rising auditorium that haves a seating capacity of about 400 spectators. The large hall can also be rented for events, conferences, openings etc. Tickets are sold on the box office of the Opernhaus. The building complex Opernhaus-Bernhardtheater also houses the Restaurant Belcanto.

== Present activities ==
Since August 2004, when the former management also failed, the premises are hired out for various occasions, but the past years the label Bernhard-Theater Zürich again has been increased used for theater guest performances. For that reason, Hanna Scheuring, a Swiss actress known for her roles as cast of Fascht e Familie and Lüthi und Blanc, was appointed as the new director of the operations of the Bernhard Theater in October 2014, and she revitalized the so-called Bernhard-Apéro events.

Scheuring, for example, modernized the Volkstheater program with performances by stand-up comedians from Germany and Switzerland, who have a monthly guest appearances. In this way, she tried to preserve the tradition of folk theater, but also to further develop it and adapt it to the changing needs of the audience. These include, for example, productions such as "Cabaret" on occasion of the theater's 75th anniversary in December 2016. The new own productions are also successful, particularly the so-called "Bernhard-Matinee" those discussions are moderated by Moritz Leuenberger. This is a revival of the "Bernhard-Apéro", and Leuenberger is according to Scheuring the perfect host. As well as the plays and productions by Erich Vock attract a wide audience. The interior of the theater has been unchanged, especially the tables where drinks are served, now is supplemented by a bar called "Bar Café Bernhard".

== Directors ==
- 1941 – 1962: Rudolf Bernhard
- since 2014: Hanna Scheuring

== Literature ==
- Tanja Stenzl and Andreas Kotte (publisher): Theater am Neumarkt. In: Theaterlexikon der Schweiz. Volume 3, Chronos, Zürich 2005, ISBN 3-0340-0715-9.
- Walter Grieder: Gueten Oobe mitenand. 50 Jahre Bernhard-Theater. Friedrich Reinhardt, Basel 1991, ISBN 3-7245-0712-7.
