= Ines Torelli =

Swiss comedian and actress

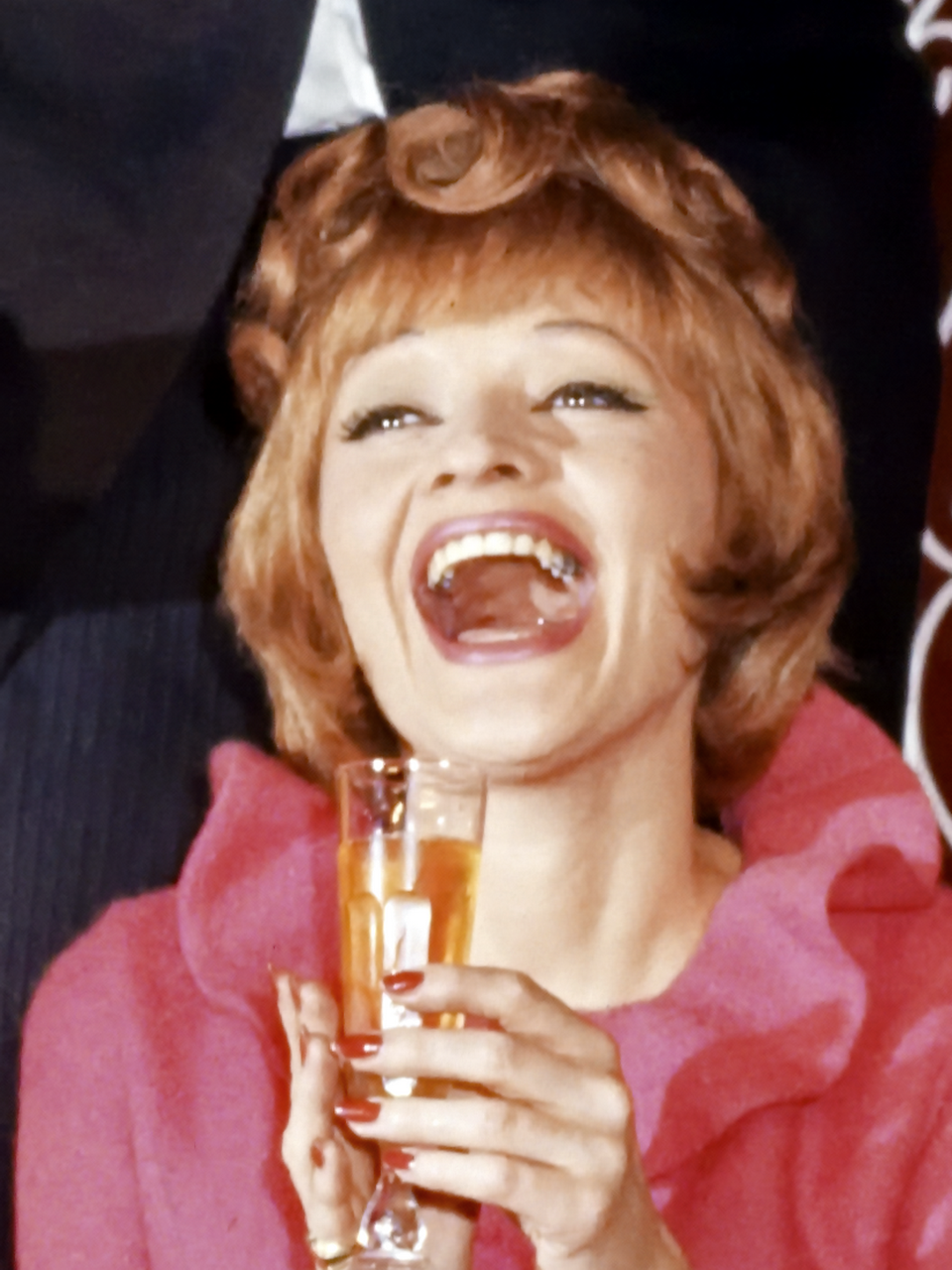
- Torelli, c. 1963
- Born: Ines Stierli; 14 June 1931; St. Gallen, Canton of St. Gallen, Switzerland
- Died: 21 August 2019 (aged 88); Rose Bay, Nova Scotia, Canada
- Occupations: Comedian, radio personality, actress
- Years active: 1954 – 2019
- Spouse: Edi Baur (m. 1991; died 2009)

Ines Torelli (née Ines Stierli; 14 June 1931 – 21 August 2019) was a Swiss comedian, radio personality, and stage, voice and film actress starring usually in Swiss German language cinema and television and stage productions.

== Early life and education ==
Born and raised in St. Gallen, Canton of St. Gallen in Switzerland to Walter Stierli, Ines Torelli worked as a domestic helper in 1948/50, the so-called Welschlandjahr which at that time usually teenage women absolved in western Switzerland (Welschland) to improve the knowledge of the French language. As an autodidact, Torelli got a first chance in the "Cabaret Rüeblisaft" whose member she became between 1954 and 1956. Subsequently, she was engaged by the Cabaret Federal in Zürich, followed by various tours along with Schaggi Streuli, among others in "Sie und de Chef". On Theater am Hechtplatz Torelli embodied the title roles in various musicals, so in 1965 in "Bibi Balù", in 1967 in "Golden Girl", in 1968 "Pfui Martina" and in 1972 in "Viva Banana". In 1968 she starred alongside Ruedi Walter and Margrit Rainer as Olly Moreen in Die kleine Niederdorf-Oper at the Corso Theater in Zürich.

== Theater, cabaret, voice acting, television and film ==
Ines Torelli played in various farces at Bernhard Theater Zürich, as partner of Jörg Schneider and Paul Bühlmann, so among other things in 1968 in "Mademoiselle Pepsi", "Der keusche Lebemann" in 1972, in 1974 in "Die Schwindelfiliale" and in 1976 in "Der fidele Casimir". Unsatisfied by these roles, in 1977 she starred, with artistic but not a commercial success, in the solo program "Torelli total". Nevertheless, she continued to play in comedies like "Potz Millione", with Rainer and Walter and directed by Inigo Gallo, on Bernhard-Theater in 1979/80 that also became a big tour success, and in 1982 in Yves Jamiaque's "Acapulco, Madame" in the dialect version of Schneider and directed by Gallo at the Theater am Hechtplatz.

Torelli had also great success and was very popular as a chanson singer, so with "De Gigi vo Arosa" and as Iduna in Burkhard's "Der schwarze Hecht" at the Corso Theater in 1981. From 1986 to 1994 she was the head of the Zürcher Märchenbühne, and besides of her own dialect version of The Robber Hotzenplotz and Jörg Schneider's 1994 fairytale edition of "Das brave kleine Schneiderlein", Torelli staged among others again with Schneider in numerous musicals with children.

She also became popular by numerous radio appearances and roles in Swiss and German films, among them in Oberstadtgass in 1956 and in one episode of Fascht e Familie. Beside the stage and television and film, again with Jörg Schneider and Paul Bühlmann, Ines Torelli became also very popular in the German speaking area by fairytale-radio plays records.

In 1993 she emigrated with her husband to Canada to reside on the Lunenburg peninsula on the east coast of Canada. In 1996 they acquired an empty factory and rebuilt it into the Starlight Theatre to house up to 500 spectator seats. End of 1998 the financially unsuccessful private theater had to close.

== Personal life and Death ==
Ines Torelli was a citizen of the municipality of Wettswil am Albis in the Canton of Zürich and of Aristau in the Canton of Aargau. In 1991 she married Edi Baur, a Swiss theatre director and actor, who died on 14 October 2009. Although she lived in Canada since 1996, the friendship with Jörg Schneider survived until his death in 2015.

Torelli died on 21 August 2019 at her home in Rose Bay, Nova Scotia, Canada at the age of 88.

== Filmography ==
- 1995: Fascht e Familie (Television series, 1 episode)
- 1981: Potz Millione (stage, broadcast on Swiss television)
- 1975: De grotzepuur
- 1971: Professor Sound und die Pille - Die unwahrscheinliche Geschichte einer Erfindung (Television film)
- 1969: Pfarrer Iseli
- 1968: Die sechs Kummerbuben
- 1961: Chikita
- 1959: Café Odeon
- 1957: Bäckerei Zürrer
- 1956: Oberstadtgass
