= William Tell (1960 film) =

- Directed by: Michel Dickoff
- Written by: Michel Dickoff
- Produced by: Josef R. Kaelin
- Starring: Robert Freitag
- Cinematography: Hans Schneeberger
- Release date: 1960
- Running time: 100 minutes
- Country: Switzerland
- Language: German

William Tell (German: Wilhelm Tell) is a 1960 Swiss adventure film directed by Michel Dickoff and Karl Hartl and starring Robert Freitag, Wolfgang Rottsieper and Alfred Schlageter. It is based on the traditional folk story of William Tell as told in the play William Tell by Friedrich Schiller. The film was entered into the 2nd Moscow International Film Festival.

== Cast ==
- Robert Freitag as Wilhelm Tell
- Wolfgang Rottsieper as Gessler
- Alfred Schlageter as Walter Fürst
- Hannes Schmidhauser as Arnold von Melchtal
- Leopold Biberti as Werner Stauffacher
- Maria Becker as Gertrud Stauffacher
- Heinz Woester as Attinghausen
- Georges Weiss as Rudenz
- Birke Bruck as Berta von Bruneck
- Zarli Carigiet as Baumgarten
- Helen Hesse as Baumgartnerin
- Paul Bühlmann as Rudi
- Inigo Gallo as Frieshart
