= Gardi Hutter =

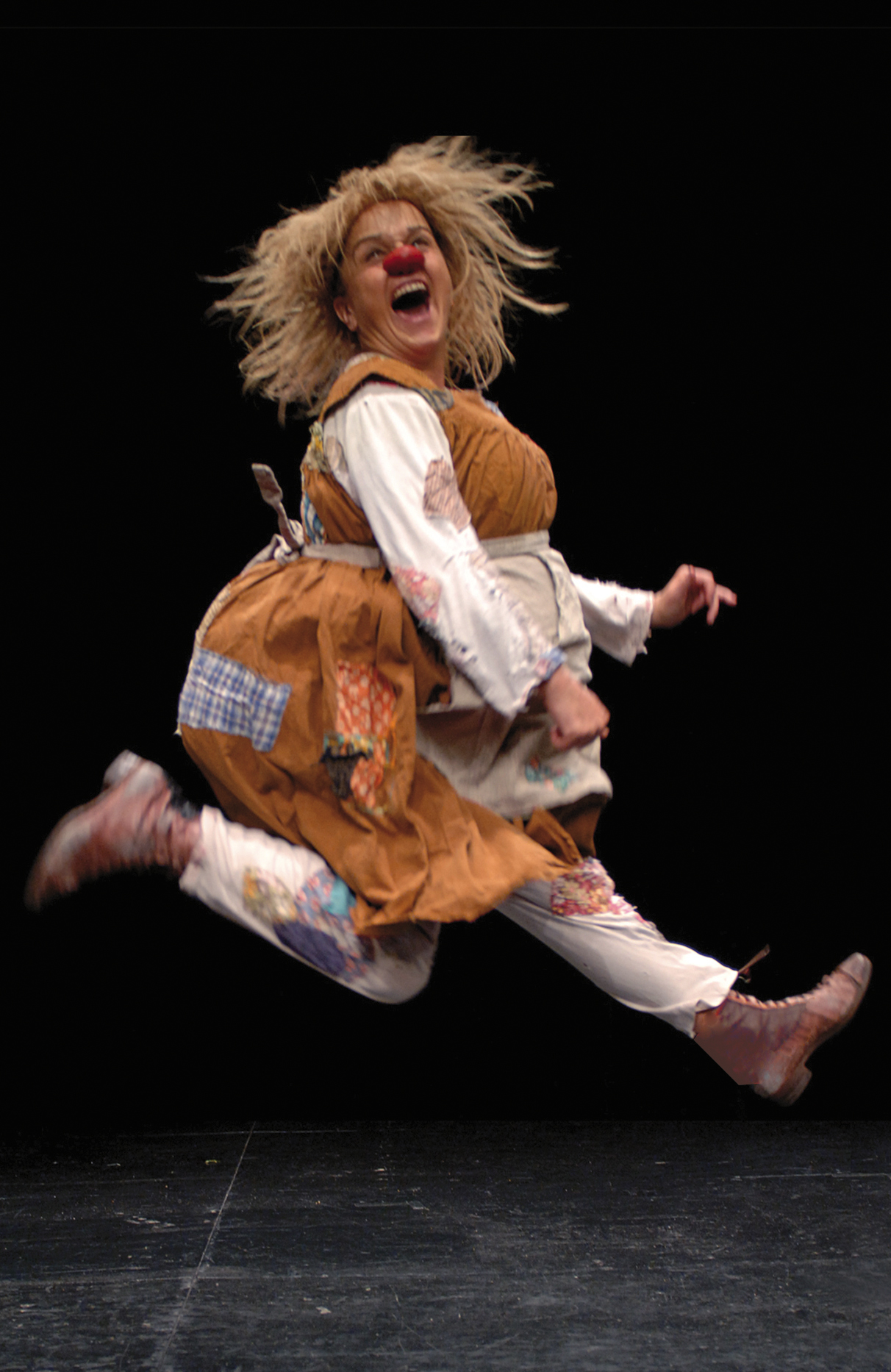
- Gardi Hutter as Jeanne d'ArPpo
- Born: Hutter, Gardi; 5 March 1953 (age 73); Altstätten
- Other name: CLOWNESKES THEATER
- Occupations: Clown, comedian, child literature writer, actress
- Years active: 1981–
- Style: comedian, cabaret
- Awards: Gardi Hutter#Awards
- Website: www.gardihutter.com

Gardi Hutter (born 5 March 1953 in Altstätten) is a Swiss Clown-comedian, author, actress and cabaret artist and a clown of the classical rule.

== Life and career ==
Born on 5 March 1953 in Altstätten, Canton of St. Gallen in Switzerland, Hutter graduated at the Academy of Dramatic Arts in Zürich (Schauspiel-Akademie Zürich) from 1974 to 1977, where she absolved an induction and training in theatre education and theatre pedagogy. Hutter gave lessons to the students, but she felt unhappy not to practice what she taught. At the Centro di ricerca per il teatro (CRT) in Milan Hutter graduated as maestro (master), being also her so-called Clownsgesellenzeit (literally: apprenticeship as a clown) of three years to become an approved member of the Clown community. She was taught by Mario Gonzales, Pantalone of the Théatre du Soleil, Nani Colombaioni (I Colombaioni) and Ferruccio Cainero of the Teatro Ingenuo.,

For the national "700-year anniversary" of Switzerland, Hutter played the women jester in the Federal Assembly Chamber of the Swiss Parliament in 1991. For the festival "700 years" of 1998 of her hometown, Hutter acted as co-writer. In the winter season 1997/98 she was starring in Romulus der Grosse at the Schauspielhaus Zürich.

Since 1981, Hutter had more than 3,300 performances in 30 countries and four continents, including Andorra, Brazil, China, Russia, Spain, Sweden, USA and Switzerland. There were also recordings on TV stations of 17 countries and auditions in numerous radio programs.

== Clowneskes Theater ==
Since 1981, Hutter is touring with her so-called Clowneskes Theater, so far in concert halls, playhouses, barns and culture houses, in festivals and also favelas in Latin America. She designed a new segment of the cabaret theater in Switzerland and in neighbouring countries. As her clown theatre bases not on linguistic mediation, live performances and recordings were also done in Eastern Europe, Southern and Northern America.

== Children's literature ==
Hutter's wrote as of November 2014 four "mamma mia!" children's books, three of them illustrated by Catherine Louis, that are translated into several languages; one was produced exclusively as an audiobook.

== Awards ==
Gardi Hutter was honoured since 1987 by numerous national, but also international awards, among them:

- 1987 Wilhelmshavener Knurrhahn (Germany)
- 1987 Prix de la Presse, Cannes (France)
- 1988 Prix Blanc et Noir, Saint-Gervais-les-Bains (France)
- 1989 Buxtehuder Kleinkunstigel (Germany)
- 1990 Hans Reinhart-Ring
- 1991 Oberschwäbischer Kleinkunstpreis, Ravensburg (Germany)
- 1995 Kulturpreis, St. Gallen (Switzerland)
- 2001 Narrenkappe, Frauenfeld (Switzerland)
- 2005 Schweizer KleinKunstPreis (Switzerland)
- 2007 LOLLIPOP-Children's Swiss Music Award (Switzerland)
- 2007 FringeNYC, New York, Overall excellence award (USA)
- 2007 Festival Internacional de Pallasses, Andorra, Premi Fipa: millor espectacle (Andorra)
- 2013 La Stella de l’Arlecchino errante, Festival de l’Arlecchino errante, Pordenone (Italy)
- 2014: Prix Walo for „WANDERFUL“ (CH)
- 2015: Member of Academy of fools – Dir.: Slava Polunin, Moskva (RU)
- 2017: Premio Publico – Festival Intern. payasos Gran Canari (E)
- 2019: Honorary companion ZHdK – University of the Arts Zurich (CH)
- 2020: Rheintaler Kulturpreis „Goldiga Törgga“ (CH)
- 2022: Großer Valentin-Karlstadt-Preis der Landeshauptstadt München (D)

== Work ==
=== Cabaret ===
- 1981 Jeanne d’ArPpo – Die tapfere Hanna - solo program, written by Cainero + Hutter, directed by Ferruccio Cainero
- 1984 Abra Catastrofe – Eine Hexenkomödie - with Minnie Marx, written by Cainero + Hutter, directed by Ferruccio Cainero
- 1988 So ein Käse - solo program, written by Cainero + Hutter, directed by Ferruccio Cainero
- 1994 Sekretärin gesucht - with Eric Amton Rohnerwritten by Cainero + Hutter, directed by Ferruccio Cainero
- 1998 Das Leben ist schon lustig genug - with Ueli Bichsel, written by Ueli Bichsel and Gardi Hutter
- 2000 Hanna & Knill, Circus Knie, 6 clown cabarets with Ueli Bichsel, Neda und Maite
- 2003 Die Souffleuse - solo program, directed by Fritzi Bisenz and Ueli Bichsel
- 2010 Die Schneiderin - solo program, written (by Gardi Hutter and Michael Vogel, directed by Michael Vogel (Familie Flöz)
- 2018 Gaia Gaudi by Gardi Hutter and Michael Vogel, Juri Cainero, Neda Cainero, Beatriz Navarro.

=== Musicals ===
- 2005 The bride, by/with Gardi Hutter, Sandra Studer, Sue Mathys, directed by Dominik Flaschka and produced for Casinotheater Winterthur;
- 2006 Honkystonky by Huttystucky, musical for children, by/with Gardi Hutter, Erika Stucky, Shirley Hoffmann, directed by Ueli Bichsel and produced for Brothers & Sisters;
- 2014 WANDERFUL - There's no Piz like Show Piz, by/with Gardi Hutter, Sandra Studer, Michael von der Heide, directed by Dominik Flaschka and produced for Just4fun at the Theater am Hechtplatz in Zürich.

=== Books ===
- Mamma mia! Lass das Zaubern, illustrations by Catherine Louis. Nord-Süd, Gossau/Zürich 1997, ISBN 978-3314007811.
- Mamma mia! Was haben wir geweint, illustrations by Catherine Louis. Nord-Süd, Zürich 1999, ISBN 978-3314008962.
- Mamma mia! Geh nicht weg, illustrations by Catherine Louis. Nord-Süd, Zürich 2001, ISBN 978-3314010071.
- Mamma mia! Lass das Zaubern / Mamma mia! Was haben wir geweint (in Swiss-German), Audio-CD, Jumbo, Haumburg 2000, ISBN 978-3-89592-466-8.
- Der kleine See und das Meer, Sauerländer, Aarau 2001, ISBN 978-3794148646.

=== Filmography (excerpt) ===
- 1989 Fata Morgana (actress)
- 1993 Hanna & Rocky (actress und co-writer)
- 2006 Alles bleibt anders (actress)
- 2007 Tell (actress)

== Literature ==
- Susann und Hansueli Moser-Ehinger: Gardi Hutter – die Clownerin. Panorama, Altstätten 1985/86, ISBN 978-3-907506-85-1.
- Lys Wiedmer-Zingg: Jahresspiegel aus der Schweizer Prominenz. Hallwag, Bern 1990, ISBN
- Catherine Prélaz: Les Suisses qui font rire, Promoéditions S.A., Genf 1991, ISBN
- Benita Cantieni: Unter vier Augen, Orell Füssli, Zürich 1994, ISBN
