= Kilimanjaro: How to spell Love! =

2001 film by Mike Eschmann

Kilimanjaro: How to Spell Love, a Swiss romantic TV Movie Comedy, was produced in 2001 by Schweizer Fernsehen & Triluna Film. Distributed by Telepool in Switzerland, Germany and Austria. Written by Jürgen Ladenburger, directed by Mike Eschmann.

== Cast ==
The cast includes Martin Rapold, Gesine Crukowski, Stefan Gubser, Inigo Gallo, and Eliane Chappuis.

== Plot ==
The animal trainer Roberto, who cannot read or write, accidentally gets into a literature TV-Talk Show, while looking for his runaway Chimpanzee. There he also meet his surprised love "Juliette" again, a single mother and very attractive editor in chief.
