= Margrit Rainer =

Swiss actress (1914–1982)

- Margrit Rainer assumably in the late 1970s
- Born: Margrit Rosa Sandmeier; 9 February 1914; Zürich, Canton of Zürich, Switzerland
- Died: 10 February 1982 (aged 68); Zürich, Canton of Zürich, Switzerland
- Occupations: Comedian, radio personality, stage, television and film actor
- Years active: 1938–1982
- Spouse: Fritz Pfister (1934–1938)
- Awards: Margrit Rainer#Awards

Margrit Rainer (born Margrit Rosa Sandmeier, 9 February 1914 – 10 February 1982) was a Swiss comedian, radio personality, and actress. She starred primarily in Swiss- and German-language film, television, and stage productions.

== Early life and education ==
Born and raised in Zürich-Oerlikon, Canton of Zürich in Switzerland, to Elise née Boller and Johannes Rudolf, Margrit Rosa Sandmeier dreamed of a circus career. Her parents forced her to take an apprenticeship as a photo lab assistant, but she secretly took acting classes and singing lessons. At the age of 18, she married Fritz Pfister, a Swiss actor, and they emigrated to Ibiza, where they operated a chicken farm. But the marriage broke down and she returned to Switzerland. Rainer worked as a cashier at the Zürich hotel Hirschen in 1934, the venue of the Cabaret Cornichon.

== Theater, film and television and children's voice actress ==
After first appearances at the Schweizerisches Volkstheater in 1938, Rainer debuted as chinesische Mutter ("Chinese mother") at the Cabaret Cornichon. Engagements at the Corso Theater Zürich and on occasion of the Swiss National Exhibition Landi'39 at Zürichhorn as Mäiti in the Swiss-German play "Steibruch", brought her artistic breakthrough. In the meanwhile, she also staged on the cabarets Resslirytti in Basel and Nebelhorn in Zürich, but from 1938 to 1950 she was a member of the Cornichon ensemble in Zürich where she met Ruedi Walter. She also played in various radio plays, among others in Regenpfeifer by Jürg Amstein and Artur Beul in 1948.

After participation in the musical "Eusi chliini Stadt" at the opening of the Theater am Hechtplatz in Zürich in 1959, Rainer staged there in the 1960s on a regular basis, so in several musicals such as "Bibi Balù" and "Golden Girl". In 1969 Rainer played at the Basler Theater the role of mother in the dialect version of Edward Bond's "Saved".

Margrit Rainer's premiered in the 1951 Swiss film Wahrheit oder Schwindel; her most popular films include Peter's mother in Heidi in 1951 and in 1955 in the sequel, Polizischt Wäckerli in 1956, Die Käserei in der Vehfreude two years later, An heiligen Wassern (Sacred Waters) in 1960 and Demokrat Läppli starring Alfred Rasser in 1961, in 1971 Der Kapitän (The Captain) and ten years later Der Erfinder (The Inventor). In the Swiss television she appeared in 25 episodes of Ein Fall für Mändli alongside Ruedi Walter and Inigo Gallo between 1973 and 1975.

Beside the stage and television and film, from 1970 to 1982 she participated in a number of children's fairy tales and musicals directed by Jörg Schneider.

== Margrit Rainer, Ruedi Walter and Inigo Gallo ==
Margrit Rainer first appeared with Ruedi Walter as cabaret duo in 1951, first among others in a dialect version of Jan de Hartog's "Das Himmelbett", then in numerous popular dialect farces. As "Ehepaar Ehrsam" (Ehrsam couple) in the popular satirical radio program "Spalebärg 77a" from 1955 to 1965 the duo Rainer-Walter became very popular; Spalbärg 77a was filmed in 1957, and in 1962 produced as a musical. Rainer and Walter played in numerous popular dialect plays and farces, and were during thirty years probably the most popular entertainment duo in Switzerland. At the Schauspielhaus Zürich, they had great success in "Die Kleine Niederdorf-Oper" (1951 and 1959) and in 1954 in "Der schwarze Hecht". Great touring successes were among others the dialect adaption of Arthur Lovegrove's "Goodnight, Mrs. Puffin!" in 1969, in 1977 "D'Mueter wott nur s'Bescht", and in 1980 "Potz Millione", both directed by Rainer's spouse Inigo Gallo. Rainer, Gallo and Walter worked in a variety of dialect plays and musicals. Gallo directed, among other things his own Swiss German versions of farces like "Hurra, en Bueb!" "D'Mutter wott nur s'Bescht" and "Potz Millione", that became in 1980 a great success, touring with Rainer, Walter, Gallo and Ines Torelli.

== Personal life and Death ==
Born in Zürich, Margrit Rainer was a citizen of Seengen, by first marriage of Richterswil, and since 1975 also a citizen of Zürich.

Margrit Rainer and Ruedi Walter often were rumored to be a couple; indeed in the early days of their joint cooperation, they were close, but in 1959 the private paths of the film and stage partners diverged. Margrit Rainer found in Inigo Gallo a new partner who also frequently appeared on the side of Margrit Rainer and Ruedi Walter in films and the theater.

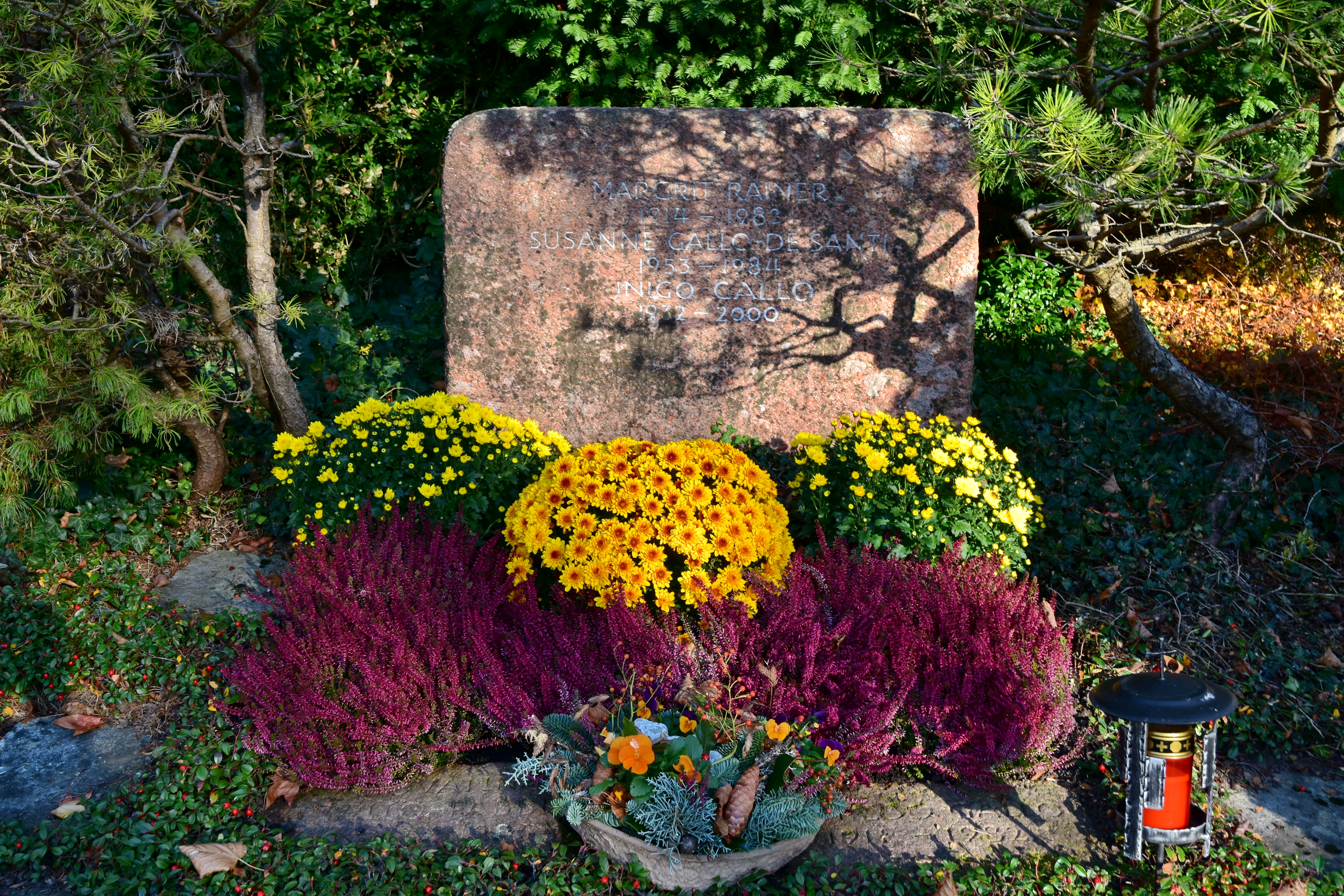
grave of Margrit Rainer, Inigo Gallo and his wife by second marriage, Enzenbühl cemetery, Zürich-Weinegg

Margrit Rainer died after a routine intervention: a cyst was removed in her abdomen, but she died a short time later from internal bleeding on 10 February 1982. She was buried at Enzenbühl cemetery in Zürich-Weinegg alongside Inigo Gallo and his wife from the first marriage.

== Aftermath ==
Margrit Rainer became very popular as she often played the role of the petty-bourgeois housewife and wife, and was to the early 1980s the most popular Swiss folk actress, the "Mother of the Nation"; radiant and warm...but also complex, dark and broken. Only with this double meaning you will do her justice.

Adjacent to the Ruedi-Walter-Strasse in Zürich-Oerlikon where she was born, the Margrit-Rainer-Strasse was named after the popular actress. At the Theater Rigiblick, on occasion of the artist's 100th birthday, in September 2014 premiered Euse Rainer chönnt das au!, a play respectively musical dedicated to Margrit Rainer, who's still popular although she died 32 years ago.

== Filmography (selected works) ==
- 1935: Zyt ischt Gält - Gritli Honegger
- 1941: De Hotelportier
- 1951: Wahrheit oder Schwindel
- 1952: Palace Hotel - Hilde Staub - Telefonistin
- 1952: Heidi - Peter's mother
- 1955: Heidi und Peter (Heidi and Peter)
- 1955: Polizischt Wäckerli - Hedwig Wäckerli
- 1956: Oberstadtgass - Frieda Jucker
- 1957: Der 10. Mai (The Tenth of May) - Frau Wyss
- 1957: Glück mues me ha - Margrit Baumann
- 1958: Zum goldenen Ochsen (Golden Ox Inn) - Marie Egli
- 1958: Die Käserei in der Vehfreude (aka The Fear of Power) - Eisi / Zenzi
- 1959: Hinter den sieben Gleisen - Frau Herzog - Bahnwärterin
- 1960: Anne Bäbi Jowäger - I. Teil: Wie Jakobli zu einer Frau kommt - Mädi
- 1960: An heiligen Wassern (Sacred Waters) - Creszenz Waldisch - die Bärenwirtin
- 1961: Demokrat Läppli - Agathe - Läpplis Schwester
- 1962: Der 42. Himmel (The 42nd Heaven) - Frau Beilfleiss
- 1962: Anne Bäbi Jowäger - II. Teil: Jakobli und Meyeli - Mädi
- 1964: Geld und Geist (Money and Spirit) - Dorngrütbäuerin
- 1967: Polizist Wäckerli in Gefahr (Policeman Waeckerli in Danger) - Hedwig Wäckerli
- 1968: Die sechs Kummerbuben - Bäbi
- 1968: Sommersprossen (aka Beyond Control, Sex and Violence Beyond Control, aka What a Way to Die)
- 1969: Pfarrer Iseli - Haushälterin Regula
- 1971: Der Kapitän (The Captain) - Elsie Haas
- 1972: Gute Abig, Signor Steiger (TV Movie) - Frau Murer
- 1972: Nid jetz, Schatz! (TV Movie) - Ambrosia Hug
- 1973-1975: Ein Fall für Männdli (TV Series, 25 episodes) - Rosa Emmenegger
- 1978: Anne Bäbi Jowäger - Mädi
- 1980: Der Erfinder (The Inventor) - Herta
- 1981: Potz Millione (TV Movie, broadcast of the theater play) - Leni Hugentobler (final film role)

== Awards ==
- 1978: Prix Walo
- 1958: Movie award of the city of Zürich (Filmpreis der Stadt Zürich)

== Literature ==
- Ernst Reinhardt: Ruedi Walter. Spuren eines Schauspielerlebens. Friedrich Reinhardt Verlag, Basel 1984, ISBN 3-7245-0549-3.
