= Harper's Hand-Book for Travellers =

Series of travel guide books

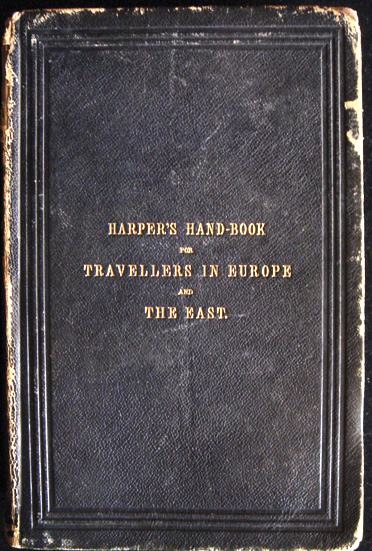
Harper's Hand-Book for Travellers in Europe and the East, 1862

Harper's Hand-Book for Travellers (est.1862) was a series of travel guide books published by Harper & Brothers of New York. Each annual edition contained information for tourists in Europe and parts of the Middle East. The "indefatigable" William Pembroke Fetridge wrote most of the guides from 1862 until at least 1885. In its day the Harper's Hand-Book competed with popular guides such as Baedeker, Bradshaw's, and Murray's. In 1867 critic William Dean Howells found Harper's Hand-Book "chatty and sociable." Readers included Lucy Baird, daughter of Spencer F. Baird.
