= Inigo Gallo =

Swiss actor (1932–2000)

- Inigo Gallo in November 2000
- Born: 2 November 1932; Zürich, Canton of Zürich, Switzerland
- Died: 15 December 2000 (aged 68); Oberweningen, Canton of Zürich, Switzerland
- Occupations: Comedian, radio personality, stage, television and film actor
- Years active: 1951–2000
- Awards: Inigo Gallo#Awards

Inigo Gallo (2 November 1932 – 15 December 2000) was a Swiss comedian, radio personality, and stage and film actor starring usually in Swiss German language cinema and television and stage productions.

== Life and work ==
Born in Zürich, Canton of Zürich in Switzerland, Inigo Gallo had as a child actor appearances on Schauspielhaus Zürich, among other things as Walterli in Schiller's Wilhelm Tell. From 1948 to 1951, he was educated at the Bühnenstudio Zürich, and in 1951/52 Gallo got guest engagements at the Schauspielhaus Zürich, and from 1952 to 1958 engagements at the Stadttheater St. Gallen. In 1958, Gallo worked as a freelance director, actor and author, among others, at the Stadttheater St. Gallen, Stadttheater Basel and Schauspielhaus: in 1959 as Bunker Willy in Die kleine Niederdorf-Oper and in the musical "Eusi chliini Stadt" at the Theater am Hechtplatz in Zürich. Since then, Gallo worked together with Ruedi Walter in a variety of dialect plays and musicals, and with his later second wife and long-year stage partner Margrit Rainer. He directed, among other things his own Swiss German versions of farces like "Hurra, en Bueb!" "D'Mutter wott nur s'Bescht" and "Potz Millione", which became in 1980 a great success, touring with Margrit Rainer, Ruedi Walter, Gallo and Ines Torelli. After the death of Margrit Rainer, Gallo went further on tour with Walter, among others as Chauffeur Johann 'in Charles Lewinsky's production of "Drei Männer im Schnee", and Prof Dr Emil Burgholz in Mary Chase's adaptation "My Fründ Hanspi" ("Harvey"). From 1972 Gallo also worked with the Bernhard-Theater Zürich in numerous Christmas musicals for children, usually under the direction of Jörg Schneider. In 1987 Gallo played Edouard Dindon in the successful Swiss premiere of Jerry Herman's musical "La Cage aux Folles", and has also appeared on Schauspielhaus in the world premiere of Urs Widmer's "Dr neu Noah ", followed by appearances on Atelier-Theater Bern, Sommertheater Winterthur, Bernhard Theater, Städtebundtheater Biel-Solothurn and Theater Fauteuil in Basel. In 2000, he participated in the production of Charles Lewinsky's "Ganz e Feini family" with, next to it in free productions. Since 1954, he carried out numerous works for radio, film and television, including the recording of several Dialektschwänke with Gallo himself, Margrit Rainer and Ruedi Walter.

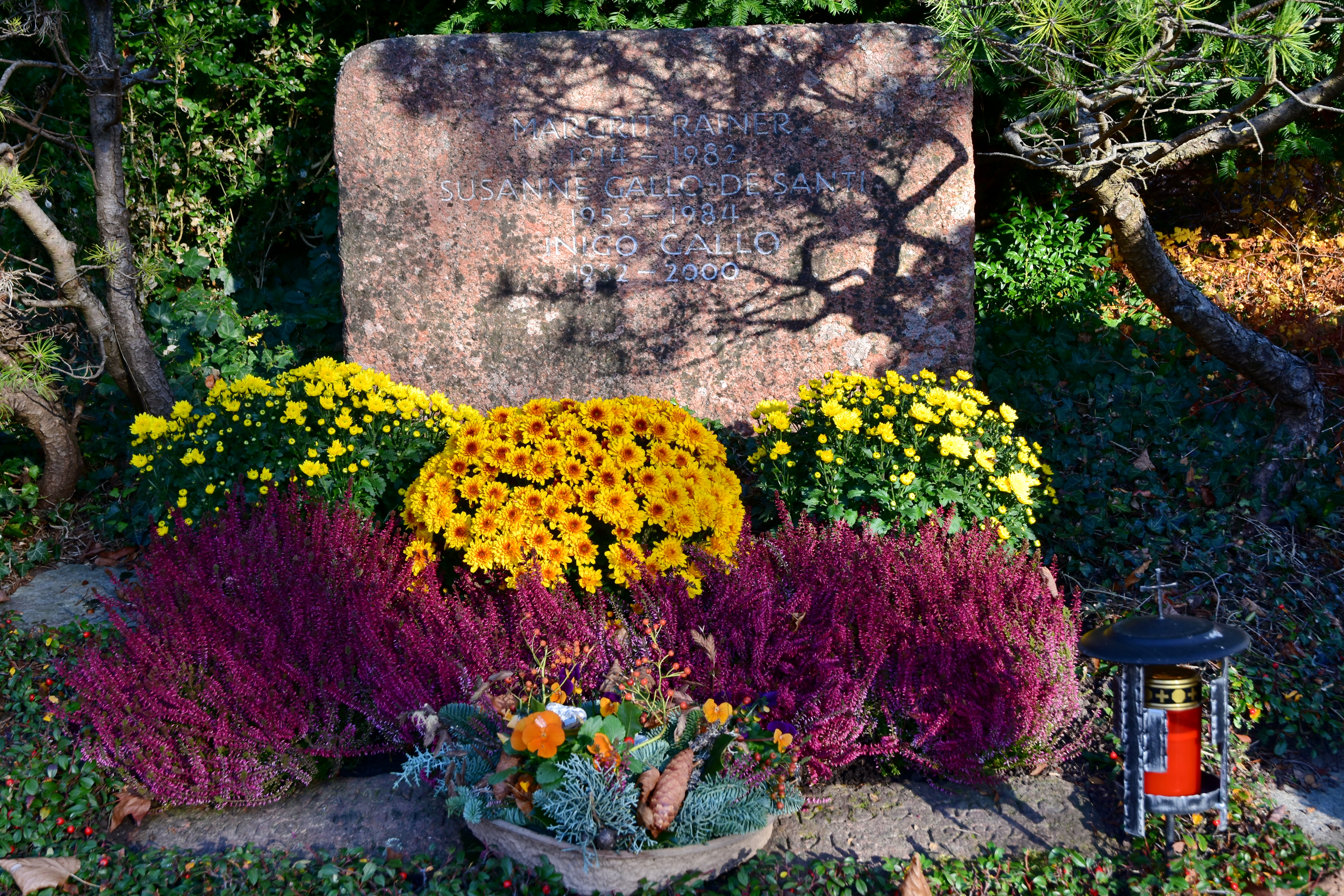
grave of Margrit Rainer, Inigo Gallo and his wife from second marriage, Enzenbühl cemetery, Zürich-Weinegg

== Awards ==
- 1993: Prix Bernhard by Bernhard-Theater Zürich for Georges in Poiret's "Der Narrenkäfig"
- 1993: Prix Walo

== Death ==
Gallo died on 15 December 2000, due to liver cancer.

Inigo Gallo was buried at Enzenbühl cemetery in Zürich-Weinegg alongside his life companion and stage partner Margrit Rainer, and his wife from his second marriage.

== Filmography ==
- 1960: Der Teufel hat gut lachen - Mario / Kellner
- 1960: Wilhelm Tell - Frieshart
- 1961: Chikita - Gehri
- 1961: Demokrat Läppli - Dr. Strübin - Rechtsanwalt
- 1962: Der 42. Himmel
- 1962: Snow White and the Seven Jugglers - Diener Pedro
- 1966: The Strangler of the Tower - Pietro Broggini
- 1970: Pfarrer Iseli - Kommissar Stäubli
- 1971: Professor Sound und die Pille - Die unwahrscheinliche Geschichte einer Erfindung (TV Movie) - Verkehrspolizist
- 1973–1975: Ein Fall für Männdli (TV Series, 25 episodes) - Herr Tobler
- 1976: The Swiss Conspiracy - Captain Frey
- 1978: Last In, First Out (aka L'ordre et la sécurité du monde and Concorde Affair) - Le chauffeur de taxi
- 1980: Theo Against the Rest of the World - Vater Ines
- 1981: Der Erfinder (The Inventor) - Viktor
- 1982: Der Besuch der alten Dame (TV Movie) - Loby
- 1983: Teddy Bär - Dr. Traber
- 1988: Klassäzämekunft - Peter Engler
- 1991: Mein Bruder, der Clown (TV Movie) - Schweizer
- 1995: Fascht e Familie (TV Series, 1 episode) - Herr Krähenbühl
- 2001: Studers erster Fall (TV Movie) - Chefkommissar Straub
- 2001: Kilimanjaro: How to spell Love! - Dr. Hürlimann (final film role)
