= William Pembroke Fetridge =

American writer (1827–1896)

Coordinates: 42°21′31.04″N 71°3′27.96″W

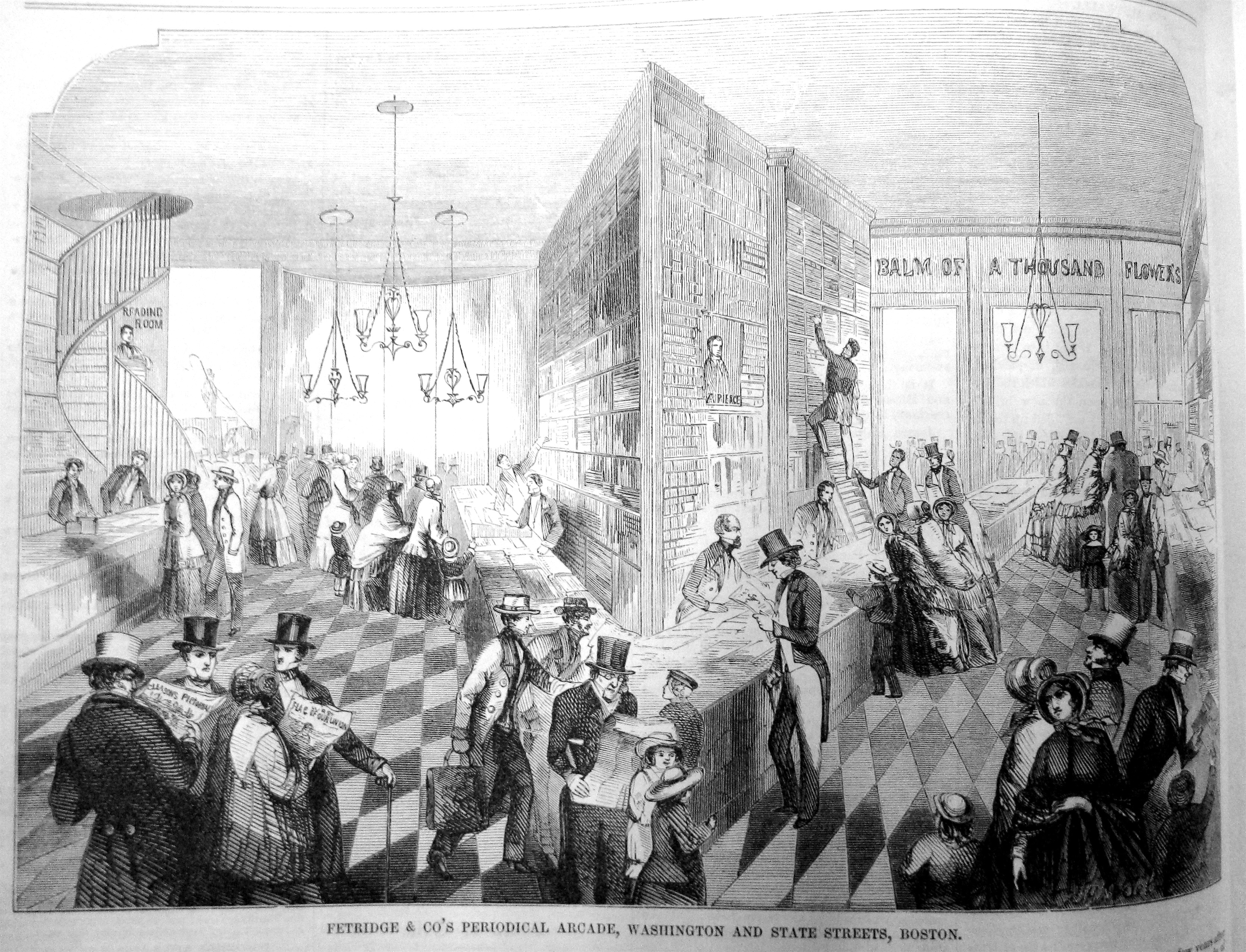
Fetridge & Co. Periodical Arcade, Boston, 1852

William Pembroke Fetridge (1827-1896) was a travel writer, publisher, bookseller and periodicals distributor. He lived in the Boston, Massachusetts area and in Paris, France.

== Brief biography ==
From ca. 1848, W.P. Fetridge lived in East Cambridge, Massachusetts. His children included Henry Pembroke Fetridge.

Fetridge and Company operated in Boston from 1850 through 1855. In addition to publishing books on a wide variety of topics, the company also ran a retail shop that sold magazines, medical journals, law journals, and foreign news. The shop was known as the Periodical Depot or the Periodical Arcade, with entrances on both Washington Street and State Street. (Note: Contemporary rival dealers of periodicals in Boston included: Dyer & Co., Federhen & Co., Hotchkiss & Co., Jordan & Wiley, and Alexander Williams.)

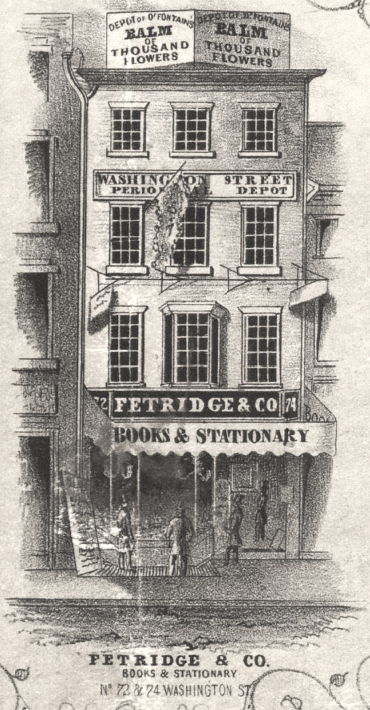
Fetridge & Co., Washington St., Boston, 1852

In 1850, the Periodical Depot published and imported "English books," and served as agents for: Godey's Lady's Book; Harper & Brothers's publications such as Harper's New Monthly Magazine; Gleason's Pictorial Drawing-Room Companion; The Flag of Our Union; Fowler & Wells' phrenological works; Hollick's medical works; Graham's Magazine; Sartain's Magazine; Hunt's Merchant's Magazine and Commercial Review; James Braithwaite's Retrospect of Medicine; Rankin's Abstract of the Medical Sciences; Law Library; London Lancet; "the foreign reviews, ... British and foreign medical reviews, ... Democratic and Whig reviews, ... London newspapers."

The Periodical Arcade also sold Jacob Townsend's Genuine Sarsparilla; and "The Balm of a Thousand Flowers," a soap compound of "oil, ashes and alcohol." In 1851 proprietors of the Periodical Arcade included T.M. Fetridge and Thomas Wagstaff.

Harper's publishing company sent Fetridge to Europe around 1862 to compile a travel guide. The success of the first Harper's Hand-Book for Travellers led to updated editions in later years. Fetridge lived the last part of his life in Paris, where he died in 1896. His son Henry took over as chief editor and director of Fetridge's Handbooks for Travelers in Europe and the East.
