= Usfahrt Oerlike =

- Swiss film poster for Usfahrt Oerlike, depicting Jörg Schneider (left) and Mathias Gnädinger (right)
- Directed by: Paul Riniker
- Written by: Christa Paul; Thomas Hostettler; Jonas Schürch
- Produced by: Paul Riniker; Rudolf Santschi
- Starring: Jörg Schneider; Mathias Gnädinger
- Cinematography: Felix von Muralt
- Music by: Marcel Vaid
- Distributed by: Frenetic Films
- Release date: January 2015
- Running time: 94 minutes
- Country: Switzerland
- Language: Swiss German

Usfahrt Oerlike (German: Ausfahrt Oerlikon) is a 2015 Swiss German-language film. It was filmed and produced at locations in Zürich in Switzerland, and is the second last film starring Mathias Gnädinger, and Jörg Schneider's last movie film.

== Cast ==
- Jörg Schneider as Hans Hilfiker
- Mathias Gnädinger as Willi Keller
- Beatrice Blackwell as Mary
- Daniel Rohr as Beat Hilfiker
- Heidi Maria Glössner as Emilie Brütsch
- Leo Thomas as Sam
- Katharina von Bock as Direktorin Rossmöller
- Stefano Wenk as Oliver
- Klaus-Henner Russius as Dr. Claus Vogel
- Monica Gubser as Annemarie
- Vincenzo Biagi as Dieter
- Sabine Timoteo as Ronja
- Lotti Happle as Nicole
- Aaron Hitz as Thomas
- Martin Villiger as Chorleiter

== Plot (excerpt) ==
Hans (Jörg Schneider) assumes that he has had a good life: He has seen the world and loved his wife Martheli, who died two years earlier. He can barely cope with everyday life and Hans is tired, he wants to die. His best friend Willi (Mathias Gnädinger) will help him to carry out his plan.

An unfortunate accident forces Hans to enter the local retirement home for a few weeks. However, neither the nurse Mary (Beatrice Blackwell) nor the conversations with Mrs. Brütsch (Heidi Maria Glössner) motivate Hans to enjoy his life in the nursing home. But when his son suddenly enters his life again, Hans seems to hesitate ending his life by suicide...

== Title ==
The title of the film derives from the Swiss German term meaning Exit Oerlikon; usfahrt may also refer to "end" (of life).

== Reception ==
Although the storyline is sometimes sluggish and the story does not always add up, the film is worth seeing...On the other hand, the two main characters are a blast.

— Kati Moser, Schweizer Illustrierte on 30 January 2015.

A lovely, melancholy drama about the troubles of age, and silent as sighing to himself smugness. Not always, this film wants to be just that. Most of all, sometimes, it also creates a universal world harmony. Then the melodrama drives something lush, and the story of a small potential suburban reality pushes down into the big humanistic horn. But that does not damage the simple and easy sympathetic core.

— Christoph Schneider, Tages Anzeiger on 28 January 2015.

== Production ==
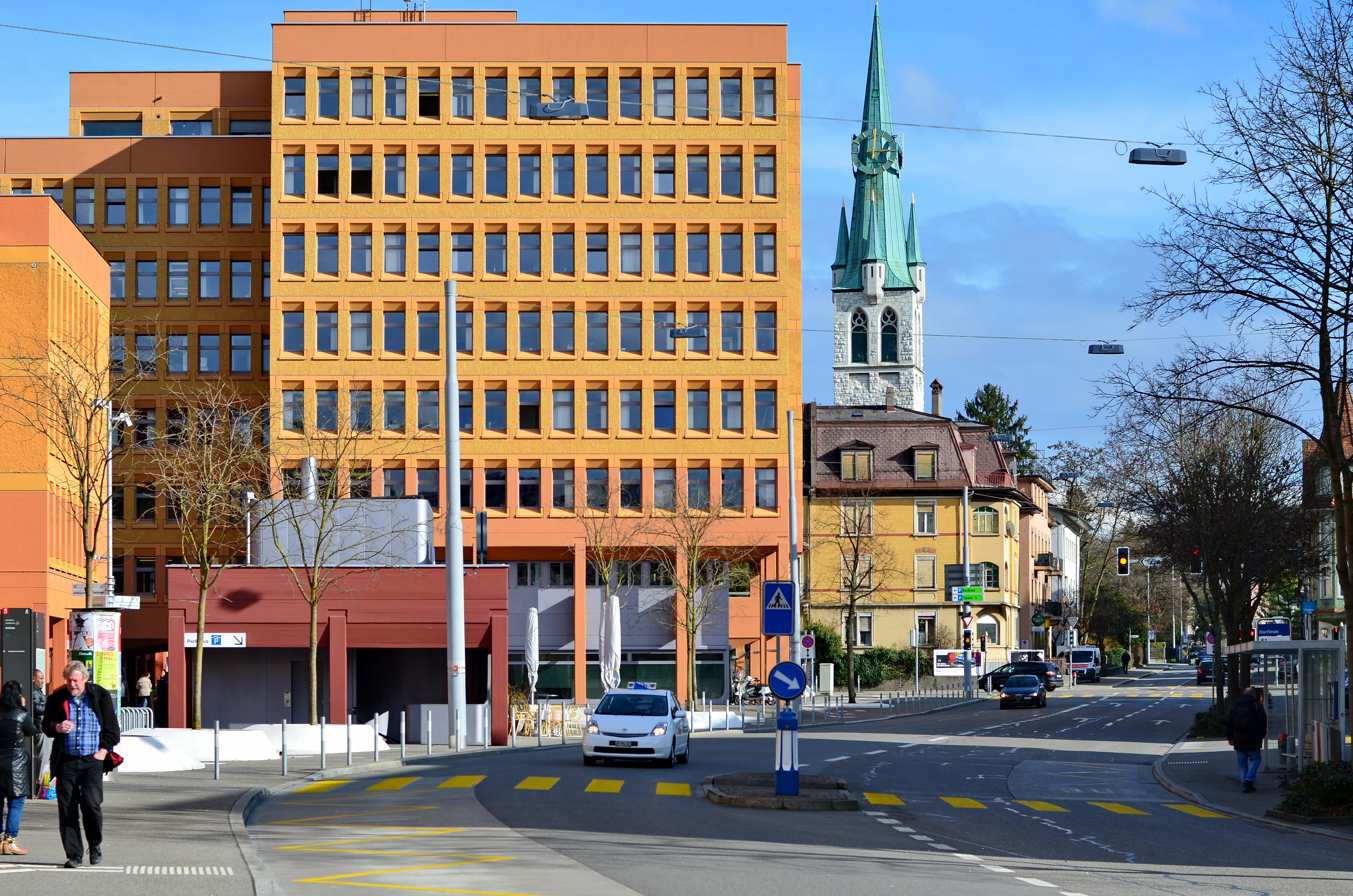
Dorflinde in Oerlikon, one of the film locations

For the plot, the play EXIT by Thomas Hostettler was adapted. The film was shot and produced in Zürich-Oerlikon and at locations in Switzerland. According to Paul Riniker, a sequel was planned but will not be realized as Mathias Gnädinger died on 3 April 2015, and Jörg Schneider on 22 August 2015 at the age of 80 – Schneider was not aware that he was suffering from liver cancer during the film shooting in May 2014.

Premiered at the Solothurn Film Festival on 23 January 2015, Usfahrt Oerlike was aired in Swiss German cinemas starting on 29 January 2015, and on SRF 1 it was shown for the first time on 11 September 2016.

== Festivals ==
- 2015 Schaffhausen Filmfestival
- 2015 Solothurner Filmtage

== Awards ==
- 2015 Solothurn Film Festival: Won Publikumspreis (Prix du public).
