= Hans Gmür =

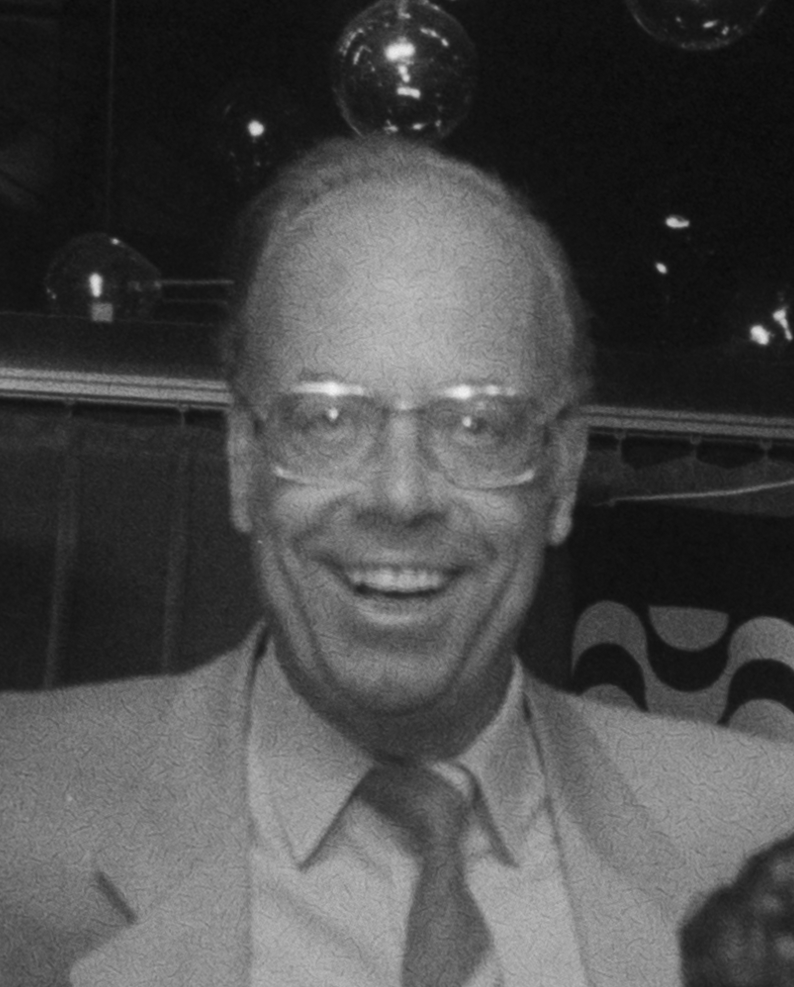
Hans Gmür

Hans Gmür (1 February 1927 – 15 April 2004) was a Swiss-German theatre author, director, composer and producer.

He was born in Chur, Switzerland, and graduated from the University of Zürich. Among others, Gmür wrote farces and comedies starring popular Swiss actors like Walter Andreas Müller for the Bernhard-Theater Zürich.

He died of complications of a back operation at Paraplegikerzentrum Nottwil in Nottwil, Switzerland. He leaves his wife, Erna, to whom he was married for 50 years.

== Selected filmography ==
- The Model Husband (1959)
