= Walter Andreas Müller =

- Born: September 3, 1945 (age 80); Zürich, Switzerland
- Occupations: Stage and film actor, comedian
- Years active: since 1975
- Notable work: Fascht e Familie (1994–1999)

Walter Andreas Müller (born 3 September 1945) is a Swiss stage and film actor starring usually in Swiss German language cinema and television and stage productions.

== Early life and education ==
Born in Zürich, canton of Zürich, in Switzerland, Walter Andreas Müller lives in the municipality of Russikon. His mother was a gifted painter and his father worked as a clarinetist and saxophonist. After a training as a bookseller and publisher, Walter Andreas Müller devoted 21 years of acting and attended acting school in Zürich.

== Theater, television and cabaret ==
Thenafter Müller had firm commitments on various German stages, returned to Switzerland in 1972 and worked for several years at the Theater an der Winkelwiese, and also starred on the Bernhard-Theater Zürich.

National popularity gained Müller with Ursula Schäppi in 1977 in Kurt Felix' "Teleboy" show, and as the Chifler couple; even a song was listed in the Swiss radio charts.

Walter Andreas Müller's most widely known role is the character of Hans Meier in the Swiss comedy series Fascht e Familie in the 1990s. He has also parodied public figures such as Gilbert Gress, Christoph Blocher, and Tina Turner. In addition to this work, he has performed at numerous major theaters in Switzerland. Müller continues to work as a freelance actor, radio host, and tours as a comedian, impersonator, and parodist.

== Filmography (selected works) ==
- 2014: Tyfelstei
- 1994–1999: Fascht e Familie (100 episodes)
- 1975: Emil auf der Post

== Awards ==
- 1987: Prix Walo Publikumsliebling together with Ursula Schäppi
