= Paul Bühlmann =

Swiss actor (1927–2000)

- Paul Bühlmann probably in the early 1990s
- Born: 12 February 1927; Zürich, Canton of Zürich, Switzerland
- Died: 15 July 2000 (aged 73); Zürich
- Occupations: Comedian, radio personality, stage, television and film actor
- Years active: 1950–2000
- Children: Agnes Bühlmann
- Awards: Paul Bühlmann#Awards

Paul Bühlmann (12 February 1927 – 15 July 2000) was a Swiss comedian, radio personality, and stage and film actor starring usually in Swiss German language cinema and television and stage productions.

== Life and work ==
Born in Zürich, Canton of Zürich in Switzerland, Paul Bühlmann was the father of the Swiss actress Agnes Bühlmann. Bühlmann was educated as a merchant, trained in theatre with Adolf Manz between 1947 and 1950, received elocution by Ellen Widmann and role studies by Gustav Knuth. From 1950 to 1960 and 1962 to 1965 Bühlmann played numerous mostly small roles at Schauspielhaus Zürich, among them the conductor in the premiere of Friedrich Dürrenmatt's play Der Besuch der alten Dame (The Visit) in 1956. In 1960 he debuted as a cabaret artist in "Vermisst wird" with César Keiser. Karl Suter discovered his talents, and he starred at Theater am Hechtplatz in musicals in 1965, 1967 and 1968.

From 1968 to 1971 Bühlmann was a member of the Theater am Neumarkt ensemble, since 1971 on Bernhard-Theater Zürich where he was nominated by the leading actor Jörg Schneider to a role in the farce "Der keusche Lebemann". Bühlmann and Schneider succeeded with the Polizischt Wäckerli radio play in 1966, as well as with the stage production and the television series. The television productions "Zum goldige Leue" and "Zum doppelte Engel" strengthened Bühlmann and Schneider's reputation. The comedy duo played since the late 1960s almost every season in new farces. From 1972 he worked under Schneider's direction in numerous children's musicals. He guested on Sommertheater Winterthur and Städtebundtheater Biel-Solothurn including in Molière's "The Miser" in 1977 and in 1984 in Flatows "Das Geld liegt auf der Bank". In a play at Wasserkirche Bernhard embodied Mammon in Hofmannsthal's "Jedermann" in 1984. In 1991 he played at the Bernhard-Theater the title role in "De Schacher Sepp" (dialect version of "Der Brandner Kaspar" by Jörg Schneider); for this role, Bühlmann was awarded the Prix Bernhard. Bühlmann impersonated numerous roles in radio plays, in Swiss films and on Swiss television.

Beside the stage and television and film, again with Jörg Schneider and Ines Torelli, Bühlmann became also very popular in the German speaking area by his Kasperle, Pumuckl (Bühlmann gave his voice to Meister Eder) and fairytale-radio plays records. The Chasperli (Swiss German for "Kasperle") radio plays belong to the children's culture in the German-speaking Switzerland since more than 40 years, and the records are still sold about 50,000 times a year, and to date approximately three million copies have been sold.

== Awards ==
- 1991: Prix Bernhard

== Filmography (selected works) ==
- 1991: Auf der Suche nach Salome
- 1980: Matto regiert (Television film)
- 1979: Das gefrorene Herz (The Frozen Heart)
- 1970: Prometheus aus der Seitengasse (Television film)
- 1967: Polizist Wäckerli in Gefahr
- 1960: Wilhelm Tell
- 1957: Taxichauffeur Bänz
