= Jörg Schneider (actor) =

- Jörg Schneider starring as Hans Hilfiker in Usfahrt Oerlike
- Born: 7 February 1935; Zürich, Switzerland
- Died: 22 August 2015 (aged 80); Wetzikon, Switzerland
- Occupations: Stage and film actor, comedian and voice actor
- Years active: since 1955
- Notable work: Usfahrt Oerlike (2015)
- Website: www.joergschneider.ch (in German)

Jörg Schneider (7 February 1935 – 22 August 2015) was a Swiss stage and film actor starring usually in Swiss German-language cinema and television and stage productions. He gained great renownedness in the German-speaking area by numerous Kasperle, Pumuckl and fairytale-radio plays records and also adapted plays for the Swiss German language.

== Life ==
Born in Zürich, canton of Zürich, in Switzerland, Jörg Schneider lived in the municipality of Wetzikon. For three years he attended the teacher training college, before he completed a commercial apprenticeship. At the age of 20, Jörg Schneider premiered at the Hirschen (in fact a restaurant) theater in Zürich as co-founder of the Cabaret Äxgüsi, and on occasion of the Saffatheater in the cabaret comedy Lysistrata in 1958. Schneider started acting in the 1960s, getting popular in comedian-related rules, later also in radio plays and as stage actor and comedian, and was one of the most prominent Swiss German actors and comedians. For his lifetime work, Jörg Schneider was awarded with the Prix Walo 2013 in May 2014. Yet end of January 2015, Schneider participated in Solothurn Film Festival at the premiere of his last movie Usfahrt Oerlike, while for the shooting in May 2014 Schneider did not know that he was suffering from liver cancer. Jörg Schneider was one of the most popular actors of the German-speaking Swiss entertainment scene in comedy and boulevard theater, where he had up to 300 performances a year. He was considered a comedian with contagious enthusiasm.

== Work ==
=== Theater ===
Jörg Schneider (on the right) with Ines Torelli (in red), c. 1963

Already while attending the teacher college, Jörg Schneider took acting classes and voice lessons. In 1955 he was co-founder of the cabaret "Äxgüsi" in Zürich, and in 1957 Jörg Schneider premiered at the Stadttheater Zürich as comedian. In 1960 he began working with Schaggi Streuli, whose radio and TV play Polizischt Wäckerli as "Hügü Vögeli" gained national notoriety in 1963. For the Theater am Hechtplatz he gained Swiss German-versions of Grimm's fairy tales in which he also starred, and in 1973 was honored with Ehrenpreis der Erziehungsdirektion des Kantons Zürich, the top prize of the ministry of education of the Canton of Zürich. Between 1969 and 1971 he was permanent staff member of the municipal stage Heidelberg in Germany. Returned to Switzerland, Jörg Schneider played mainly on farces produced by Eynar Grabowsky for the Bernhard-Theater Zürich; the plays, including Der keusche Lebemann ("The chaste bon vivant") and Swiss German adaptations of Der Pantoffelheld ("The henpecked"), Der fidele Kasimir and Fünf im Doppelzimmer ("Five in a double room") were played 200-300 times throughout Switzerland. For the role of the taxi chauffeur in Schneider's own adaptation Liebe macht erfinderisch of Ray Cooney's Run for Your Wife, Jörg Schneider received the Bernhard Prix in 1985. Paul Bühlmann and Ines Torelli were Schneider's most frequent partners on stage for many years.

In the 1990s Schneider mostly appeared along with Erich Vock in several with Vock self-produced farces and comedies, but he always returned to the classic comedy roles and serious roles: in 1972 in Zürich Nick Bottom (Zettel) in Shakespeare's A Midsummer Night's Dream and in 1980 alongside Ruedi Walter in the Swiss German adaptation Warte uf de Godot (Waiting For Godot). At the Festival Bad Hersfeld Schneider received for his portrayal of Sancho Panza in Dale Wasserman's musical Mann von La Mancha the Bad Hersfeld Prize in 1985. Jörg Schneider embodied in 1991 the title role in Molière's The Imaginary Invalid, and in 1992 the role of Director Gross in D'Benachrichtigung, a Swiss German adaptation of Václav Havel's Alert. In 1993/94 schneider toured again as Zettel (Nick Bottom ) and as the fool in the Twelfth Night on occasion of various open-air performances in Switzerland, and in 1999 the title role in a dialect edition of Miller's Death of a Salesman on stage at the Theater des Kantons Zürich.

=== Voice acting and children's plays ===
Beside the stage, Jörg Schneider also is very popular in the German-speaking area by his Kasperle, Pumuckl and fairytale-radio plays records. The Chasperli (Swiss German for "Kasperle") radio plays by Jörg Schneider – once again, many of the records in co-operation with Paul Bühlmann and Ines Torelli – belong to the children's culture in the German-speaking Switzerland since more than 40 years, and the records are still sold about 50,000 times a year, and to date approximately three million copies have been sold. Jörg Schneider also wrote about 40 Kasperle stories, directed and translated serious and tabloid pieces in dialect versions and wrote children's musicals. For Heidi, in 2002 he was awarded with the "fairy-tale-Oscar" S'Goldig Chrönli.

=== Television and film ===
In 1960 Jörg Schneider premierred in Wenn d'Fraue wähle, a Swiss German comedy. His best known television roles are probably the chef Koni Frei in the Swiss television series Motel and as Oskar Wehrli from 2004 to 2006 in Lüthi und Blanc, but he also appeared in the popular Swiss television comedy Fascht e Familie in two episodes. In their last movie, the 2015 comedy Usfahrt Oerlike about a man who decided to commit suicide, Jörg Schneider starred alongside Mathias Gnädinger who died in April 2015.

== Death ==
Schneider died of a serious illness – which had forced him in September 2014 to cancel his farewell tour Happi Änd as a comedian – on 22 August 2015 at the age of 80; one month before he told in an interview he had stopped chemotherapy treatment. Äxgüsi!, an audio book with passages of his autobiography will be released posthumously: although the shots were very tiring for him, the recording gave him a lot of joy, Jörg Schneider also told. The funeral took place within the family; a public acknowledgment was celebrated at the Fraumünster church in Zürich on 26 September 2015.

== Awards (excerpt) ==
- 2015: Solothurner Filmtage: Won Publikumspreis (Prix du public) for Usfahrt Oerlike.
- 2013: Prix Walo, won Ehren-Prix Walo.
- 2002: S'Goldig Chrönli for the children's musical Heidi.
- 1995: Sparten-PRIX WALO for Schauspieler.
- 1985: Bernhard Prix for Liebe macht erfinderisch, Schneider's adaptation of a play by Ray Cooney.
- 1985: Bad Hersfeld-Preis, Sancho Panza in the musical Der Mann von La Mancha.
- 1973: Ehrenpreis der Erziehungsdirektion des Kantons Zürich for the Swiss German-versions plays of Grimm's fairy tales.

== Filmography (selected works) ==
- 1960: Wenn d'Fraue wähle
- 1984: Motel
- 1996–1998: Fascht e Familie (2 episodes)
- 2004–2006: Lüthi und Blanc (120 episodes)
- 2008: Happy New Year
- 2015: Usfahrt Oerlike

== Literature ==
- Jörg Schneider: Äxgüsi! : aus meinem Leben. Autobiography on occasion of Jörg Schneider's 80th birthday. Tudor Recording, Zürich 2015, ISBN 978-3-037765-18-0; also as audio, read by Jörg Schneider, EAN: 7619911083441
