= Schaggi Streuli =

Swiss actor

Schaggi Streuli (1899–1980) was a Swiss film and television actor, who also starred on stage at the Bernhard-Theater Zürich.

== Selected filmography ==
- Gilberte de Courgenay (1942)
- Madness Rules (1947)
- Palace Hotel (1952)
- Sacred Waters (1960)
