= Ruedi Walter =

Swiss actor and comedian (1916–1990)

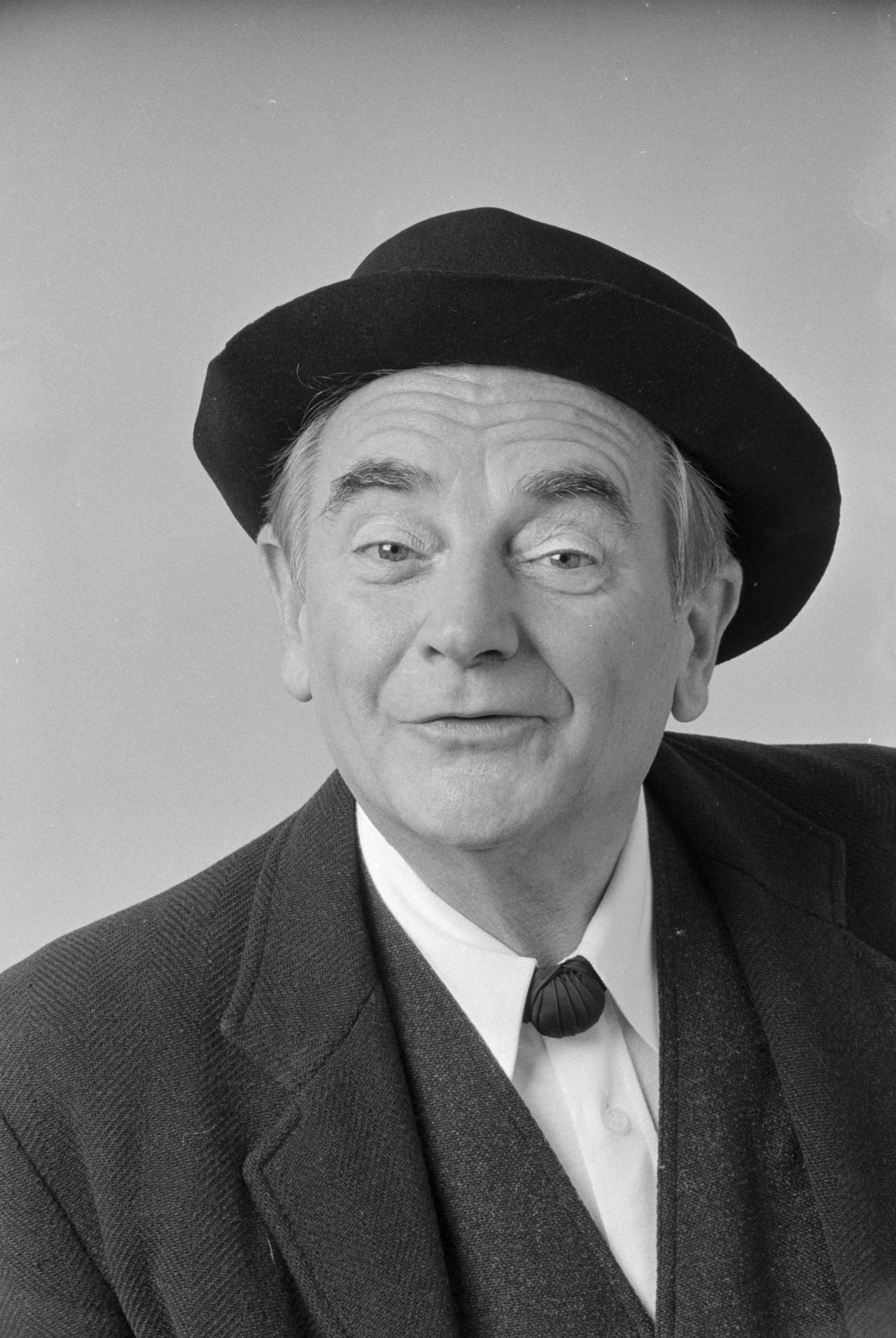
- Walter in 1978
- Born: Hans Rudolf Häfeli; 10 December 1916; Solothurn, Switzerland
- Died: 16 June 1990 (aged 73); Binningen, Switzerland
- Other name: Rudolf Walter
- Occupations: Comedian, actor, radio personality
- Years active: 1941–1990
- Spouse: Irène Camarius (Marthe Irène Liechti)

Rudolf "Ruedi" Walter (born Hans Rudolf Häfeli, 10 December 1916 – 16 June 1990) was a Swiss comedian, actor and radio personality usually starring in Swiss German-language cinema and television and stage productions.

== Early life and education ==
Born in Solothurn to Pauline née Furter and Rudolf, Hans Rudolf Häfeli's family moved from Solothurn to Basel in 1921. There he attended primary school, college for mathematics and natural sciences (Mathematisch-Naturwissenschaftliches Gymnasium) and business school where he graduated at the Maturität level. Still in Basel, Walter began an apprenticeship at a company for bakery and confectionery supplies that went bankrupt, and assumably in 1937 he moved to France, where he attended lessons at the Sorbonne and language lessons in Paris. He worked as a volunteer and later as an administrator in London at the Twining-Crossfield tea company. In 1939 Walter returned to Switzerland where he initially was hired as an employee of the advertising department of the Maggi company in Kemptthal (and end of 1940 in Basel). In August 1939 Ruedi Walter was drafted on occasion of the mobilization of the Swiss Army to perform military service during World War II.

== Theater, television and film ==
Walter in Die kleine Niederdorfoper (1956)

Trained by Eva Bernoulli and Margit von Tolnai and at the Basel conservatory, from 1941 Ruedi Walter and his sister Gertrud Heffler, worked as side jobs in small roles at Stadttheater Basel. From 1943 to 1946 Walter played in Alfred Rasser's Cabaret Cactus in Basel, among others in Rasser's productions "HD soldier Läppli" and "Democrat Läppli". In 1944 he joined the Swiss soldiers stage Bäretatze, and from 1948 to 1950 he was a member of the Cabaret Cornichon ensemble in Zürich. There he met Margrit Rainer, with whom he first appeared as cabaret duo in 1951, then as a "Ehepaar Ehrsam" in the popular satirical radio program "Spalebärg 77a" (1955–1965, filmed in 1957, in 1962 as a musical) and in numerous popular dialect plays and farces. Walter and Rainer were during thirty years probably the most popular entertainment duo in Switzerland. At the Schauspielhaus Zürich, they had great success in "Die Kleine Niederdorf-Oper" (1951 and 1959) and in 1954 in "Der schwarze Hecht". Great touring successes were among others the dialect adaption of Arthur Lovegrove's "Goodnight, Mrs. Puffin!" in 1969, in 1977 "D'Mueter wott nur s'Bescht", and in 1980 "Potz Millione", both directed by Rainer's spouse Inigo Gallo. At Schauspielhaus Walter played among others, in 1956 the blind eunuch Loby in the premiere of Friedrich Dürrenmatt's play Der Besuch der alten Dame (The Visit of the Old Lady), and in 1984 the title role in the premiere of "Dr neu Noah". In addition, Walter worked from 1969 to 1985 under the direction of Jörg Schneider in several children's fairy tales and musicals at the Bernhard-Theater Zürich, where in 1980 Walter played alongside Jörg Schneider in the Swiss German adaption Warte uf de Godot (Waiting For Godot). After Margrith Rainer's death, Walter toured from 1983 to 1985 with "Drei Männer im Schnee" and in Mary Chase's "My Fründ Hanspi" (Swiss German version of Harvey).

Ruedi Walter was a popular actor who played adorable-smart roles, shaping the hearts of his audience. He sat always for professional dialect theater and appeared in numerous vernacular versions of modern dramas, including as Karl Knie in Jörg Schneider's dialect edition of Carl Zuckmayer's "Katharina Knie" in 1985 in a circus tent at Zürichhorn, and in the title roles of television adaption of Molière's The Miser and The Imaginary Invalid. Walter embodied numerous other roles in film and television, and in various recordings of Swiss German language farces.

== Personal life ==
Walter was a citizen of the municipality of Dübendorf in the Canton of Zürich where he lived in his late years, and citizen of Seengen in the Canton of Aargau. Irène Camarius, a Swiss actress born as Marthe Irène Liechti, and Walter married in 1962. They had two children, and lived in Gockhausen, a locality of Dübendorf.

== Death and legacy ==
Until his death Walter stood on the stage and on the movies, though his eyesight greatly subsided. He died unexpectedly on complications after a knee surgery: Ruedi Walter rests at the cemetery of Buch am Irchel.

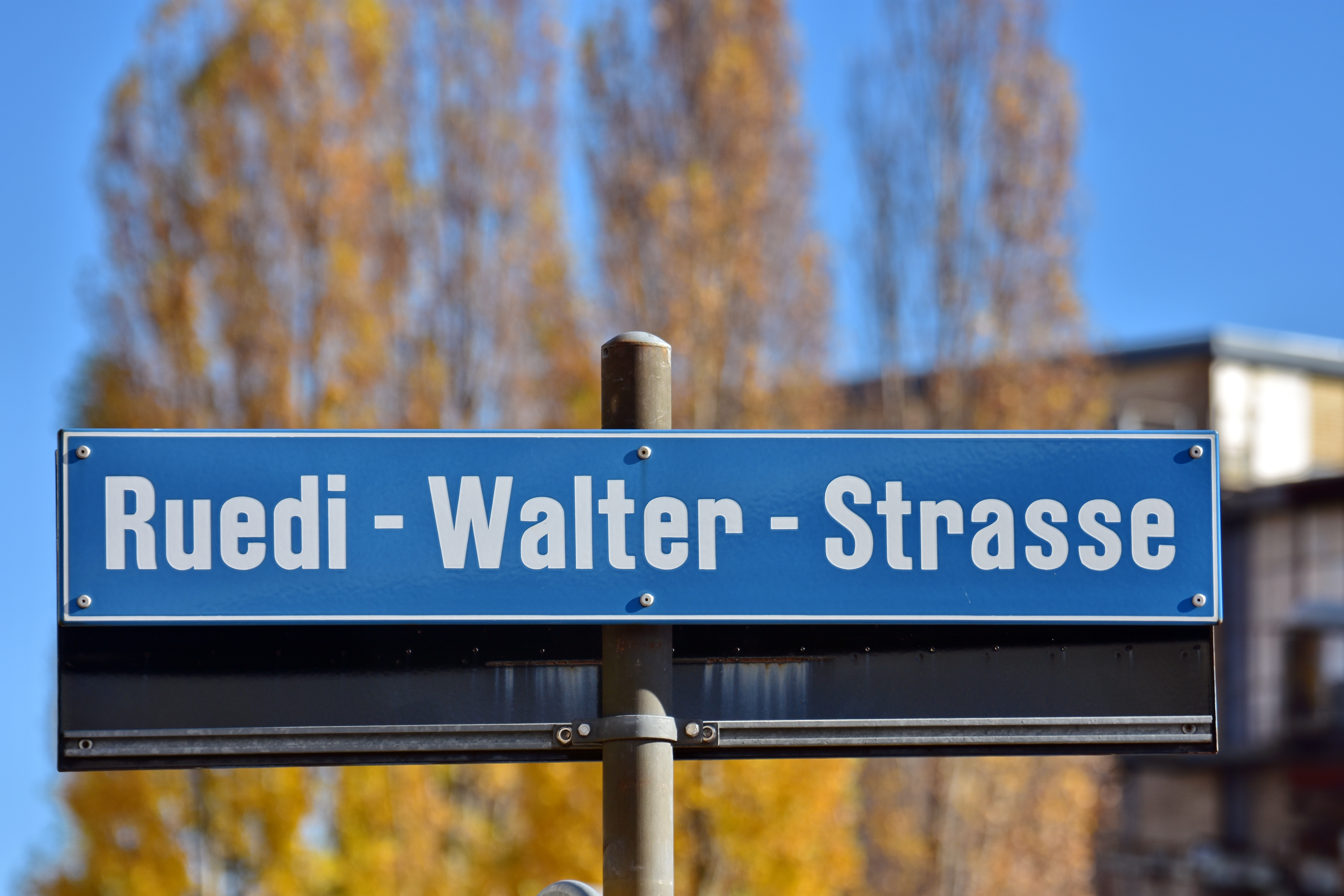
Ruedi-Walter-Strasse in Zürich-Oerlikon

The appreciative designation Volksschauspieler used by the Swiss press, remained for years without a comment by Ruedi Walter. Shortly before he died, Walter said: The term takes me proud, because I feel accepted by the people as one of them. Ruedi-Walter-Strasse in Zürich-Oerlikon was named after the popular actor. Walter was a very good actor, probably one of the best that Switzerland ever had.

== Filmography ==
- 1953: The Venus of Tivoli – Hunziker
- 1956: Polizischt Wäckerli – Fritz Hoffmann aka Bindschädler
- 1956: Oberstadtgass – Herr Rüttimann
- 1956: Besuch der Alten Dame – Loby
- 1957: Taxichauffeur Bänz – Meier
- 1957: Der 10. Mai
- 1958: Zum goldenen Ochsen – Betrunkener Gast
- 1958: Die Käserei in der Vehfreude – Peterli / Peter
- 1959: Hinter den sieben Gleisen – Clown
- 1960-1962: Anne Bäbi Jowäger (part 1, 2) – Hansli Jowäger
- 1960: Der Teufel hat gut lachen – Clown
- 1961: The Marriage of Mr. Mississippi – McGoy
- 1961: Demokrat Läppli – Fritz Myslin
- 1962: Der 42. Himmel – Alfons Baggenstoss
- 1964: Geld und Geist – Kellerjoggi
- 1968: Unruhige Töchter – Regisseur
- 1968: Die sechs Kummerbuben – Bänz
- 1968: Beyond Control
- 1969: Ich betone oben ohne – Das Go Go Girl vom Blow Up – Kommissar Hummel
- 1970: Pfarrer Iseli – Pfarrer Iseli
- 1971: Der Kapitän – Friedrich Haas
- 1973: The Sibyl Cipher
- 1978: Die kleine Niederdorfoper (Television broadcast of the play)
- 1984: Der Besuch der alten Dame (TV Movie) – Koby
- 1988: Klassezämekunft – Jack Lutz
- 1990: Bingo – Sturzi (final film role)

== Awards ==
- 1978: Prix Walo
- 1984: Hans Reinhart-Ring
- 1986: Prix Walo Publikumsliebling

== Literature ==
- Ernst Reinhardt: Ruedi Walter. Spuren eines Schauspielerlebens. Friedrich Reinhardt Verlag, Basel 1984, ISBN 3-7245-0549-3.
