= List of University of St. Gallen people =

The list of University of St. Gallen people includes notable students, graduates, professors, and administrators affiliated with the University of St. Gallen.

== Notable alumni ==
=== Business ===
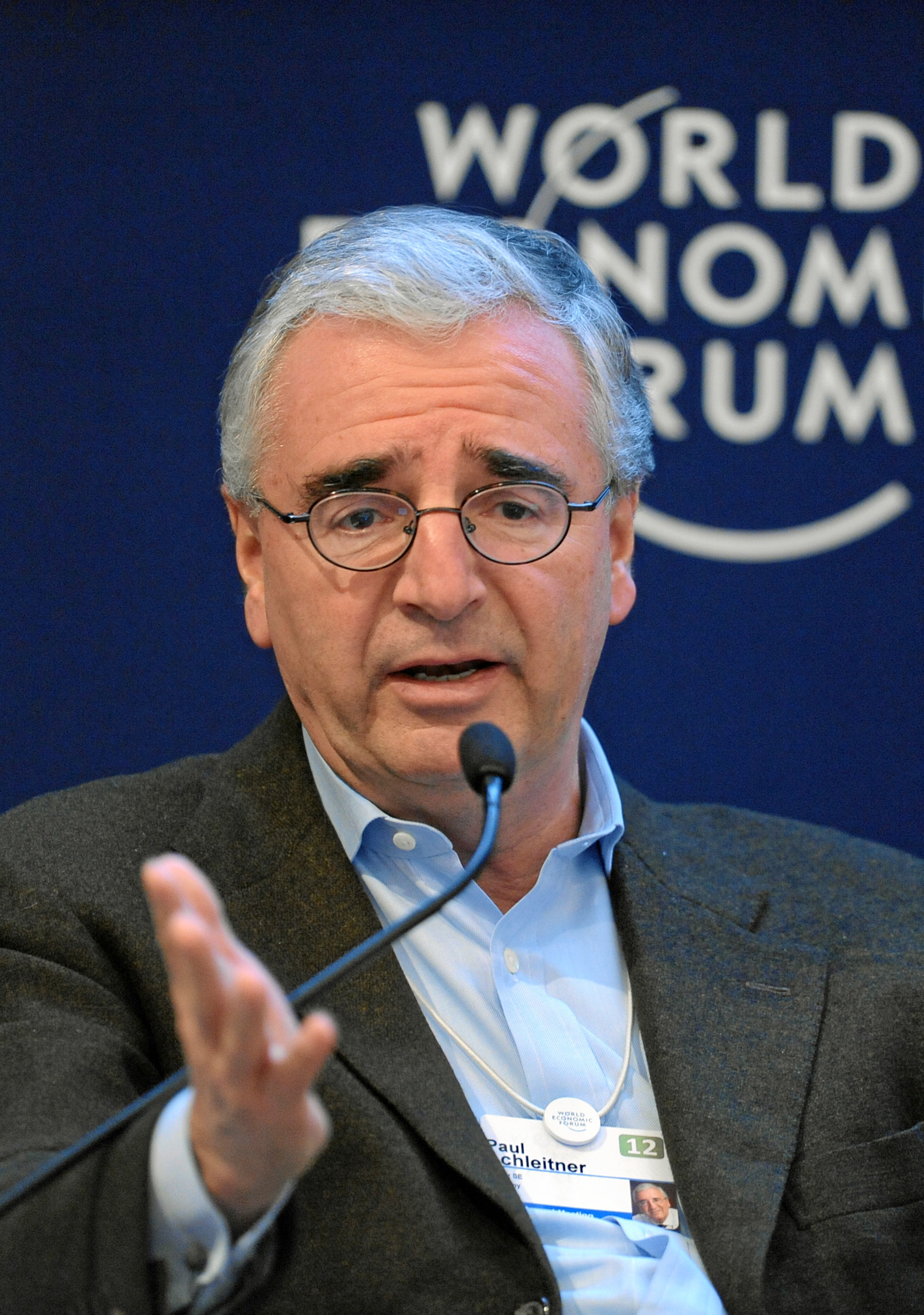
Paul Achleitner

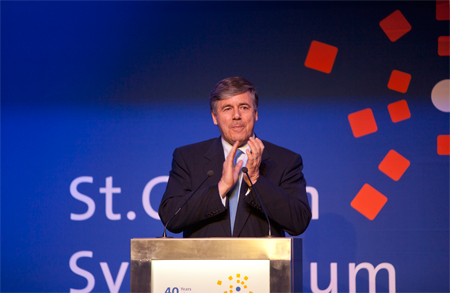
Josef Ackermann

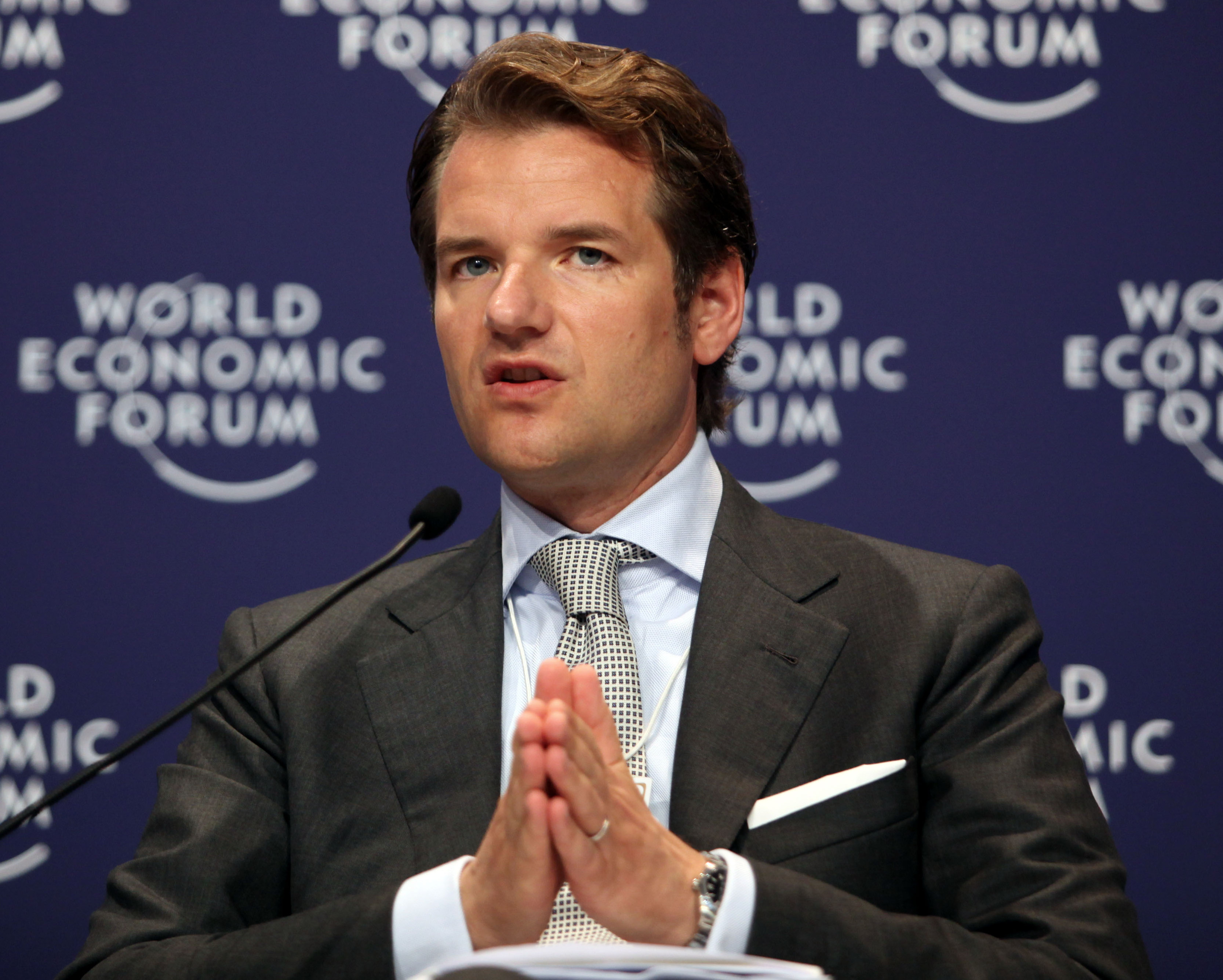
Peer M. Schatz

Name	Degree/Year	Comments	Reference
Paul Achleitner	Dr. oec. 1985	Chairman, Deutsche Bank, 2012–2022; board member, Allianz SE, 2000–2012; board member, Bayer, 2002–2026	
Josef Ackermann	Dr. oec. 1977	CEO, Deutsche Bank, 2002–2012; chairman, Zurich Insurance Group, 2012–2013; chairman, Institute of International Finance, 2003–2012; Member, Group of Thirty	
Martin Blessing	1987	CEO, Commerzbank	
Thomas Buberl	Dr. oec. 2001	CEO, Axa	
Rolf Dobelli	Dr. 1995	Co-founder and chairman, getAbstract	
Peter Fankhauser	Dr. 1989	CEO, Thomas Cook Group, 2014–2019	
Rainer-Marc Frey	lic. oec. 1986	Entrepreneur and investor	
Patrik Gisel	Dr. 1992	CEO, Raiffeisen Bank	
Karl-Erivan Haub	Lic. oec. 1983	CEO, Tengelmann Group	
Nick Hayek, Jr.	–	CEO, Swatch Group	
Thomas Hesse	Dr.	Board member, Bertelsmann	
Konrad Hilbers	Dr. oec.	CEO, Napster, 2001–2002; CEO, Primondo, 2007–2008	
André Hoffmann	Economics	Vice chairman, F. Hoffmann-La Roche AG	
Ola Källenius	CEMS MIM 1993	CEO, Daimler AG, 2019-	
Georges Kern	Unknown	CEO, IWC	
Walter Kielholz	Lic. oec. 1976	Honorary Chairman, Swiss Re; chairman, Swiss Re, 2009–2021; chairman, Credit Suisse, 2003–2009	
Ulrich Körner	Lic. oec. 1988, Dr. 1993	COO, UBS	
Adrian Künzi	Dr. oec.	CEO, Notenstein Privatbank, 2012–	
Axel Lehmann	Lic.oec. 1984, Dr. 1989, Habil. 1996	Chairman Credit Suisse, 2022-	
Princess Adelheid of Liechtenstein	2002	Non-Executive Director of LGT Wealth Management	
Harald Link	1978	CEO, B.Grimm; Billionaire	
Count Jakob Lambsdorff	CEMS	CEO, Alba W&H Smart City, 2019–	
Magdalena Martullo-Blocher	Lic. oec.	CEO, Ems-Chemie	
Fredmund Malik	Dr. 1974	Founder and chairman, Malik Management Zentrum St. Gallen	
Dirk Markus	Dr. oec.	Co-founder and chairman, Aurelius	
Julius Meinl V	Unknown	Chairman, Meinl Bank	
Markus Miele	Dr.	Managing director, Miele	
Philipp Navratil	Lic.oec.	CEO, Nestlé	
Daniel Nordmann	E.M.B.A.	CEO, SBB Cargo, 2000–2007	
Axel Oberwelland		German billionaire heir and businessman; owner of August Storck	
Roberto Paganoni	Dr.oec.	CEO, LGT Capital Partners AG	
Olivier de Perregaux	lic.oec. 1987	CEO, LGT Private Banking AG	
Nicolas Pictet	Lic.oec., Dr. oec.	Member of the board of directors and former Senior Partner, Pictet Group	
Ivan Pictet	MBA	former Senior Partner, Pictet Group	
Michael Pieper	Lic. oec.	Owner, Franke Holding AG	
Renaud de Planta	Lic. oec., Dr.oec. 1989	Member of the board of directors and former Senior Partner, Pictet Group; member of the council, Swiss National Bank	
Christel Rendu de Lint	Lic.oec.	Co-CEO, Vontobel	
Michael Ringier	–	Chairman, Ringier AG	
Moritz Runge	M.A. HSG	Global CEO, Pasta & Red Sauce Brands	
Georg Schaeffler	Lic. oec. 1990	Owner, Schaeffler Group (together with Maria-Elisabeth Schaeffler)	
Peer M. Schatz	M.A. 1989	CEO, Qiagen	
Roger Schawinski	Dr. oec.	CEO, Sat. 1, 2003–2006	
Ulf Mark Schneider	Lic. oec. 1988, Dr. 1992	Former CEO, Nestlé; former CEO, Fresenius SE	
Reinhard Schneider	Lic. oec.	Managing director, Werner & Mertz	
Stefan Schmittmann	Lic. oec. 1981, Dr. oec. 1986	Chairman, Commerzbank	
Georg Schubiger	Lic.oec.	Co-CEO, Vontobel	
Zeno Staub	Dr.oec. 1997	Member of the Board of Directors, former CEO 2011–2023, Vontobel	
Margret Suckale	E.M.B.L. 1977	Board member, BASF	
Theodor Weimer	–	CEO, Deutsche Börse, 2017–	
Alex Widmer	Dr. oec. 1985	CEO, Julius Baer Group, 2007–2008	
Kristian Widmer	E.M.B.A.	CEO, Condor Films	
Peter Wuffli	1981, Dr. 1984	CEO, UBS, 2003–2007	

=== Politics, law and society ===
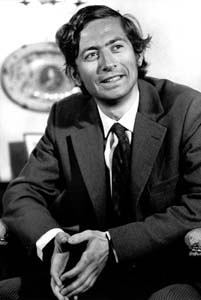
Prince Hans-Adam II

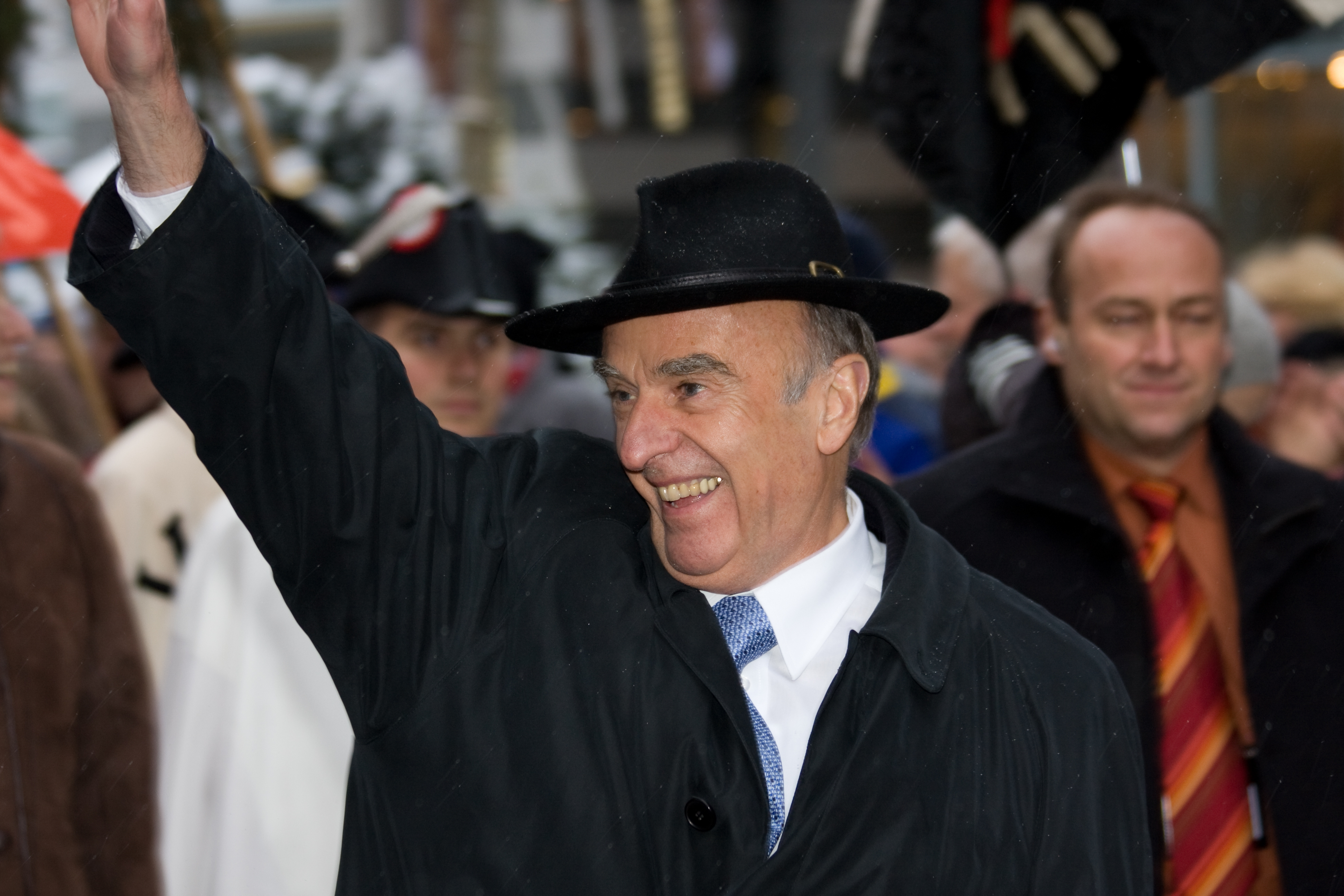
Hans-Rudolf Merz

Name	Degree/Year	Comments	Reference
Gerald Asamoah	Certificate	Ghanaian-born German former footballer	
Christoffel Brändli	Mag. oec. 1971	Swiss politician and former President of the Swiss Council of States	
Rolf Dobelli	Dr. oec. 1995	Novelist, bestselling non-fiction author and founder of World.minds	
Prince Hans-Adam II	Lic. oec. 1969	Prince of Liechtenstein, Sovereign Monarch and Head of State of Liechtenstein	
Adrian Hasler	Lic. oec.	Prime Minister of Liechtenstein, 2013–2017	
Daniel Jositsch	Prof. Dr. iur.	Daniel Jositsch, law professor and SP politician	
Othmar Karas	M.B.L. 1997	Austrian politician and Member of the European Parliament	
Arnold Koller	Lic. oec. 1957	President of the Swiss Confederation, 1990 and 1997	
Elmar Ledergerber	Dr. oec. 1979	Mayor of Zurich, 2002–2009	
Urs Lehmann	Lic. oec. 2001	Former World Champion alpine skier	
Prince Lorenz of Belgium	Unknown	Member of the Belgian royal family	
Hans-Rudolf Merz	Dr. rer. publ. 1971	Bundesrat, Federal Council of Switzerland, 2003–2010	
Hans A. Pestalozzi	Unknown	Swiss manager, social critic, and author	
Yves Rüedi	Dr. iur. 2009	Judge of the Federal Supreme Court of Switzerland	
Oswald Sigg	Unknown	Vice-Chancellor of Switzerland and spokesman of the Swiss Federal Council, 2005–2009	
Peter Spuhler		Swiss politician and member of the Swiss National Council; CEO, Stadler Rail	
Hanny Thalmann	Dr. 1943	Member of the National Council of Switzerland, 1971–1979	
Klaus Tschütscher	Lic. iur. 1993, Dr. iur. 1996	Prime Minister of Liechtenstein, 2009–2013	
Andreas Zünd	Unknown	Judge at the European Court of Human Rights	
Werner Zdouc	Dr. iur. 2002	Director of the WTO Appellate Body Secretariat, 2006–2020	
Marco Zwyssig	Lic. oec. 1997	Former player for the Swiss national football team	

=== Academics ===
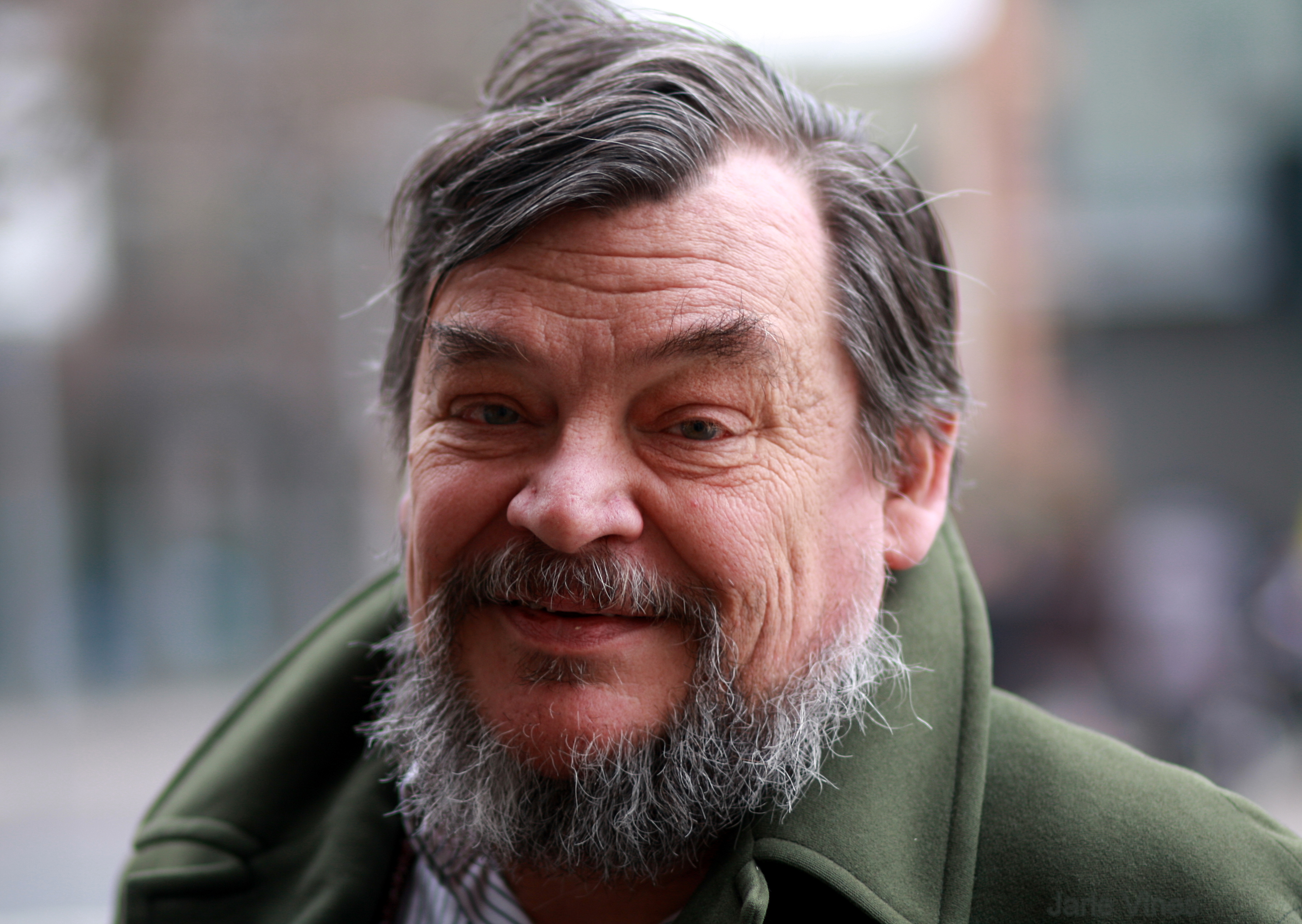
Erik S. Reinert

Name	Degree/Year	Comments	Reference
Ann-Kristin Achleitner	Dr. oec. 1991, Dr. iur. 1992	Professor of Finance, Technical University of Munich	
David Dorn	Dr. oec. 2009	Professor of Economics, University of Zurich	
Lars Feld	Dr. oec. 1999	Professor of Economics, University of Freiburg; Member, German Council of Economic Experts	
Christopher Kummer	lic. oec. HSG 1999	Professor of Finance, Hult International Business School	
Erik S. Reinert	Economics	Professor of Economics, Tallinn University of Technology	

== Notable faculty (permanent) ==
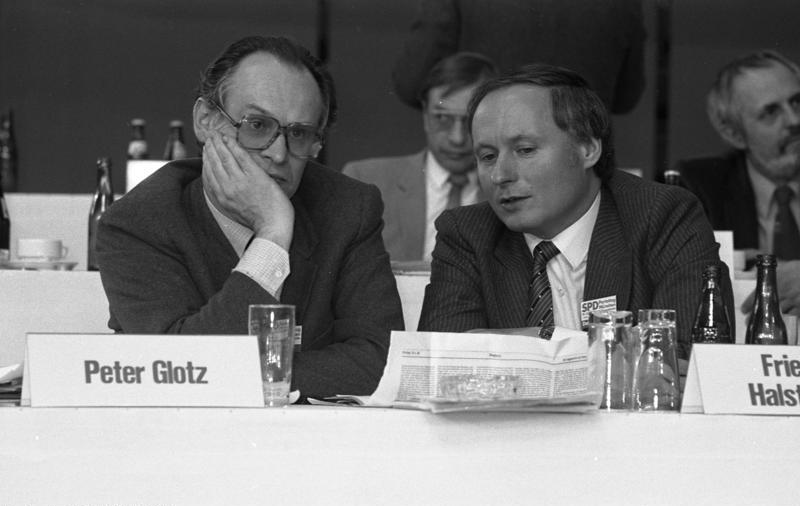
Peter Glotz

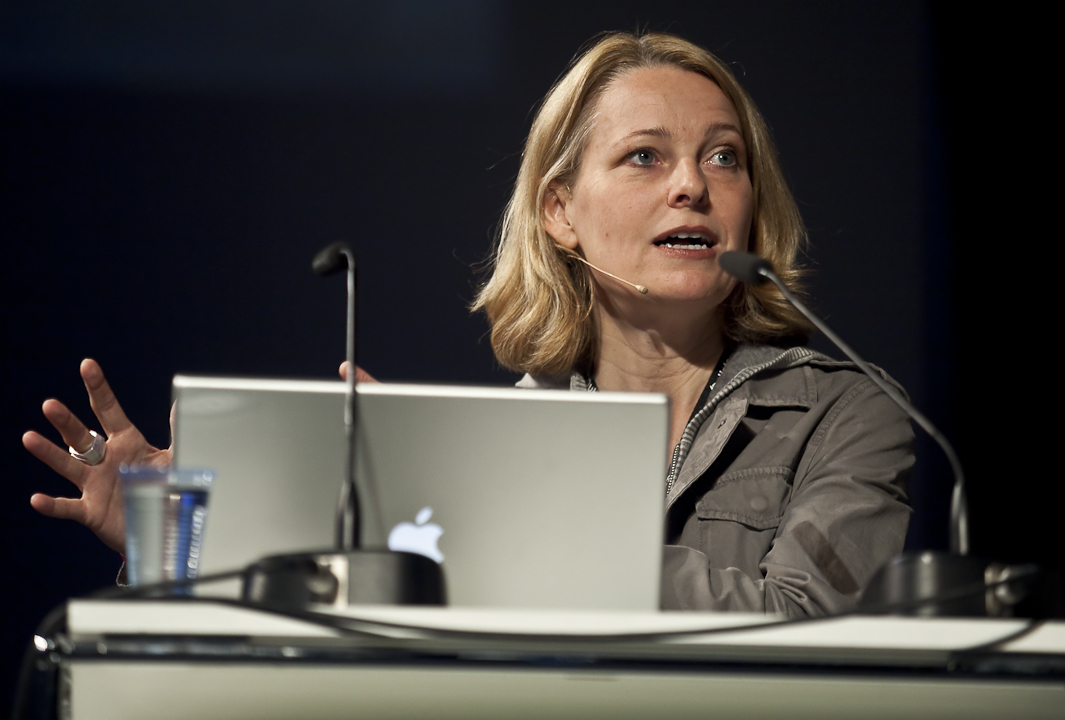
Miriam Meckel

Name	Tenure	Comments	Reference
Anne van Aaken	2012–2018	Professor of Law and Economics	
Carl Baudenbacher	1987–present	Professor of Law; President, EFTA Court	
Simon Gächter	2000–2005	Professor of Economics; now at University of Nottingham	
Peter Glotz	2000–2005	Permanent Guest Professor for Media and Society	
Walter Hunziker	Unknown	Professor of Tourism and co-founder of the Institut International de Glion	
Wladimir Klitschko	2016–	Lecturer; Ukrainian professional boxer and entrepreneur	
Juliane Kokott	1999–2003	Professor of Law; now Advocate General, Court of Justice of the European Union	
Arnold Koller	1972-1986	Professor of Law; former President of the Swiss Confederation	
Margrith Bigler-Eggenberger		Lecturer and Honorary Doctorate, first woman in the Federal Supreme Court	
Wilhelm Krelle	1956–1958	Professor of Economics; later at University of Bonn	
Georg von Krogh	1994–2006	Professor of Management; now at ETH Zurich	
Axel Lehmann		Professor of Management; chairman, Credit Suisse	
Miriam Meckel	2005–present	Professor for Corporate Communication	
Lucia A. Reisch	Unknown	Guest Lecturer; Professor of Economics, Copenhagen Business School	
Ota Šik	1970–1990	Professor of Economics and one of the key figures in the Prague Spring	
Uwe Sunde	2008–2012	Professor of Economics	
Frederic Vester	1989–1991	Professor of Applied Economics; member of the Club of Rome	

== Notable honorary doctorate recipients ==
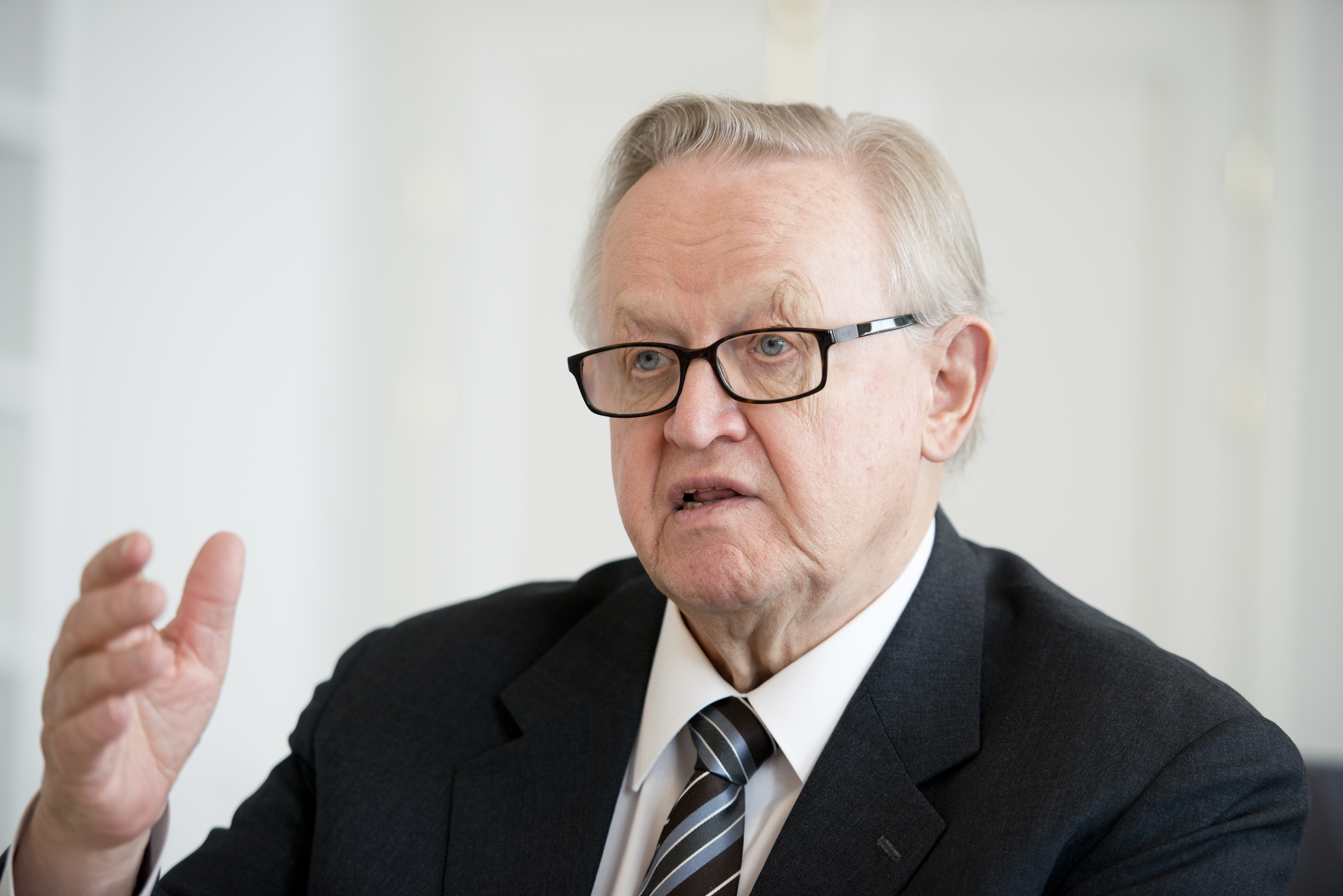
Martti Ahtisaari

Name	Field/Year	Comments	Reference
Martti Ahtisaari	Political Science, 2007	President of Finland, 1994–2000; 2008 Nobel laureate	
Joshua Angrist	Economics, 2007	Professor of Economics, Massachusetts Institute of Technology	
Lans Bovenberg	Economics, 2010	Professor of Economics, Tilburg University	
John H. Cochrane	Economics, 2014	Professor of Economics, University of Chicago Booth School of Business	
Robert H. Frank	Economics, 2008	Professor of Economics, Cornell University	
Gene Grossman	Economics, 2009	Professor of Economics, Princeton University	
Surin Pitsuwan	Political Science, 2011	Secretary-General, Association of Southeast Asian Nations, 2008–2012	
Oliver E. Williamson	Economics, 1987	Professor of Economics, UC Berkeley; 2009 Nobel laureate	
