= University of St. Gallen =

Swiss university

- Universität St. Gallen
- Other name: HSG
- Motto: From insight to impact
- Type: Public
- Established: May 25, 1898; 128 years ago
- Affiliations: CEMS, APSIA, EQUIS, AACSB, AMBA
- Budget: CHF 313.1 million (2025)
- President: Manuel Ammann
- Faculty: 490 professors (2025); 73 assistant professors (2019)
- Administrative staff: 3,335
- Students: 9,992 (2025)
- Undergraduates: 5,600 (2025)
- Postgraduates: 3,788 (2025)
- Doctoral students: 560 (2025)
- Other students: 44 (2025)
- Location: St. Gallen, Canton of St. Gallen, Switzerland; 47°25′54″N 9°22′29″E
- Campus: Urban (Rosenberg hill)
- Newspapers: HSG Focus, Prisma
- Colors: Green, White and Black
- Website: www.unisg.ch

The University of St. Gallen (HSG) (German: Universität St. Gallen) is a public research university located in St. Gallen, Switzerland, that specialises in business administration, economics, law, international affairs, and computer science. It was established in 1898. It consistently ranks as one of the best business schools in Europe. In 2022, it had 9,590 students, of which 3,757 were master's students and 584 were doctoral students.

Although it is one of Switzerland's smallest universities, HSG has Switzerland's largest faculty for business administration. It has produced more billionaires in Europe than any other European university. It is a member of the CEMS and APSIA and is EQUIS, AACSB and AMBA accredited (triple crown accreditation). Its campus is listed as a Swiss heritage site of national significance. The university is owned by the canton of St. Gallen.

== History ==
=== 19th and 20th centuries ===
In May 1898, the Cantonal Parliament of St. Gallen established an academy for trade, commerce and administration in St. Gallen. The actual founding father is considered to be Theodor Curti, then the head of the Department of Economic Affairs of the Canton of St. Gallen. The business academy began offering lectures in 1899, making it one of the earliest institutions of its kind worldwide. From 1911 onward, it operated under the name Handels-Hochschule. In 1938, the former private-law foundation became a public institution, and in 1939, it was granted the right to confer doctoral degrees.

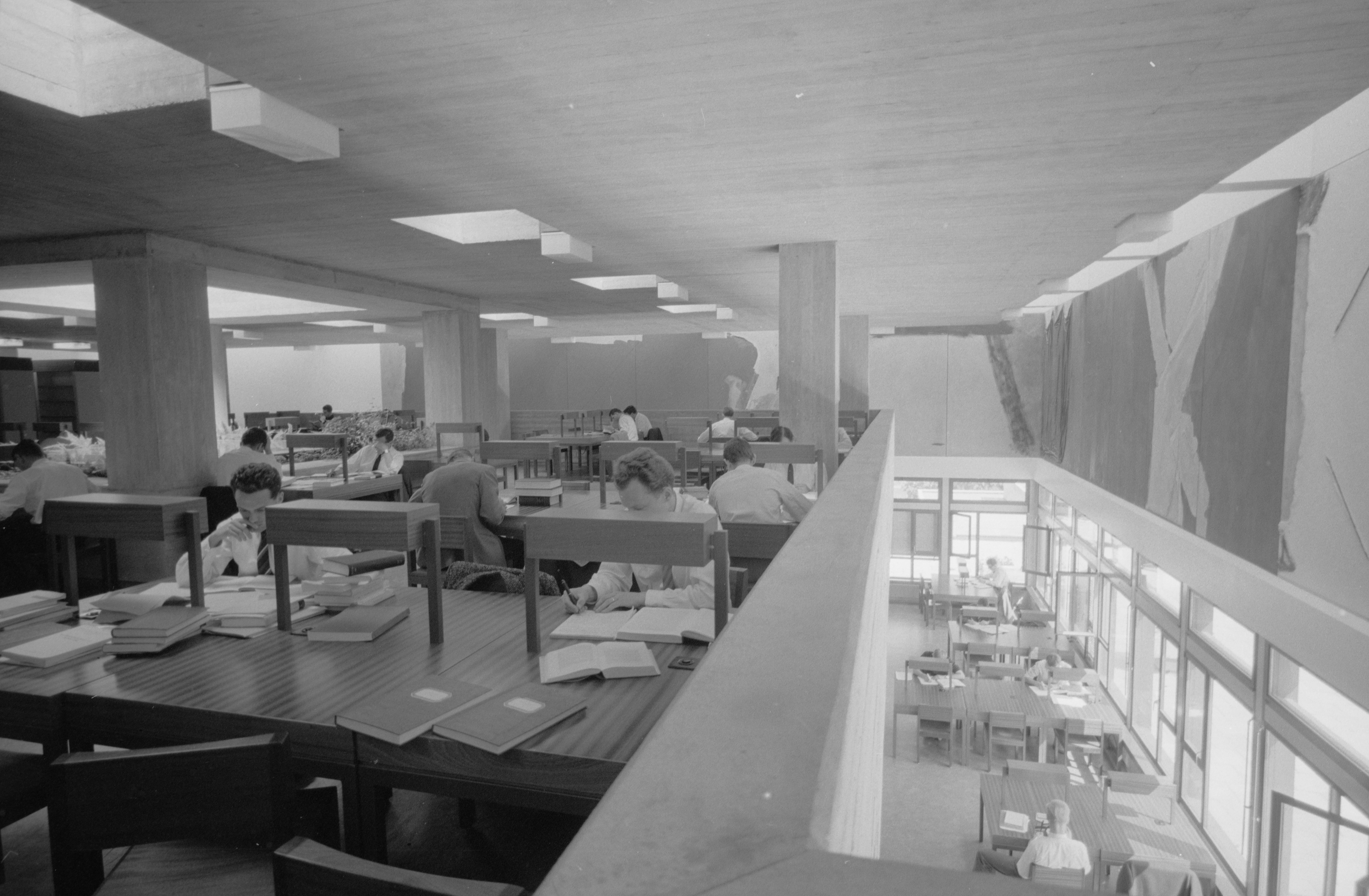
The University of St. Gallen in 1963, with art works by Antoni Tàpies

In 1963, the university moved to new buildings and changed its name to Hochschule für Wirtschafts- und Sozialwissenschaften. The new buildings were planned for 900 students, but by the winter term of 1963/64, more than 1150 students were enrolled. With the enaction of the Higher Education Act of 1989, the university was renamed Hochschule St. Gallen für Wirtschafts-, Rechts- und Sozialwissenschaften to reflect its curricula. The university has had its law department since 1978. In 1989, the library building opened, and enrollment had grown to over 3900. In February 1994, the Cantonal Parliament of St. Gallen approved a bill to amend the Higher Education Act, leading to the renaming of the institution as Universität St. Gallen (University of St. Gallen). The acronym HSG remained. In 1995, the school was renamed University of St.Gallen (HSG).

=== Recent history ===
In the winter of 2001/02, the University of St. Gallen started the reorganization of its study programs. Education was classified into bachelor's and master's degrees, making the university Switzerland's pioneer in the Bologna process. In October 2005, the university's Executive School of Management, Technology and Law (ES-HSG) was opened. The financially autonomous Executive School centralizes further educational activities such as MBA and executive MBA programs.

Mid-2005, the people of St. Gallen voted (with 66.4% in favour) to renovate, reorganize and expand the university by 2011. With a budget of about 80m Swiss francs, buildings from the 1960s were renovated, and its infrastructure was updated.

== Campus ==
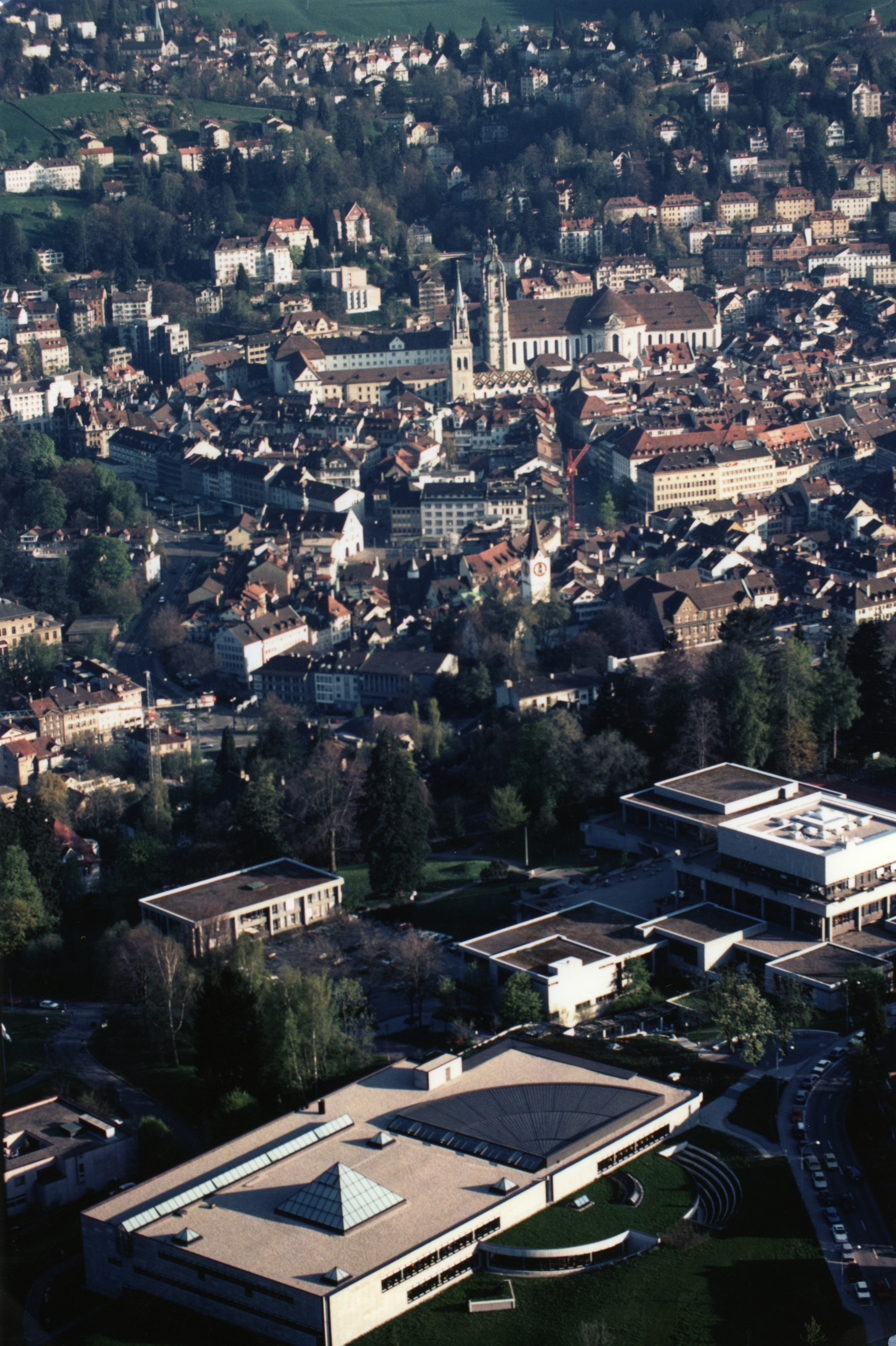
The University of St. Gallen with the Altstadt of St. Gallen and its Abbey of Saint Gall in the background

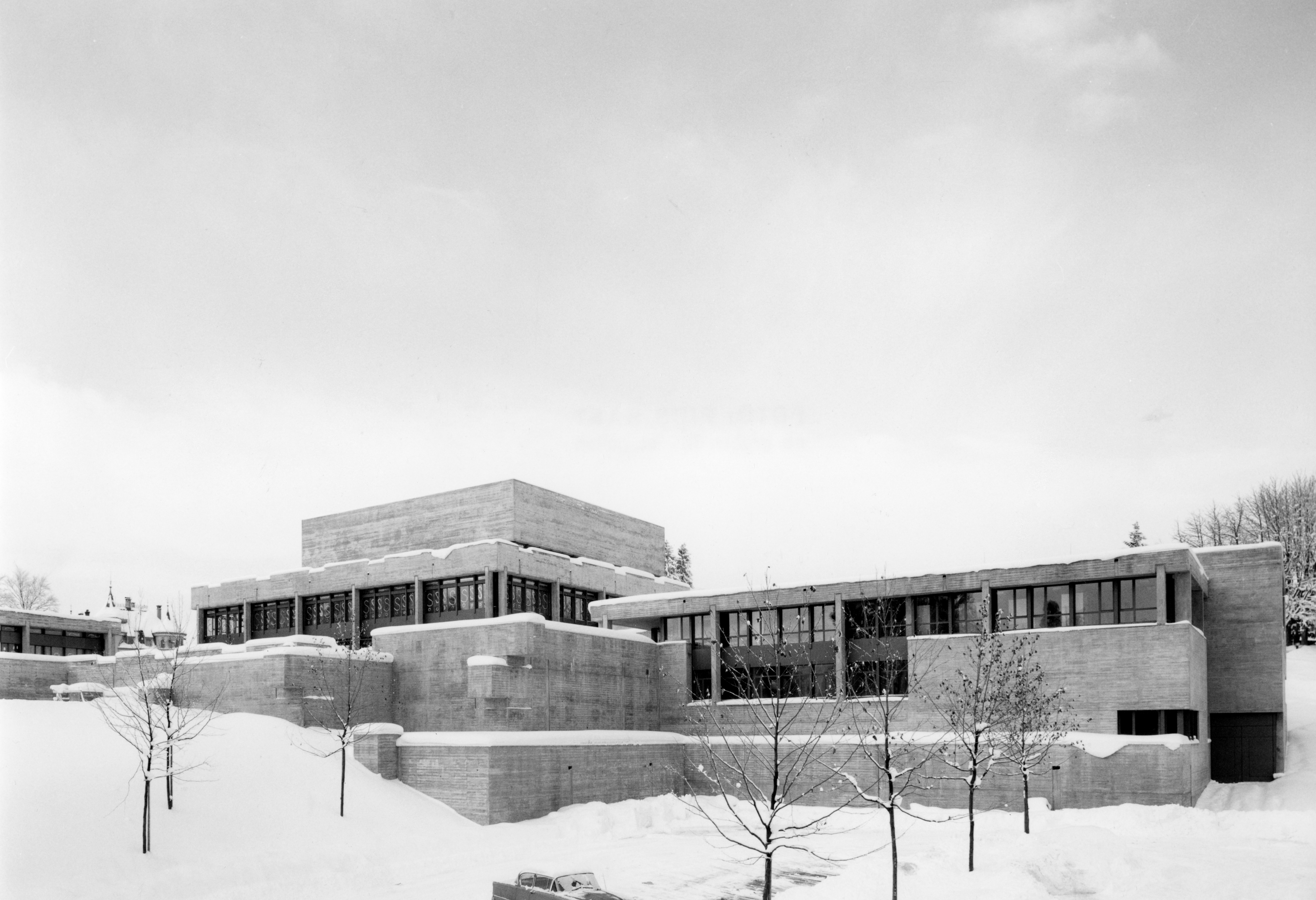
Main Building, designed by Walter Förderer, at the time of opening 1963

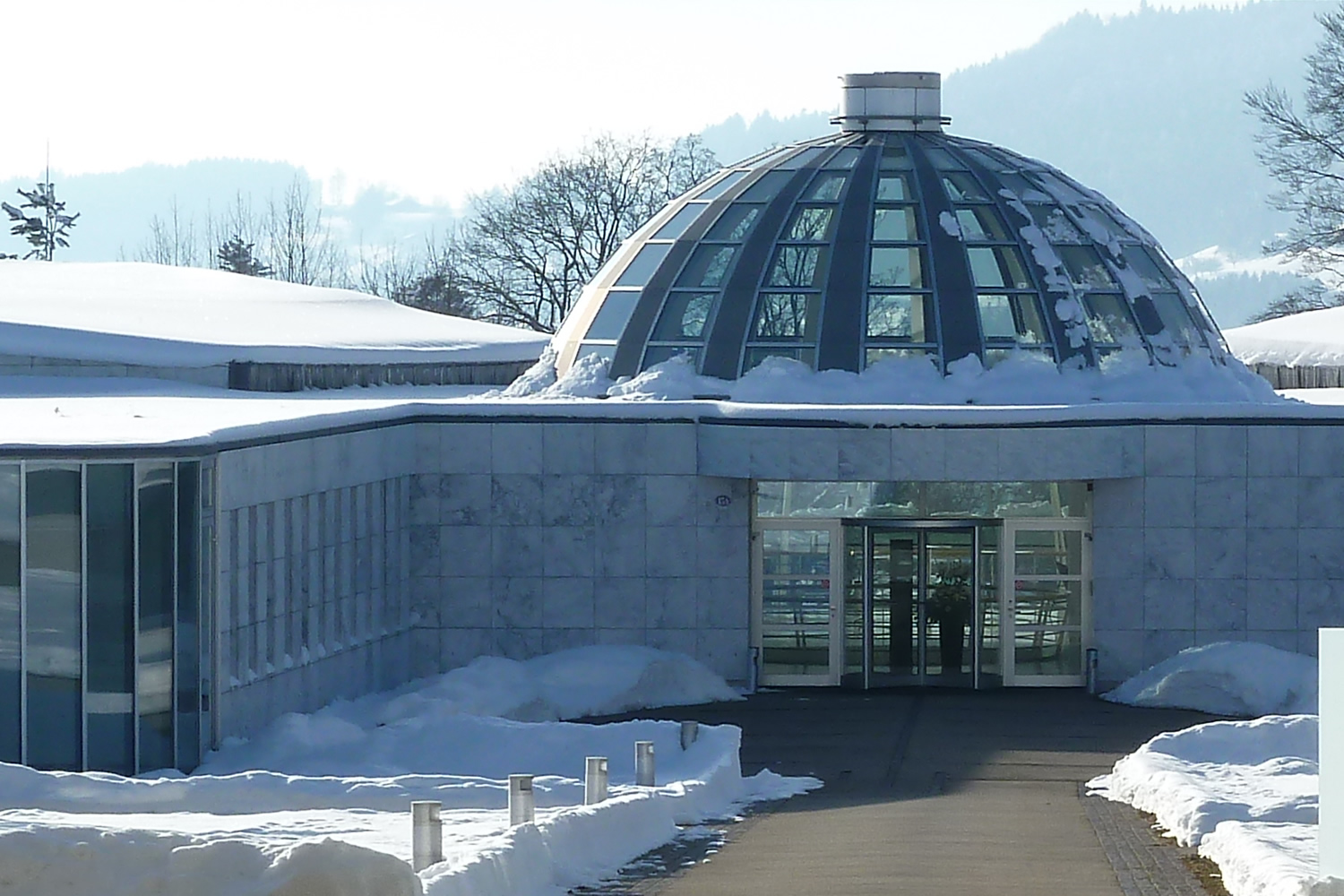
The convention and executive education center opened in 1995

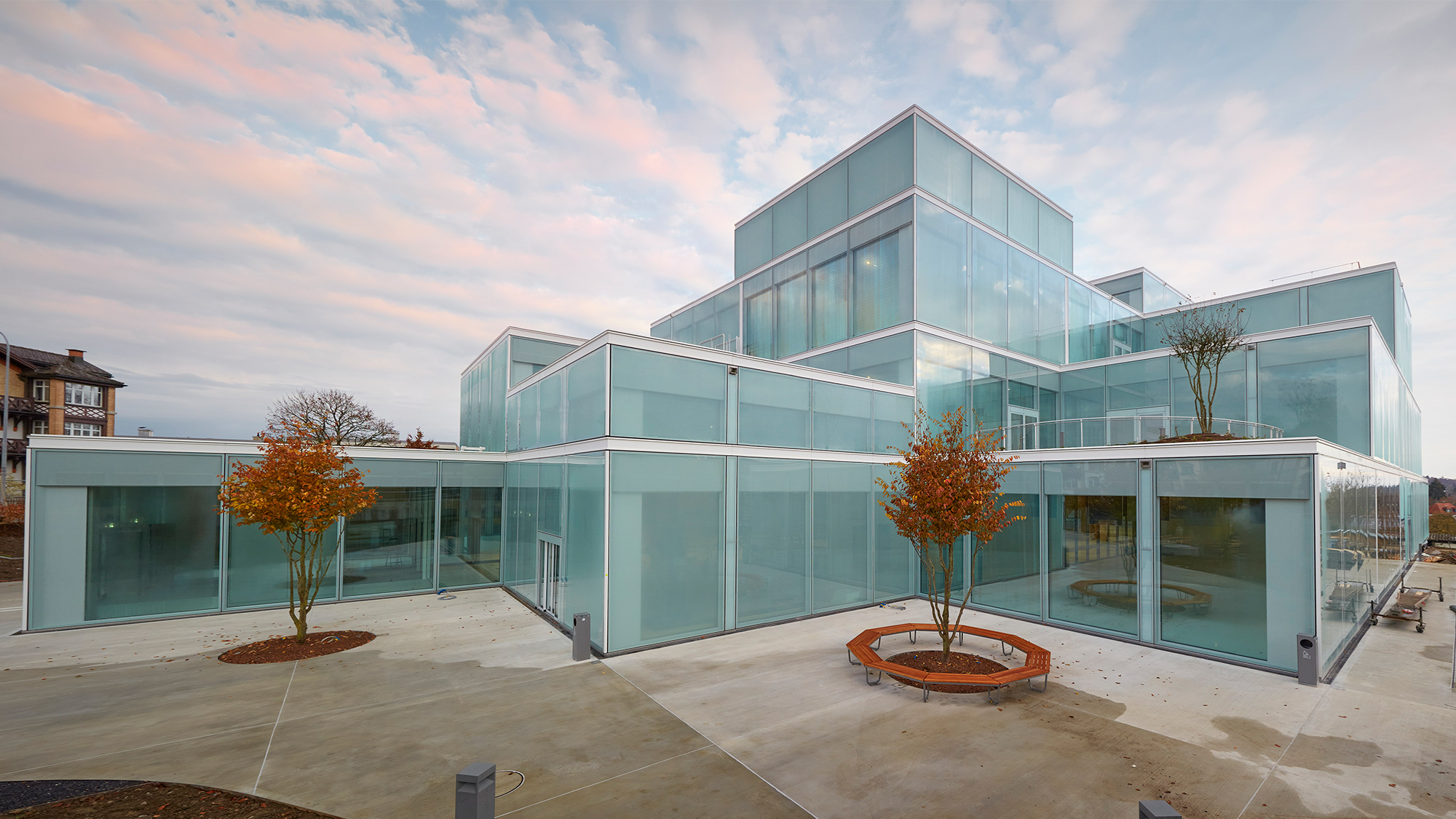
HSG Learning Center "SQUARE" in October 2021

The University of St. Gallen is located atop Rosenberg Hill, overlooking the Altstadt of St. Gallen, with a view of the Alpstein mountain range. The campus is noted for its integration of art and architecture. The area around the university, including the town of St. Gallen at Lake Constance and the Alps, offers facilities for outdoor activities including skiing, hiking, climbing and sailing.

Alberto Giacometti's sculpture in the Main Building of the University of St. Gallen

In the Main Building, designed by Walter Foerderer and regarded worldwide as a significant example of 1960s architecture, art is a major feature of the architecture; whereas in the Library Building of 1989, works of art complement the diversity of architectural forms narratively. There are works by Kemény, Penalba, Arp, Braque, Hajdu, Soniatta, Miró, Calder, Soulages, Giacometti, Tàpies, Coghuf, Otto Müller, Disler, Bill, Josef Felix Müller, Paladino, Richter, and Cucchi.

In 1995, a convention and executive education centre opened a few minutes walk from the main campus. Extended in 2007, it now comprises several plenary halls and 54 business rooms. The university also has international hubs in Singapore, São Paulo and Dornbirn to connect local faculty, students, alumni and companies with its academic activities.

In 2019, the voters of the canton of St. Gallen approved the construction of an additional campus in the city. The new campus will create room for 3,000 additional students and will be opened in 2027.

In February 2022, the new HSG Learning Center "SQUARE" opened on the Rosenberg. It is intended to be an innovative place for thinking and working, enabling new types of learning and interaction between students, faculty and people from the field. The project is being realised by the HSG Foundation and financed entirely through donations. Over 800 donors have supported the HSG Learning Center to date. The project "Open Grid - Choices of Tomorrow" by Sou Fujimoto Architects won the architecture competition in 2018.

== Academics ==
=== Schools, institutes, and research centres ===
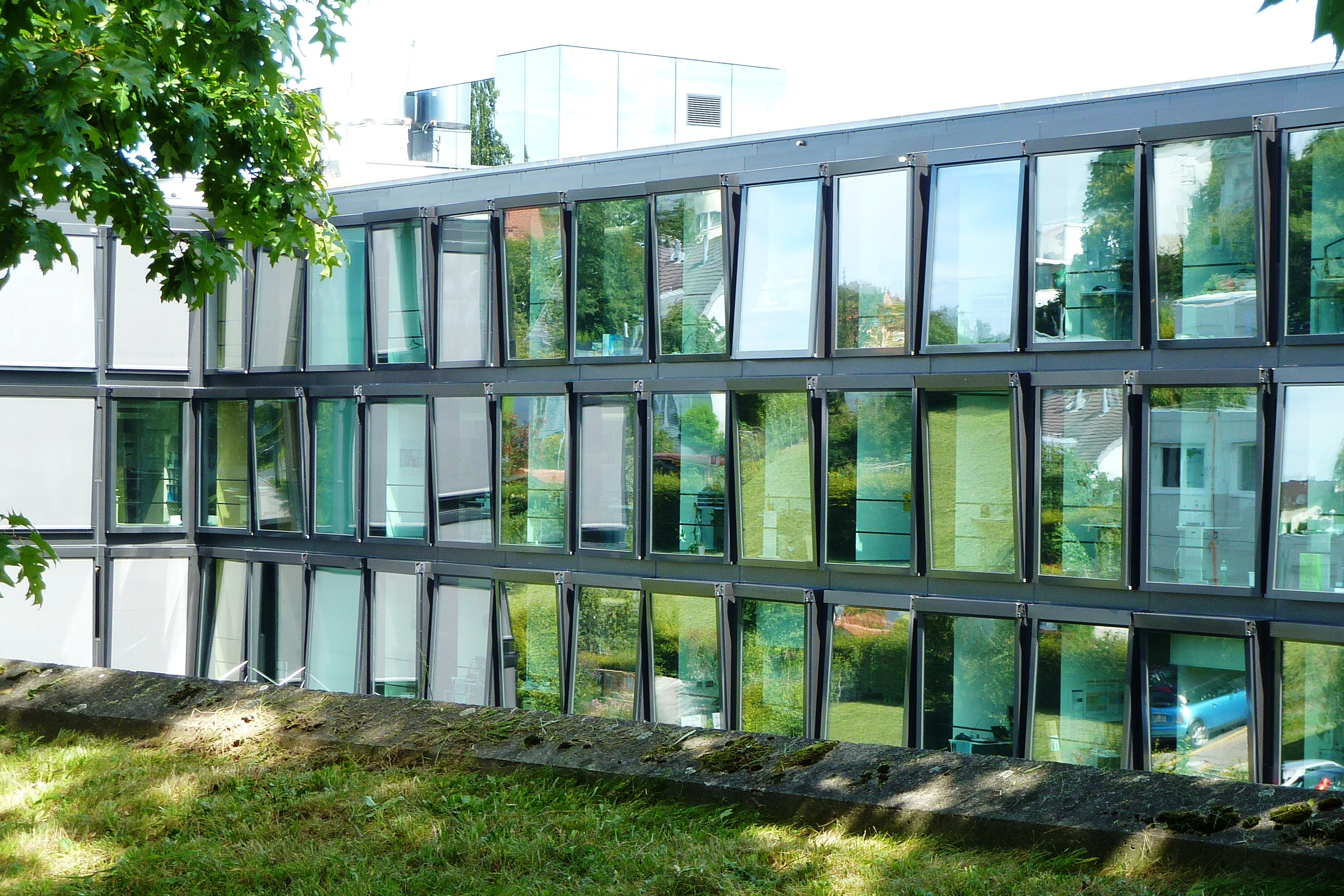
The Central Institute Building, designed by Herzog & de Meuron

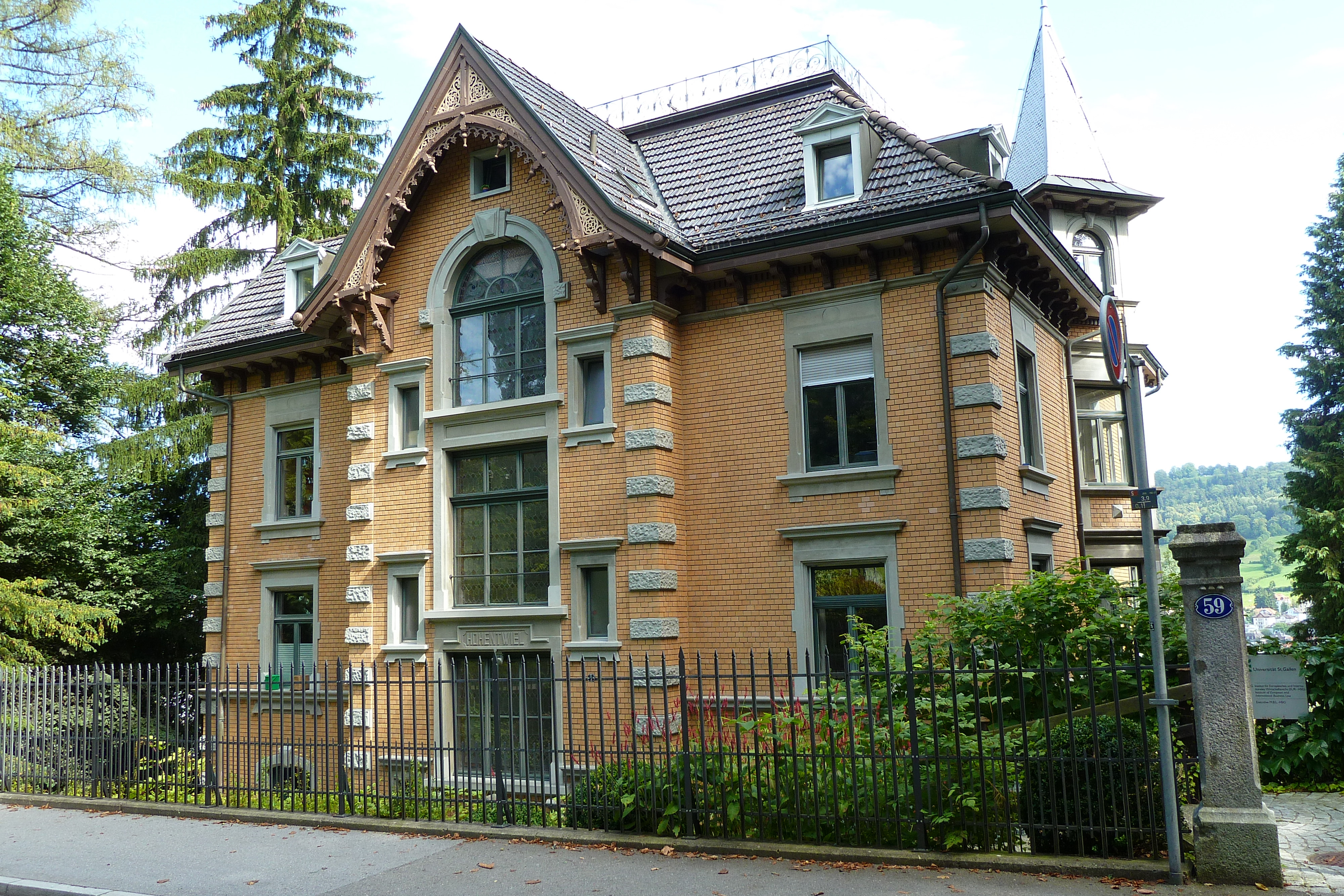
The Institute of European and International Business Law

Following a restructuring in 2011, there are five schools at the University of St. Gallen: the School of Management (SoM-HSG), the School of Finance (SoF-HSG), the Law School (LS-HSG), the School of Economics and Political Science (SEPS-HSG), and the School of Humanities and Social Sciences (SHSS-HSG). Study programs are typically associated with a specific school but are taught jointly by faculty members from several schools. The Executive School of Management, Technology and Law (ES-HSG) plays a special role which has the status of an Institut mit besonderen gesamtuniversitären Aufgaben and which runs the MBA and executive education programs.

The crystallization points of research at the University of St. Gallen are about 40 institutes and research centres, which are an integral part of the university. The directors of the institutes double as professors of the University of St. Gallen. Bringing theory and practice together, the institutes provide important input for teaching at the university and play a significant role in furthering the careers of young academics. 80 tenured professors, 60 assistant professors and senior lecturers, and more than 300 lecturers and 300 assistants, plus distinguished visiting professors cultivate the scientific discourse with the students.

The University of St. Gallen is a member of the European Research Center for Information Systems (ERCIS) and the Auto-ID Labs network.

=== Study programmes ===
A new structure of Studies became operational as of winter 2001/2002. Degrees are now divided into Bachelor, Master, and Doctoral programmes under the Bologna Process. Since 2013, the bachelor's degree programmes have started with an Assessment Year for all students. The Assessment Year in Economics and Law is offered in two separate tracks, with instruction in either German or English. The main difference between the two is that the English track offers an economics specialization that allows for subsequent Bachelor studies in Business Administration, Economics, International Affairs, or Law and Economics. The German track offers an additional option of a specialization in Law for students interested in pursuing Bachelor studies in Law. Many Master's programmes and most Doctoral programmes are taught in English.

Upon successful completion of the Assessment Year, students can then choose one of five majors for their remaining years of study as listed below. It is worth noting that the degrees are very flexible and most students take more than three years to finish their bachelor's degree. The majority of Bachelor students are enrolled in Business Administration. Aside from the University of St. Gallen, only the University of Geneva offers an International Affairs programme within Switzerland. The Master's programmes cover the same range of studies but are more specialised. The Master's programmes typically run from 1.5 to 2 years. Besides the CEMS Master's in International Management, further double degrees may be obtained in cooperation with partner universities such as Bocconi University, ESADE, HEC Paris, INCAE Business School, Nanyang Technological University, The Fletcher School of Law and Diplomacy, Rotterdam School of Management, or Sciences Po Paris.

=== Rankings ===
	2016	2017	2018	2019	2020	2021	2022
FT – European Business School	5th	4th	4th	4th	7th	6th	5th
FT – Master in Management (HSG Program)	1st	1st	1st	1st	1st	1st	
The Economist – Master in Management	-	5th	-	2nd	-		
FT – Master in Management (CEMS Program)	N/A*	9th	9th	8th	13th		
FT – Master in Finance	8th	10th	6th		6th		
FT – Master of Business Administration (MBA)	60th	59th	60th	69th	68th	64th	
The Economist – Master of Business Administration (MBA)	-	-	-	92nd	-	53rd	
FT – Executive Master of Business Administration (EMBA)	46th	45th	55th	44th	47th		
FT – Executive Education – Open	38th	28th	28th	24th	26th		

*In 2016, CEMS refused to take part in the yearly FT Ranking. The programme made its comeback in 2017 at the 9th place.

== Student life ==
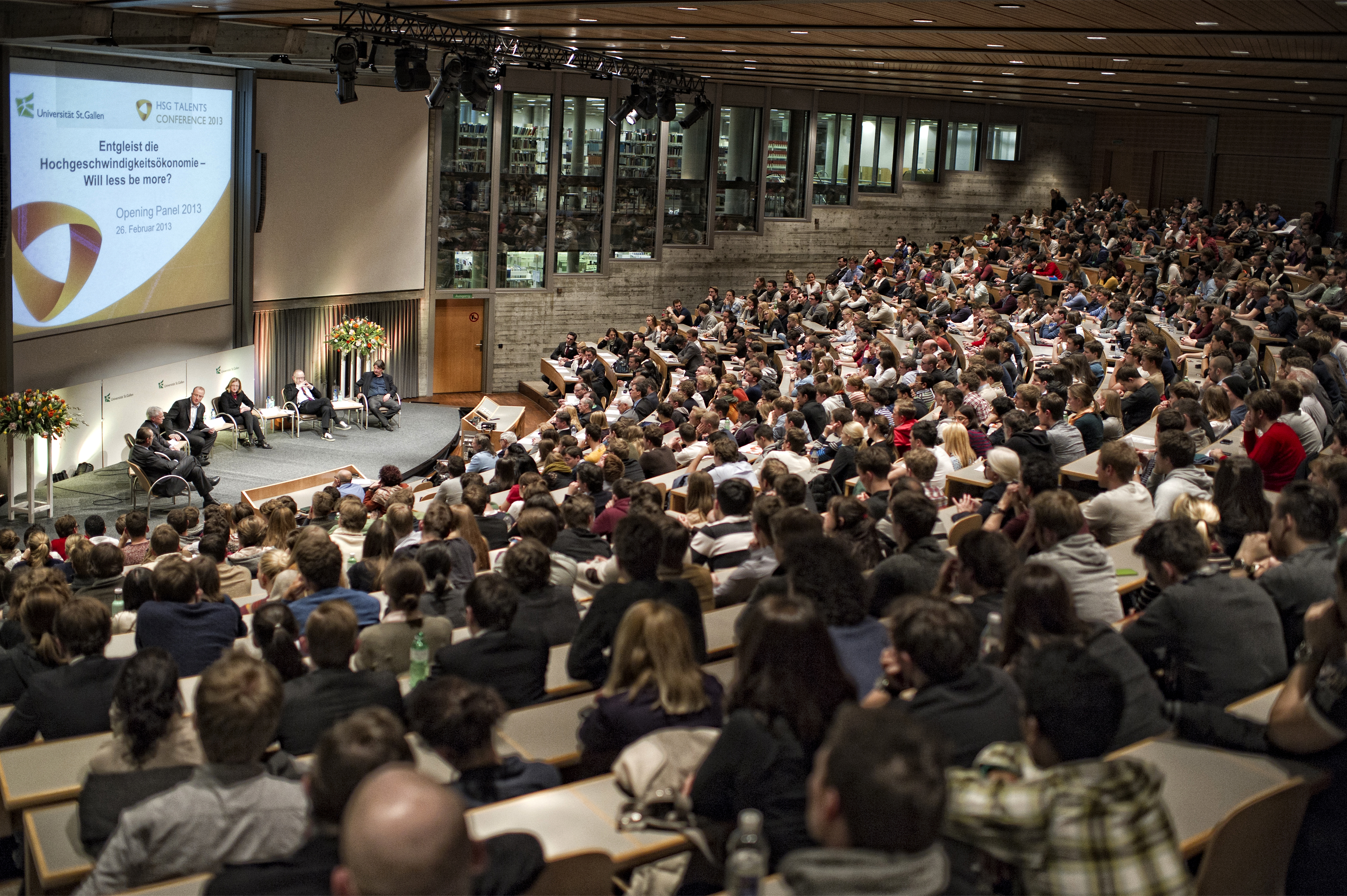
Opening panel of HSG Talents, a recruiting initiative run by students

The University of St. Gallen hosts 25% international students, an upper limit which has been fixed by the government.

There are about 130 clubs at the University of St. Gallen. Particularly well-known is the International Students' Committee, an organisation which plans and coordinates the annual St. Gallen Symposium. Since 1970, the St. Gallen Symposium has brought together leaders from business, science, politics and society with students from all over the world. AIESEC St. Gallen is a club that was founded in 1951 and provides an international internship programme. With over 3500 members, the Helvetian Investment Club (HIC) is the largest student association at the university and the biggest student-run finance society in the DACH region. Formed through the merger of four student organizations with roots dating back to 1986, the HIC has connected students with the financial services industry for decades. Founded in 2019 as a spin-off of the Helvetian Investment Club (HIC), HIC Capital is a student-run investment fund that enables selected members to gain practical experience through stock pitches and the development of trading strategies across multiple industries. One of the largest clubs with more than 600 members is DocNet, the doctoral students' club at the University of St. Gallen.

Founded in 2001, a major event of DocNet is the annual DocNet Management Symposium. A chapter of Oikos International, a student organisation for sustainable development, also plays an active role at the University of St. Gallen. Other clubs are mostly sports clubs, cultural clubs or associations of students of different countries or cantons, subject-specific clubs related to specialisations at the University of St. Gallen as well as fraternities.

The official organisation of former students of the University of St. Gallen is HSG Alumni. With more than 19,000 members and 80 alumni clubs on 4 continents, it is one of Europe's leading associations of its kind. Since 1930, the club has been reinforcing alumni's lifelong bonds with the university, as well as the networks among its members, utilising numerous events and information platforms.

== Notable people ==
Notable the University of St. Gallen alumni in the financial sector include:

- Paul Achleitner, Deutsche Bank Chairman
- Josef Ackermann, former Deutsche Bank CEO
- Martin Blessing,former Commerzbank CEO
- Julian Teicke, Founder & CEO of wefox
- Walter Kielholz, Swiss Re Honorary Chairman
- Alex Widmer, former Julius Baer Group CEO
- Peter Wuffli, former UBS CEO
- Valentin Stalf, co-founder of N26 and ex-CEO

Business leaders in other sectors who attended the University of St. Gallen include:

- Ola Källenius, Daimler AG CEO
- Nick Hayek, Jr., Swatch Group CEO
- Georges Kern, IWC CEO
- Philipp Navratil, Nestlé CEO
- Peer M. Schatz, Qiagen CEO
- Ulf Mark Schneider, former Fresenius SE CEO and Nestlé CEO
- Peter Fankhauser, Thomas Cook Group CEO
- Margret Suckale, BASF board member

Culture

- Rolf Dobelli, novelist and author

Politics

- Christoffel Brändli, Swiss politician and former President of the Swiss Council of States
- Prince Hans-Adam II, Sovereign Monarch and Head of State of Liechtenstein
- Hans-Rudolf Merz, Swiss politician
- Peter Spuhler, Swiss politician and Stadler Rail CEO
- Heinz Indermaur, Swiss politician
- Adrian Hasler, Prime Minister of Liechtenstein
- Klaus Tschütscher, former Prime Minister of Liechtenstein.
- Thomas Aeschi, businessman and politician
- Judith Sarah Jäger Bellaiche, politician

=== Faculty and staff ===
Notable current or former faculty members of the University of St. Gallen include the Advocate General of the Court of Justice of the European Union Juliane Kokott, corporate communication professor Miriam Meckel, art director Sir Peter Jonas, Walter Hunziker, developer of Tourism Science, and Ota Šik, Professor of Economics and one of the key figures in the Prague Spring.

== Controversies ==
Following a 2019 investigation by the cantonal audit office, the University of St. Gallen came under heavy criticism for the frivolous spending behaviour in some of its institutes. Representatives of the cantonal legislature called for a change in the university's culture of accountability.

In 2021, a professor at the University of St. Gallen ended her supervisor agreement with a temporarily deregistered doctorate student and had the university delete his email account, for making a negative comment on Twitter about China's communication during the beginning of the Covid-19 crisis.

== See also ==
- List of largest universities by enrollment in Switzerland
- List of modern universities in Europe (1801–1945)

== Bibliography ==
- Boller, Gabrielle (1998). Kunst und Architektur im Dialog: Universität St. Gallen (in German). Benteli. ISBN 3-71651-076-9.
- Burmeister, Karl Heinz (1998). 100 Jahre HSG: Geschichte der Universität St. Gallen, Hochschule für Wirtschafts-, Rechts- und Sozialwissenschaften (in German). Bern: Stämpfli. ISBN 3-72729-248-2.
