= Glion (disambiguation) =

Glion may refer to:

- Glion, a village in the municipality of Montreux in the canton of Vaud, Switzerland
- Glion Institute of Higher Education, a university in Switzerland
- Glion, Japanese for Gliscor, fictional species #472 of Pokémon in the Pokémon media franchise
