= The Ring Thing =

2004 Swiss feature film

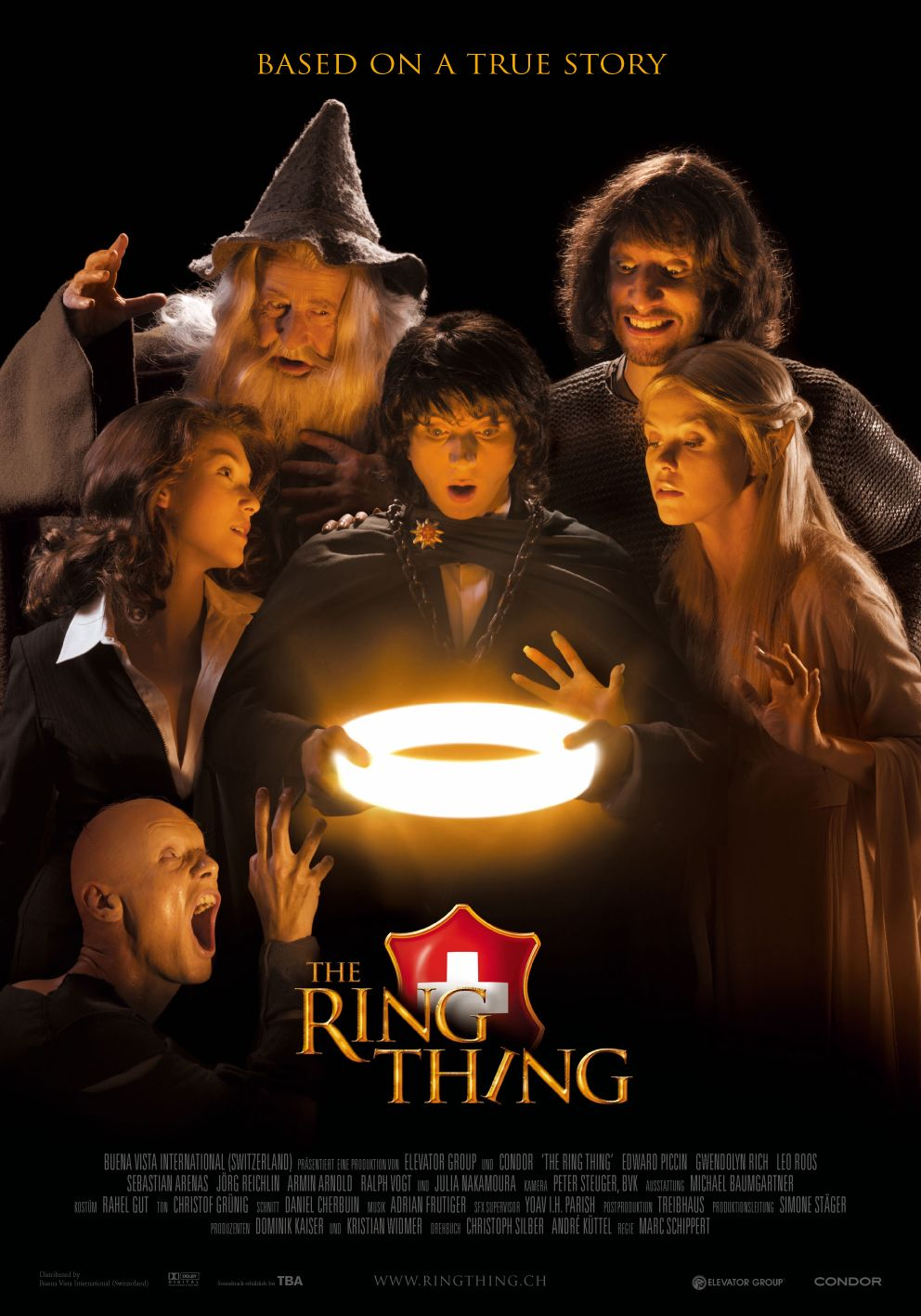
- Directed by: Marc Schippert
- Screenplay by: Christoph Silber; Thorsten Wettcke
- Produced by: Dominik Kaiser
- Starring: Kamil Krejčí; Edward Piccin
- Cinematography: Peter Steuger
- Music by: Diego Baldenweg with Nora Baldenweg and Lionel Baldenweg
- Distributed by: Buena Vista International
- Release date: 10 December 2004
- Running time: 80 minutes
- Country: Switzerland
- Language: German

The Ring Thing is a 2004 Swiss parody film. Produced without state film funding, it is a low-budget comic spoof on the Lord of the Rings film trilogy. It had its world premiere on 14 December 2004 at the Pathé cinema centre near Zurich. The theatrical release in Switzerland was in mid-December 2004, and summer of 2005 in Germany.

== Plot summary ==
The Swiss banker Fredi has fallen in love with the irascible Heidi. For his marriage proposal, Fredi has bought an engagement ring. While he is practising his proposal on an aeroplane toilet, the floor of the plane suddenly breaks through and Fredi falls to earth together with the toilet and the ring and wakes up in a strange mountain world. There he is mistaken for the hobbit Friedo and learns from old Almgandhi that the evil Lord Sauraus has stolen his ring, which apparently has great magical powers he wants to use to fondue the world. Fredi and Almgandhi then set out together with the telehobbie Pupsi, the nymphomaniac elf Grümpfli, the former ring owner Schleimli and the warrior Rackaroll to defeat Sauraus. It is eventually revealed that Pupsi is actually a villain who betrayed the heroes to Sauraus, after the latter tricked Pupsi telling him he was his father. In the end Fredi gets the ring and everything has a happy ending: Grümpfli and Schleimli get married, Fredi leaves Heidi to his arch-rival Sauraus and lives on happily as Friedo in this strange Swiss mountain world that he has stumbled upon.

== Production ==
The exterior shots for the film were shot by the executive producer Condor Films for almost four weeks, mainly in the anterior Rhine valley. Other locations were the Caumasee near Flims and the Seleger Moor near Rifferswil/ZH. For the castle scenes, filming took place in the Munot castle in Schaffhausen. Originally, the producers planned to have the actor of Winnetou Pierre Brice appear in the film in a guest role as an Indian chief. After reading the script, Brice cancelled his participation. He feared having to expose the film character Winnetou, which he had made into a legend, to the ridicule of the young viewers. The role of the Indian chief was then deleted from the script without replacement. Instead, a scene with the Emperor of China was added to the film.

The film's title song "Lueg mi Aaa" (Swiss dialect for "Look at me") was composed by the siblings Diego Baldenweg with Nora Baldenweg and Lionel Baldenweg. The music video for the song was recorded by the band "The Alfornos feat Heidi P" at the Bellerive Studios with the original actors.

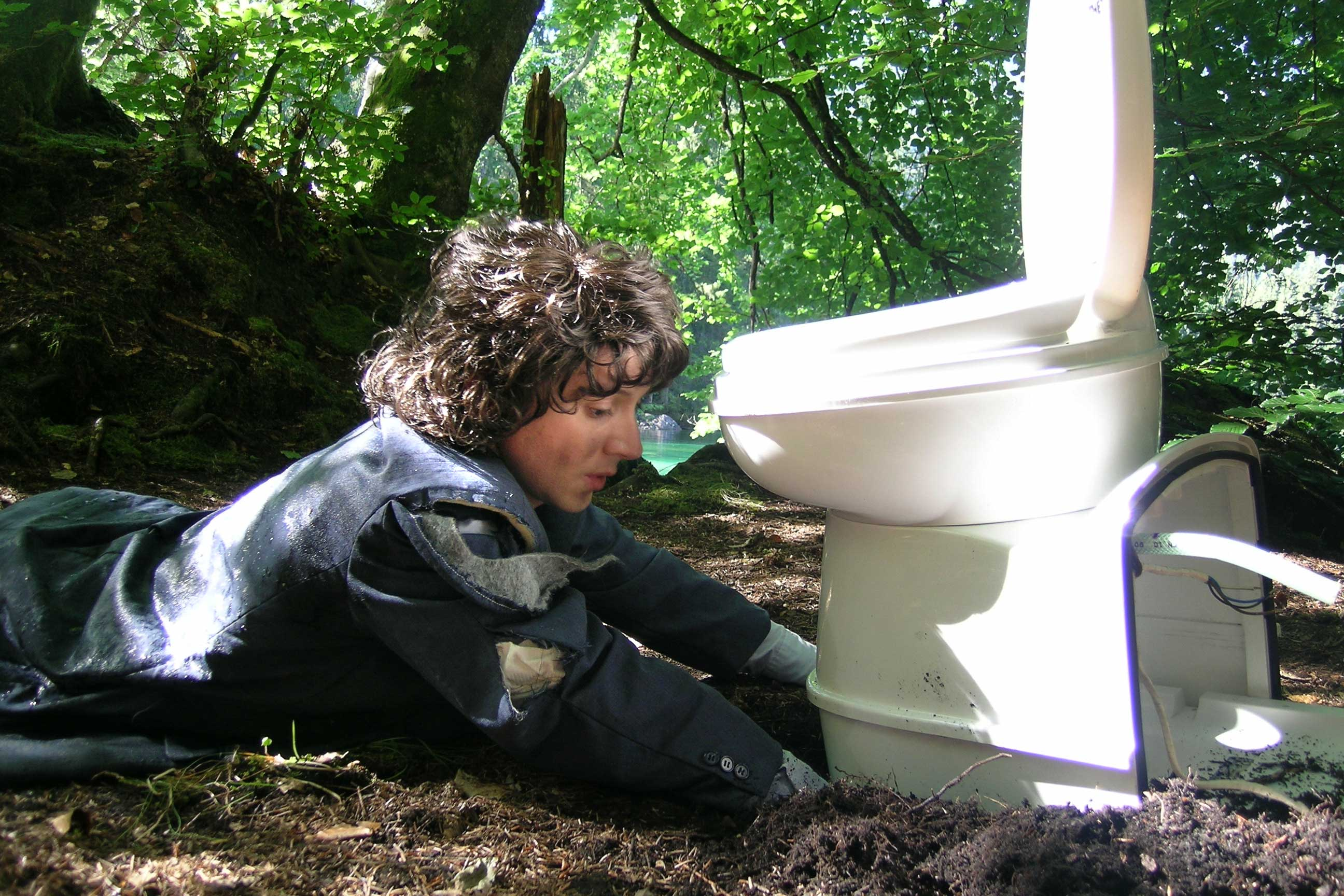
Fredi / Friedo and the airplane toilet

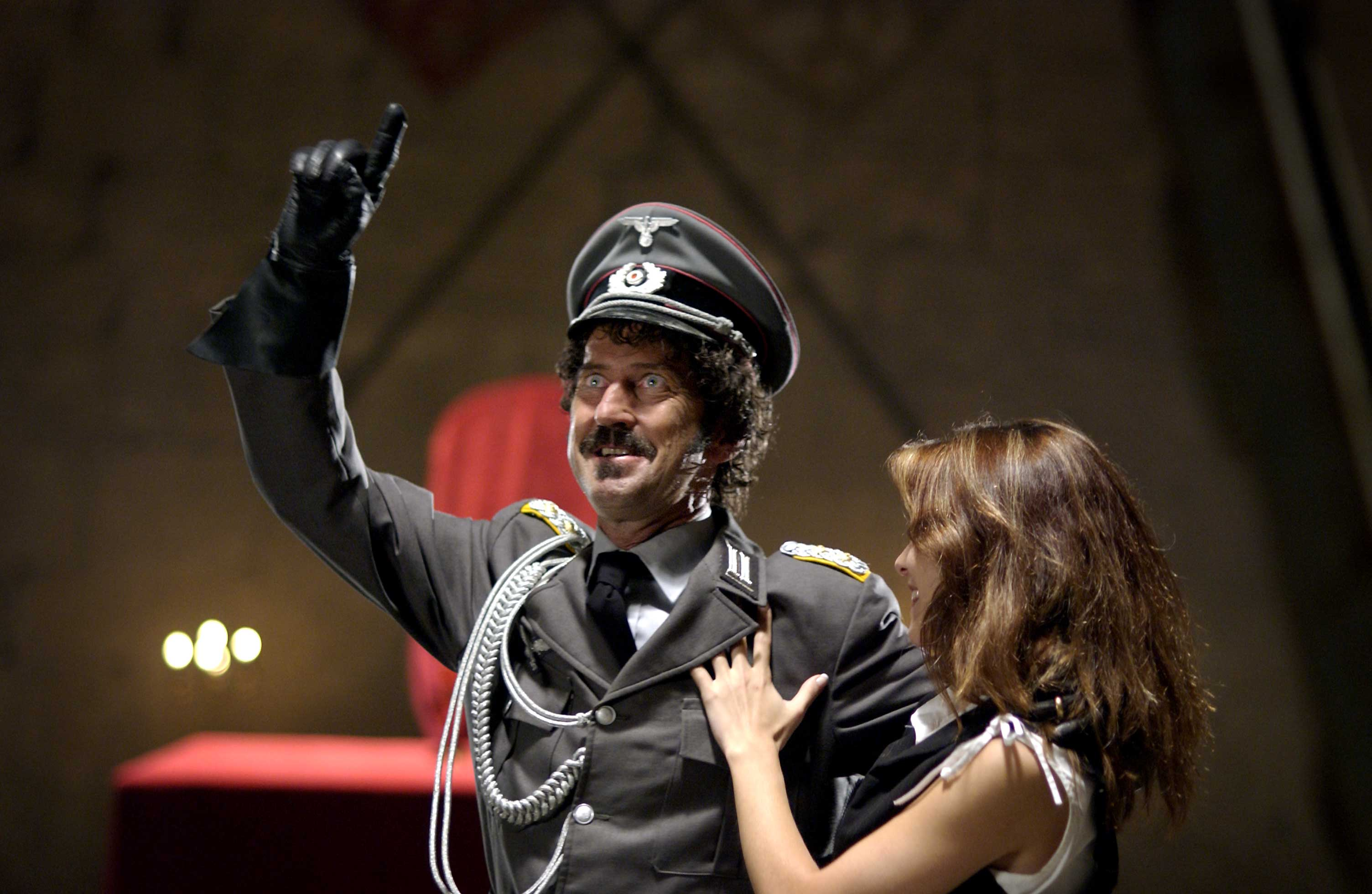
Lord Sauraus and Heidi

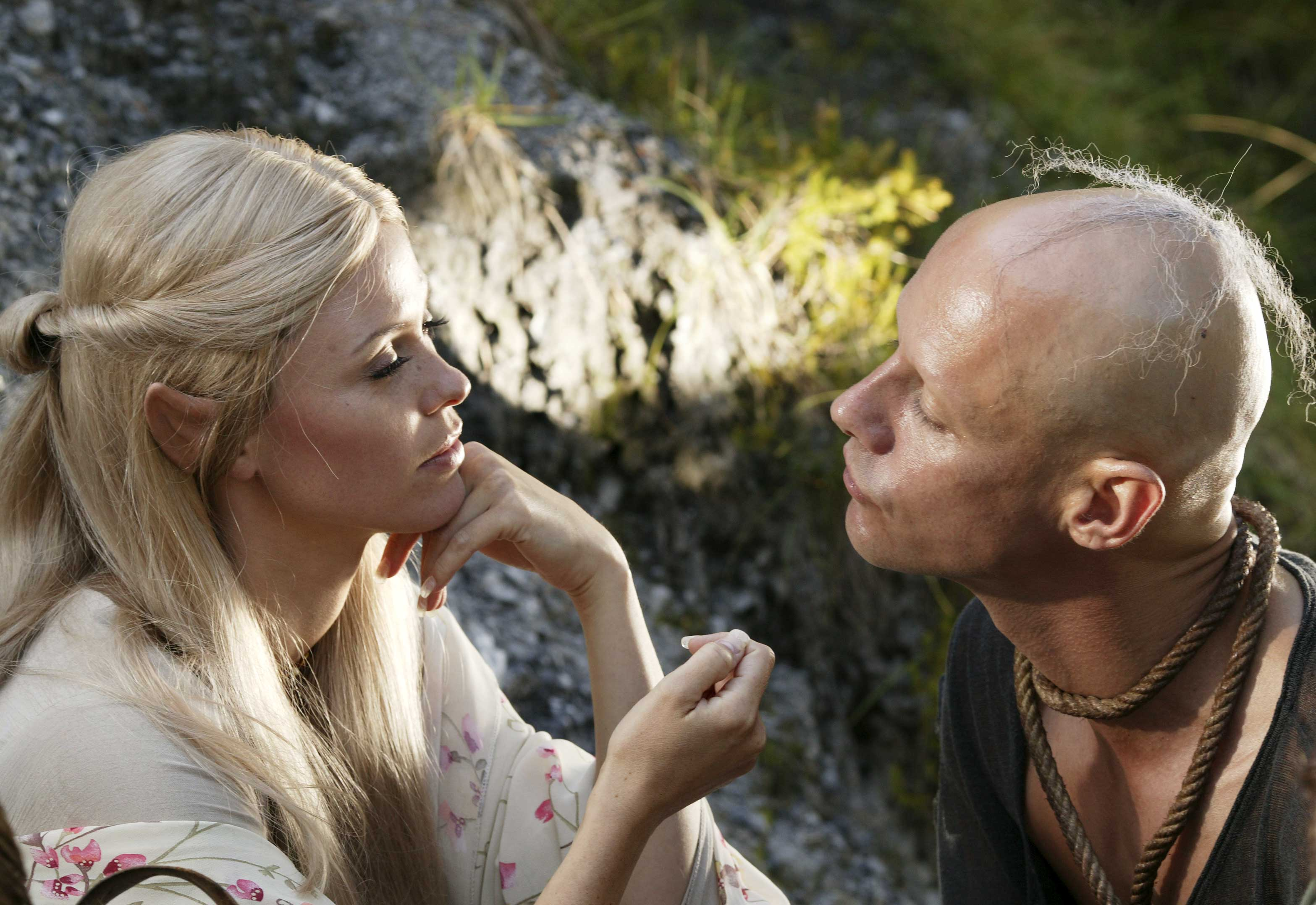
Grümpfli and Schleimli

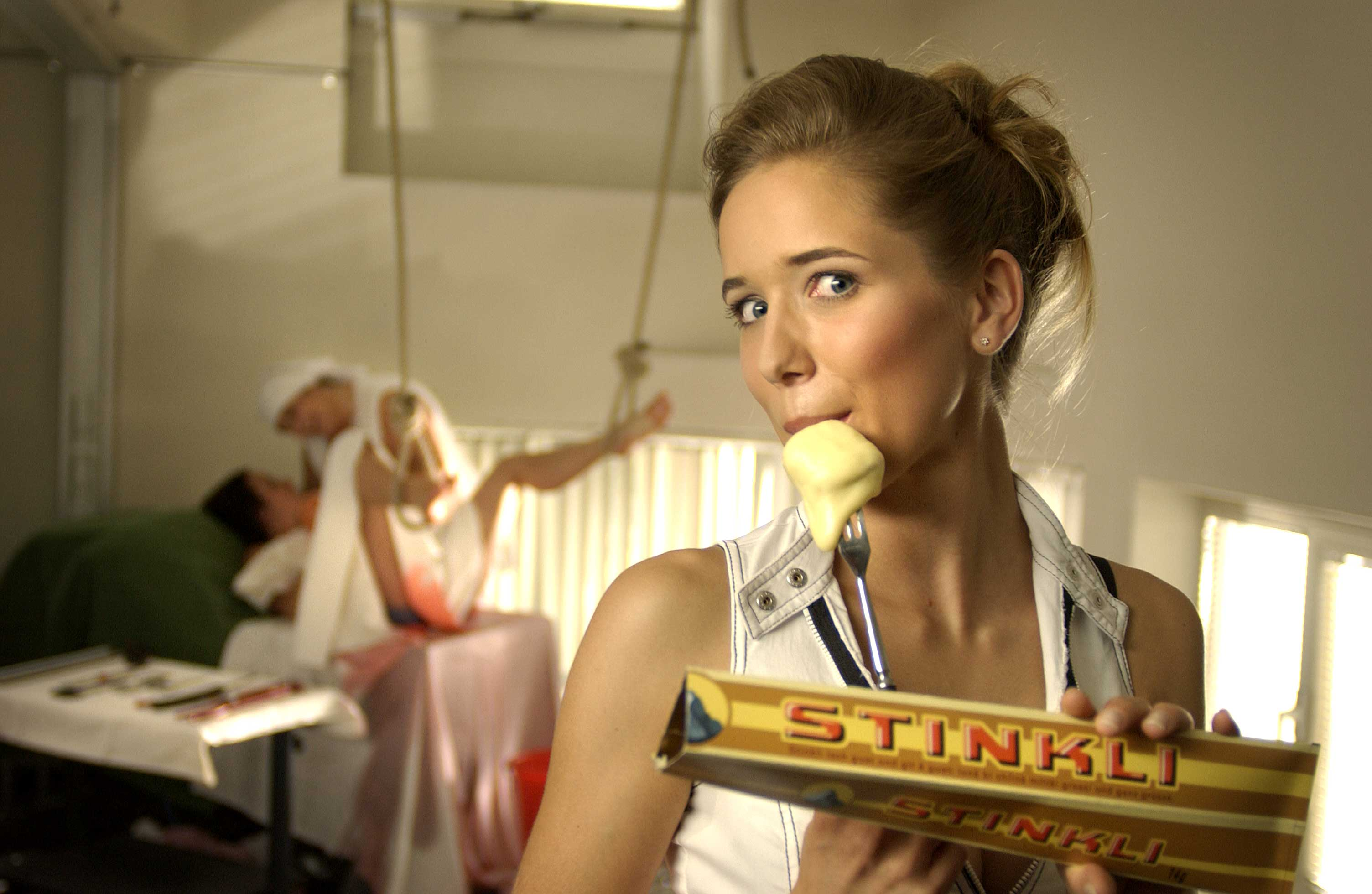
parody of the Toblerone packaging

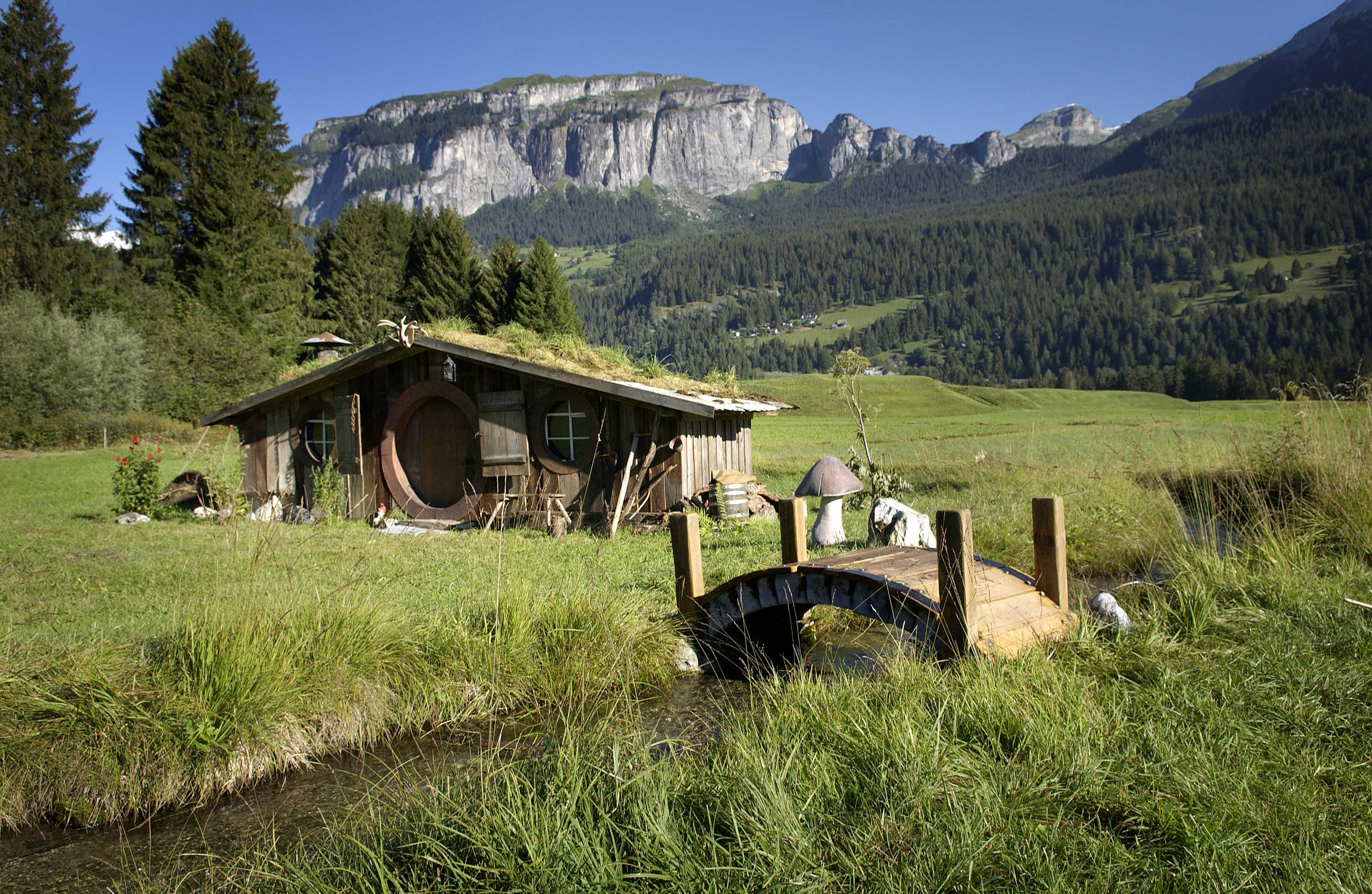
outdoor set

== Reviews ==
The film was panned upon release by film critics in Switzerland. The character Pupsi was especially criticised. The Swiss news magazine FACTS, after insisting on an exclusive advance screening, wrote: "Probably the worst Swiss film ever!"

Shortly after the film's release in Switzerland, the national film funder Federal Office of Culture (which had not supported the film) received a legal complaint of racism. This was in relation to the word "Mongo" (often considered to be racist and ableist) used twice in dialogue: once when Grümpfli insults Prince Rackaroll (an Aragorn-like character stated to have 4 IQ points when he is introduced), and subsequently used by Rackaroll himself in a battle with an Uru-Cow. The lawsuit was dropped as frivolous.

The authors' deliberate use of long-forgotten old-fashioned words from the Swiss dialect, such as the expression "Gorilla Blauarsch", met with a great response from the young audience. After the start of DVD sales, the film quickly gained cult status among Swiss schoolchildren. Many parents complained to the outlets that their children would constantly talk like the characters in the film.

In contrast to the theatrical release, the DVD release in Germany was accompanied by a majority of very positive trade reviews: "Fans of the Peter Jackson trilogy (...) will certainly get their money's worth", "Produced on a minimal budget, the film is lovingly crafted down to the last detail." "A hilariously funny Swiss take on Middle Earth, where absurd dialogue, idiotic characters and inane plot twists abound."

== Ticket sales ==
The film, distributed by Disney's subsidiary Buena Vista International, grossed over 65,000 admissions in Switzerland within a few weeks, making it the second most successful theatrical film of the year. Likewise, the film was in the top 20 of the Swiss DVD charts for weeks.

== Distribution ==
The Ring Thing was acquired by Senator Film (now Wild Bunch AG) for a release in Germany and Austria even before the theatrical release in Switzerland and was professionally dubbed into the German dialects of those markets. Subsequently, bootleg recordings of the film appeared on DVD in various countries of the former Eastern Bloc.
