= Kristian Widmer =

Swiss film and television producer

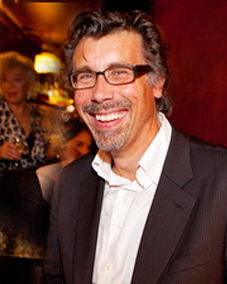
Widmer in 2010

Kristian Widmer (born October 26, 1967) is a Swiss entrepreneur, film producer, and television producer.

== Early life and career ==
Widmer was born on October 26, 1967. He holds a law degree from the University of Zurich and an MBA from the University of St. Gallen HSG. He started working in the film business as an editor. Originally with Vega Film, in 1994, he joined Condor Films, a film production company founded in 1947. For Condor Entertainment and Condor Commercials, divisions of the Academy Award-winning company, Widmer worked as a location and production manager on numerous films in Europe, US, Australia, and South America. In 2001, he produced Building the Gherkin, an award-winning documentary. In 2003, he produced the feature film Three Against Troy for German television broadcaster ZDF. In 2004, he co-produced the movie The Ring Thing.

=== Involvement with Condor Films ===
In 1999, Widmer joined the managing board of Condor Films. In 2003, he became the Chief Executive Officer of the production company, and in 2008, he was appointed President. From 2002 to 2006, he was a member of the board of Filmlocation Switzerland, and since 2006, has been a member of the board of the Swiss Film Association. In 2010, a group of independent journalists selected Kristian Widmer as one of the 200 most important people in Zurich.
