= Ralph van Deusen =

Dutch screenwriter

Ralph van Deusen (born May 13, 1976) is a Dutch screenwriter.

== Biography ==
Ralph van Deusen attended Utrecht University and Hogeschool Sint-Lukas Brussel where he studied audiovisual Arts. In 1996 he moved to Los Angeles. Due to an illness in his childhood, Ralph van Deusen suffers of Aphasia. He makes his living working as a screenwriter and ghostwriter.

== Filmography ==
- My Mother's Messias (1996)
- Target: Teacher (1997)
- The Secret (1999, Director: Dani Levy)
- Highway from Hell (2002, Director: Xavier Koller, Production Company: Condor Films)
- Pilots (2006, Director: Thomas Gerber)
