= Bellerive Studios =

Film studios located in Zürich

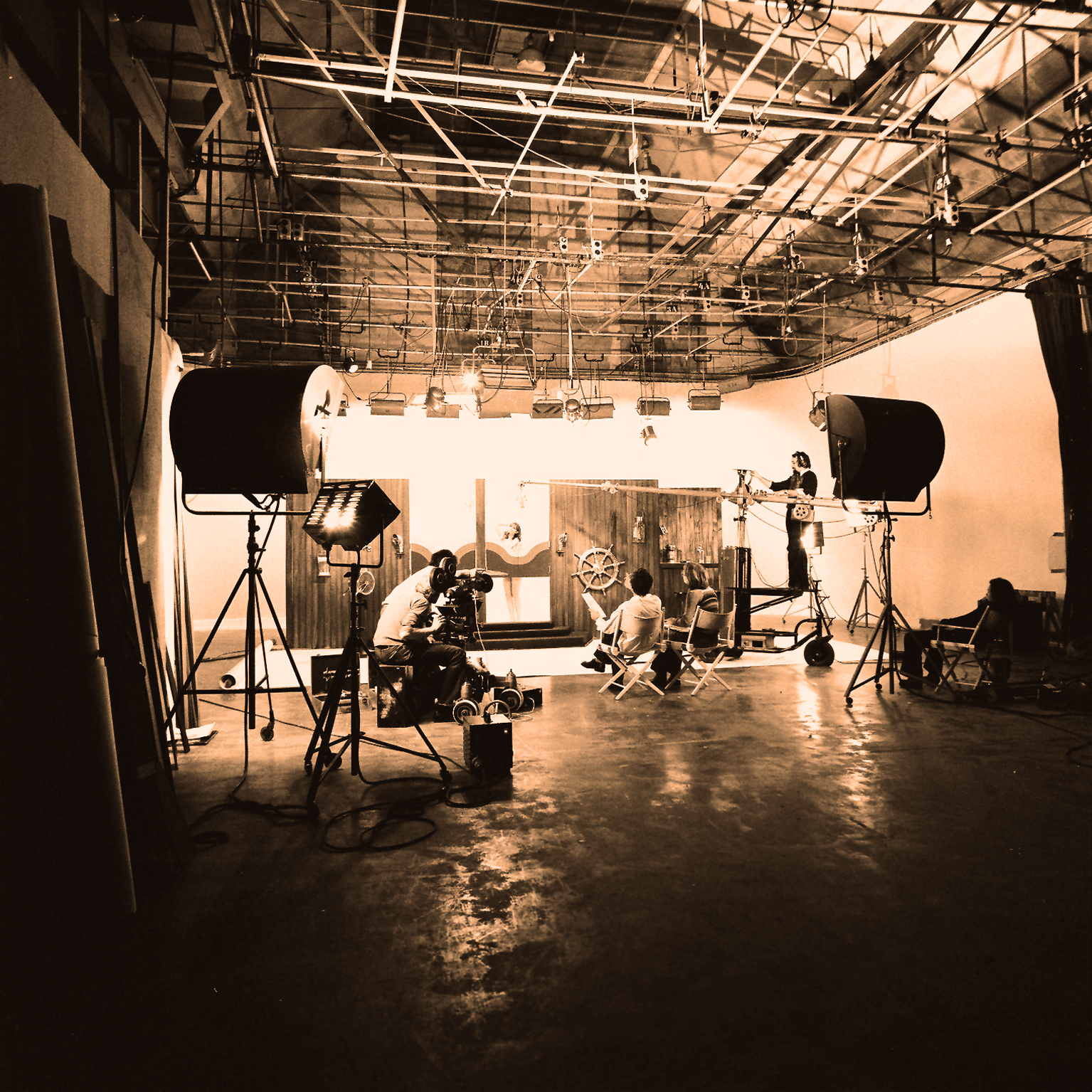
The studios in 1975.

The Bellerive Studios (German: Studio Bellerive) are film studios in Zürich in Switzerland, located in the Seefeld district of the city. They were established in the 1941 on a site that had previously been used as a garage and sports complex with indoor tennis courts. From 1952 the site was used for Swiss television production. In 1972 it was acquired by Condor Films and expanded.

== Bibliography ==
- Bauche, Freddy. Le cinéma suisse: 1898-1998. L'AGE D'HOMME, 1998.
- Haver, Gianni. Les lueurs de la guerre: écrans vaudois 1939-1945. Payot Lausanne, 2003.
- Amsler, André. Rückblende: vom Schwarzweissfilm zum Digitalvideo; fünfzig Jahre Produktionstechnik. Chronos, 2004.
