= Docnet =

- Consortium of Business Doctoral Programs
- Founder: Association to Advance Collegiate Schools of Business (AACSB)
- Type: Virtual community
- Purpose: Promote doctoral education in business globally
- Region served: Worldwide
- Vice-Chair: Bryan Southworth
- Parent organization: Association to Advance Collegiate Schools of Business
- Website: businessdocnet.com

DocNet is a consortium of university business schools granting doctoral degrees in business administration and economics. It is a virtual community under the umbrella of the Association to Advance Collegiate Schools of Business (AACSB) that focuses on promoting doctoral education in business. It supports recruiting efforts, the sharing of best practices, and student support and placement.

DocNet also advocates for doctoral programs within its members' respective colleges and universities and at the national level through AACSB International, the Graduate Management Admission Council, and the media.

== History ==
In 2023, Docnet said that data from its members showed that between 2018 and 2022 there was a steady decline of students in the United States earning business doctorates.

== Member institutions ==
As of 2025, Docnet had more than 144 member institutions worldwide.
