= Walter Hunziker =

- Born: 27 March 1899; Zurich, Switzerland
- Died: 7 January 1974 (aged 74); Switzerland
- Education: University of Zurich
- Known for: Developing the field of tourism science
- Scientific career
- Fields: Tourism
- Workplaces: University of St. Gallen

Walter Hunziker (1899–1974) was a Swiss professor who founded the Tourism Research Institute at the University of St. Gallen, co-developed the scientific study of tourism, developed the travel savings fund concept, co-founded the Association Internationale d'Experts Scientifiques du Tourisme (AIEST) and the Institut International de Glion. He was a director of the Swiss Tourism Federation, member of Swiss Advisory Committee for Trade Policy, and author.

== Early life ==
Hunziker was born in Zurich on 27 Mar 1899 to Jakob Hunziker, but Walter Hunziker's place of citizenship was Moosleerau, Aargau. In 1917, he completed a two-year primary commercial school (Handelsschule) in Zurich before receiving a Doctorate in Economic Sciences from the University of Zurich in 1923. His doctoral thesis was on the Swiss cotton industry, 1914-1919. Hunziker was first employed by Swiss Natural Gas (Schweizerischen Gaswerke) and the Eidgenössische Bank, before becoming the business editor and subsequently business and publishing director of the Berner Tagblatt.

== Science of tourism ==
In March 1936, Hunziker was hired to be secretary of the Swiss Tourist Association and, on 23 Oct 1937, appointed its director. In 1941, Hunziker initiated graduate studies in tourism at the University of St. Gallen. Hunziker founded a Tourism Research Institute at the University of St. Gallen in conjunction with that founded by Kurt Krapf at the University of Berne. The Institute is now known as the Institut für Öffentliche Dienstleistungen und Tourismus (Institute for Public Service and Tourism). In 1942, Hunziker collaborated with Krapf (director of the Bern Research Institute of Tourism) to publish the "Outline of the General Teaching of Tourism" (Grundriss der Allgemeinen Fremdenverkehrslehre), which became the standard work for basic research in tourism. As part of this text, Hunziker and Krapf developed one of the first broadly accepted definitions of "tourism" (Fremdenverkehr), roughly translated as "Tourism is the sum of the phenomena and relationships arising from the travel and stay of non-residents, in so far as they do not lead to permanent residence and are not connected with any earning activity." A year later Hunziker published a book on the system of "scientific tourism research" (System und Hauptprobleme einer wissenschaftlichen Fremdenverkehrslehre) in which he tried to establish a "completely new discipline" as a branch of sociology; however, the attempt failed. But Hunziker and Krapf continued to examine tourism not only from an economic perspective, but also from a sociological one. Hunziker did not want tourism to have a negative impact on the cultural values of either the destination or the tourist. In 1972, Dr. Hunziker defined the essential elements of tourism science as:

- understanding the nature of tourism;
- defining and explaining the various terms and concepts associated with tourism;
- developing tourism pedagogy that is practical and not just theoretical; and,
- addressing problems related to economic policy and business management.

Hunziker was an early advocate of the need to apply interdisciplinary scientific analysis to understand the highly diverse nature of tourism, develop a coherent tourism pedagogy, and use that analytical framework and training to resolve problems associated with business management and economic policy. Although Hunziker was an economist by training, he rejected the earlier view of tourism research as a subset solely of economics. Instead, Hunziker viewed tourism more as a cultural phenomenon. As such, he expanded tourism research to integrate aspects of sociology, psychology, history, geography, marketing and law as well as an understanding of how medicine and technology impacts tourism.

=== Social tourism ===
In May 1959, at the second Congress of Social Tourism (Austria), Dr. Hunziker proposed the following definition: “Social tourism is a type of tourism practiced by low income groups, and which is rendered possible and facilitated by entirely separate and therefore easily recognizable services”. He viewed tourism as adding value to society by increasing understanding of other cultures and thereby reducing xenophobia and isolationism. For these reasons (rather than looking solely at economics), Dr. Hunziker opined that governments should support and encourage social tourism.

=== Reka ===
As a pragmatic implementation of social tourism, Walter Hunziker co-developed the concept of the Swiss travel savings fund (Schweizerische Reisekasse or Reka), which helps low income families enjoy vacations. Hunziker was president of REKA, 1939-1974.

== Tourism institutes and associations ==
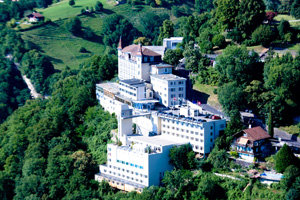
Glion Institute of Higher Education

In 1951, Drs. Hunziker and Krapf founded the Association Internationale d'Experts Scientifiques du Tourisme (AIEST) in order to re-connect tourism researchers after World War II. In 1962, Hunziker and Frédéric Tissot co-founded the Institut International de Glion. Professor Hunziker was the founding president of the International Organisation of Social Tourism and ran the organization from 1963 until his death in 1974. Consistent with Dr. Hunziker's focus on social tourism, the aim of the OITS is to facilitate "the development of social tourism in the international framework. To this end it is in charge of coordinating the tourist activities of its members, as well as informing them on all matters concerning social tourism, as much on the cultural aspects as on the economic and social consequences." Further, OITS continues to promote Dr. Hunziker's interest in "access to leisure, holidays and tourism for the greatest number of people - youth, families, seniors and disabled people" and "fair and sustainable tourism, ensuring profit for the host populations and respecting the natural and cultural heritage."

== Other professional positions ==
Dr. Walter Hunziker was also Director of the Swiss Federation of Tourism (1937-1945), professor of tourism at the University of St. Gallen (1941-1969), Executive Vice President of the Swiss Federation of Tourism (1946-1964), and a member of the Swiss Advisory Committee for Trade Policy (1946-1964).

== Works ==
- Hunziker, Walter; Krapf, Kurt (1941). Beiträge zur Fremdenverkehrslehre und Fremdenverkehrsgeschichte [Contributions to tourism education and tourism history]. Publikationen des schweizerischen Fremdenverkehrsverbandes. Vol. 15. Bern: Fédération Suisse du Tourisme. OCLC 69064371.
- Hunziker, Walter; Krapf, Kurt (1942). Grundriss der Allgemeinen Fremdenverkehrslehre [Outline of the general teaching of tourism]. Seminars für Fremdenverkehr und Verkehrspolitik an der Handels-Hochschule St. Gallen. Vol. 1. Zurich: Polygraphischer Verlag AG. OCLC 180109383.
- Hunziker, Walter (1943). System und Hauptprobleme einer wissenschaftlichen Fremdenverkehrslehre [System and main problems of scientific tourism research]. Handels-Hochschule (St. Gallen). Seminar fur Fremdenverkehr. Schriftenreihe (in German). Vol. 5. St. Gallen. OCLC 258154635.
- Hunziker, Walter; Kens, Andrew Gabriel (1951). Le Tourisme Social: caracteres et problemes [Social tourism: its nature and problems]. Publication de la Commission Scientifique de l'Alliance Internationale de Tourisme (in French). Vol. 1. Geneva: Imprim. Federative SA. OCLC 255533141. OL 21122881M.
- Hunziker, Walter; Krapf, Kurt (1955). Schweizerische Gesellschaft für Statistik und Volkswirtschaft (ed.). "Fremdenverkehr" [Tourism]. Handbuch der Schweizerischen Volkswirtschaft. 1. Bern: Benteli-Verlag: 496–503. OCLC 605314141.
- Hunziker, Walter (1959). Betriebswirtschaftslehre des Fremdenverkehrs: Der Fremdenverkehrsbetrieb und seine Organisation [Business Administration of Tourism: The tourist industry and its organization]. Schriftenreihe des Seminars für Fremdenverkehr und Verkehrspolitik an der Hochschule St. Gallen (in German). Vol. 18. Bern: Gurtenverlag. OCLC 29890664.
- Hunziker, Walter (1972). Le tourisme: caracteristiques principales (in French). Berne: Gurten. OL 13892254M.

Many articles in the Zeitschrift für Fremdenverkehr (Journal of Tourism) and Jahrbuch für Fremdenverkehr (Yearbook of Tourism).

== See also ==
Geschichte der Tourismusforschung (History of Tourism Research)
