= Peer M. Schatz =

Swiss businessman (born 1965)

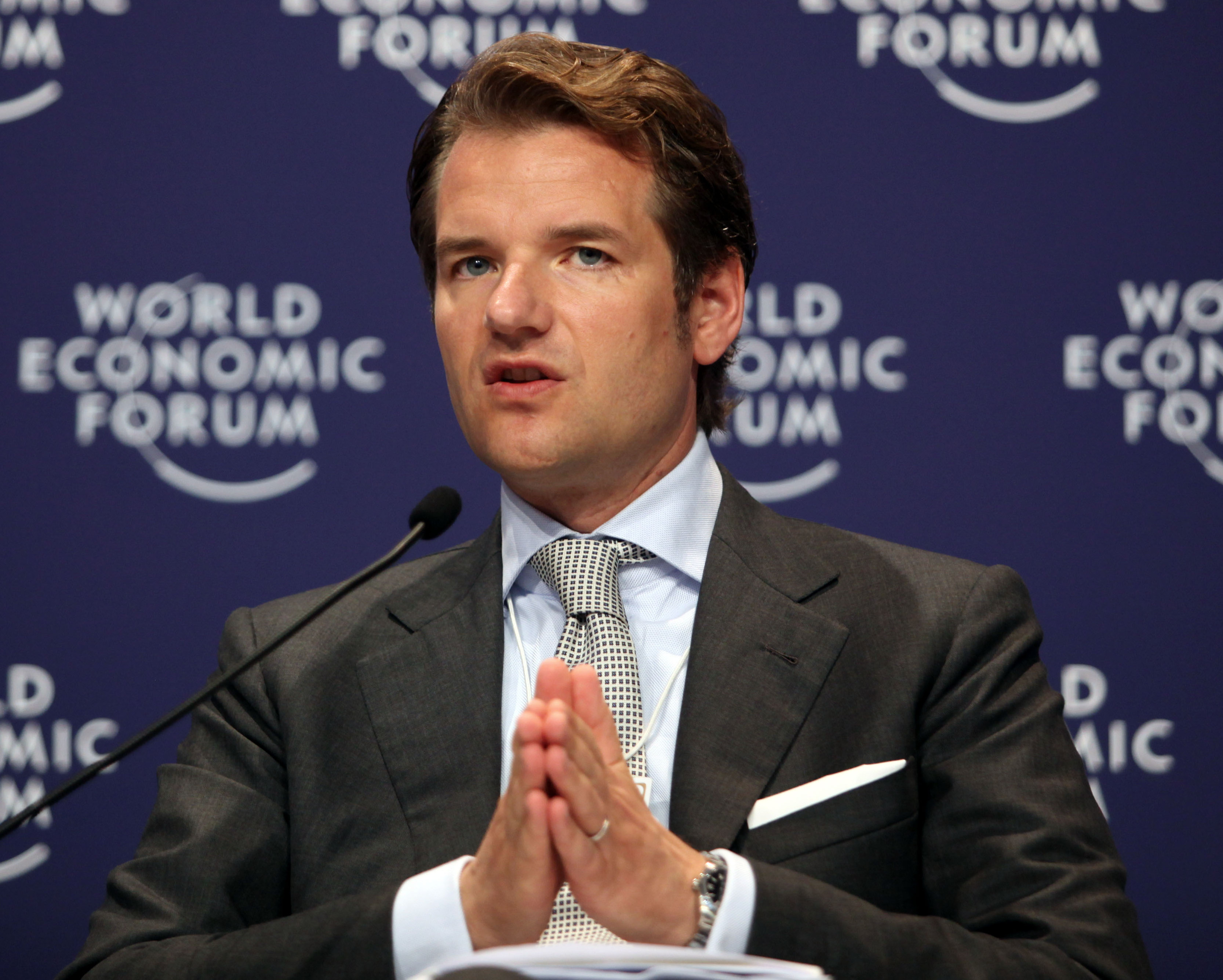
Peer M. Schatz at the World Economic Forum Annual Meeting of the New Champions in 2009

Peer M. Schatz (born August 3, 1965) is a Swiss and Austrian entrepreneur and executive in the life sciences. He was the chief executive officer of QIAGEN N.V. from 2004 to 2019.

== Early life and education ==
Schatz grew up in the United States and Switzerland. After his Matura (A-Levels/ university entrance diploma), Schatz studied business and social sciences at the University of St. Gallen, Switzerland. He graduated with a master's degree in finance in 1989 and obtained a Master of Business Administration (MBA) from the University of Chicago Graduate School in Business in 1990.

== Career ==
Schatz worked in different positions for Sandoz AG and Computerland and participated in the foundation of startup companies in the computer and software trading industry in Europe and the United States.

In 1993, Schatz joined QIAGEN and held the role of chief financial officer during the company's initial public offering at the Nasdaq in 1996 as the first German company ever and the subsequent listing at the Frankfurt Stock Exchange (Germany). During his time at QIAGEN, the company grew from $2 million in annual revenues to $1.5 billion in 2018.

Schatz resigned as CEO October 7, 2019 and transitioned to the role of special advisor. SEC filings list Schatz as the owner of a number of shares and rights on shares which represented about 3% of the outstanding shares of QIAGEN in 2019.

Schatz serves as a member of the Managing Board of PS Capital Management GmbH.

== Other activities ==
He is chairman of the board of Resolve Biosciences NV and a member of the supervisory board of Siemens Healthineers AG. and a member of the advisory board of Deutsche Bank AG. Previous positions included vice chairman and director positions of AdvaMedDx (U.S. in-vitro diagnostics industry organization) and ALDA (U.S. Life Science and Diagnostics Association), board roles at several companies in the life sciences and biotechnology industries as well as advisory board roles including at HSBC Trinkaus & Burkhardt

From 2001 to 2011, Schatz served as a member of the German Corporate Governance Commission.

== Personal life ==
Schatz is married to Nadine Schatz-Grandjean-Perrenoud-Contesse, a Swiss citizen and likewise an alumna of the University of St. Gallen. He is the son of biochemist Gottfried Schatz, who co-discovered mitochondrial DNA.
