= Glion Institute of Higher Education =

Private hospitality management school

Coordinates: 46.4324°N 6.9216°E

- Institut de hautes études de Glion
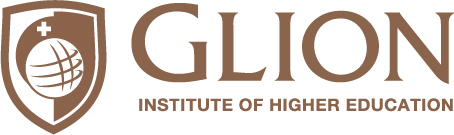
- Motto: Experience Excellence
- Established: September 1962
- Accreditation: NECHE; QAA; AACSB member SAC
- Affiliations: Sommet Education
- President: Philippe Vignon
- Faculty: 97 (Lecturers & Practical Arts Instructors)
- Administrative staff: 300
- Students: 2557 (2022)
- Undergraduates: 1663
- Postgraduates: 894
- Location: Switzerland and United Kingdom
- Campus: Glion & Bulle, and London
- Website: glion.edu

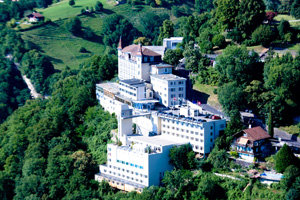
Glion Institute of Higher Education campus

The Glion Institute of Higher Education (GIHE, French: Institut de hautes études de Glion) provides instruction in hospitality management, with campuses in Switzerland and the United Kingdom.

== History ==
Established in 1962 as the Institut International de Glion, the school was founded by Swiss professors Walter Hunziker and Frédéric Tissot on the site of the former Grand Hôtel Bellevue, in Montreux, Switzerland. The initial class consisted of fifteen students from five countries, studying courses delivered in French.

In 1977, Glion changed its name to the Centre International de Glion (CIG), before becoming Glion Hotel School. In 1989 a second campus was opened in Bulle. In 2002, Glion updated its name to Glion Institute of Higher Education and became part of Laureate Education, an American education company.

In 2013, Glion opened a new campus in London, located in the grounds of the University of Roehampton. By 2016, Glion was acquired by Eurazeo, a multinational private equity firm based in Paris, France. Glion operates under the umbrella of hospitality education group Sommet Education.

== Rankings ==
In terms of employer reputation, Glion is ranked among the world's Top 3 institutions for Hospitality and Leisure Management, according to the 2026 QS World University Rankings by Subject.

== See also ==
- List of Hospitality Management Schools in Switzerland
