= Margret Suckale =

German manager and lawyer

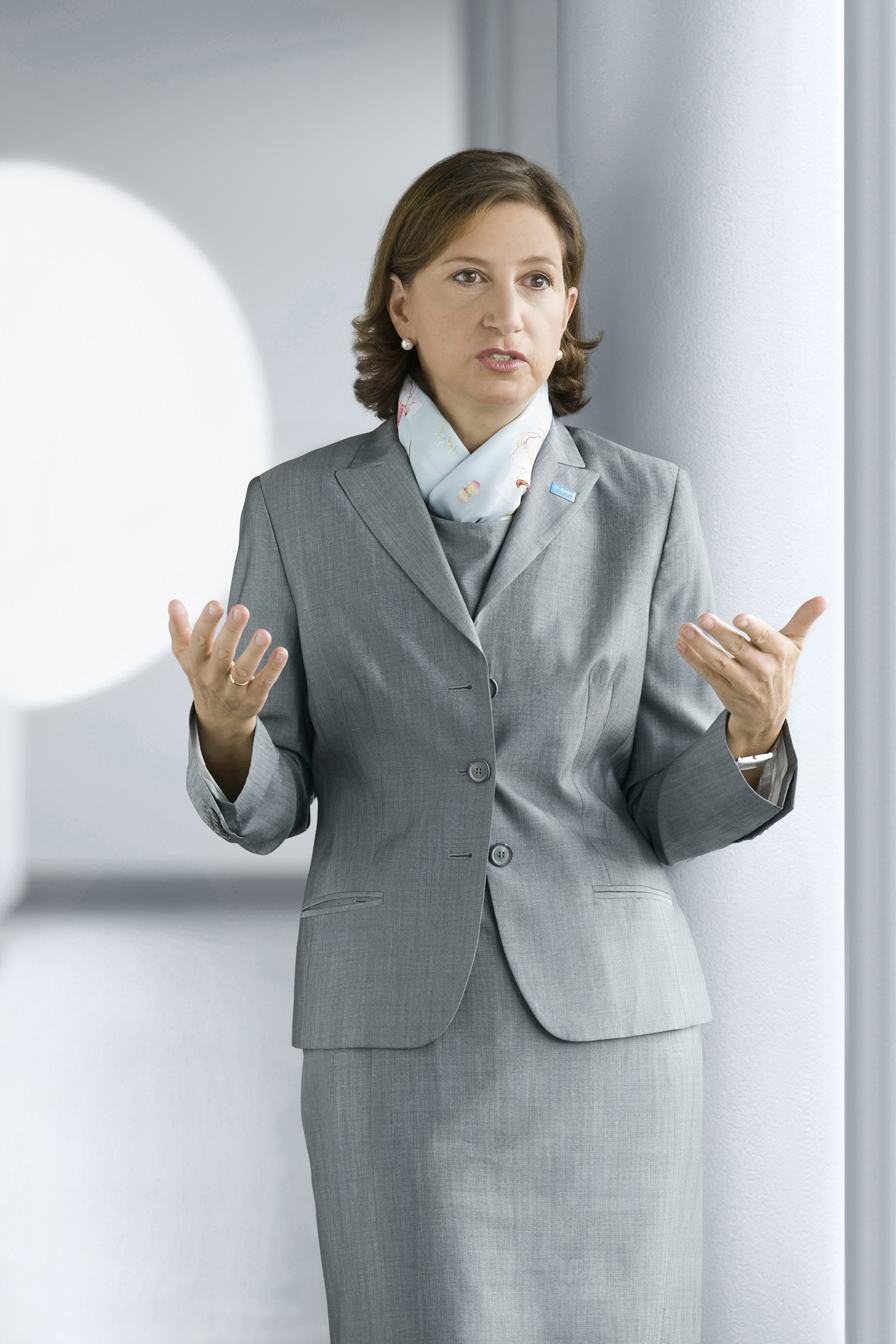
Margret Suckale

Margret Suckale (born May 31, 1956, in Hamburg) is a German manager and lawyer best known for her work as a member of the board of Deutsche Bahn AG.

== Career ==
Suckale began working at Deutsche Bahn in 1997. From 1997 to 2005, she was manager of the legal department. Upon joining the company's board, Suckale was responsible for the Human Resources department. In 2009 she was involved in scandal of Deutsche Bahn, collecting employee data illegally.

Before working at DB, Suckale was an executive at Mobil Oil, also working in the HR sector.

Suckale became global head of human resources at BASF in July, 2009. From 2011 until 2017 she served on the executive board of BASF in 2011; as industrial relations director and site director of Ludwigshafen she was globally responsible for human resources, engineering & maintenance, environment, health & safety and Verbund Site Management Europe.

== Other activities ==
=== Corporate boards ===
- Freshfields Bruckhaus Deringer Germany, Chair of the Ethics Committee (since 2024)
- Infineon, member of the supervisory board (since 2020)
- DWS Group, member of the supervisory board (since 2018)
- Deutsche Telekom, member of the supervisory board (since 2017)
- HeidelbergCement, member of the supervisory board (since 2017)

=== Non-profit organizations ===
- German Federation of Chemical Employers’ Associations (BAVC), chairwoman (2013–2017)
- Hanns Martin Schleyer Foundation, member of the board of trustees
