= Association to Advance Collegiate Schools of Business =

American non-governmental organization

- Abbreviation: AACSB
- Formation: 1916; 110 years ago
- Type: Non-governmental organization
- Purpose: Educational accreditation
- Headquarters: Tampa, Florida, U.S.
- Members: Approximately 900 institutions
- President and CEO: Lily Bi
- Chairman of the board: Alexander Triantis
- Website: aacsb.edu
- Formerly called: American Assembly of Collegiate Schools of Business; International Association for Management Education; American Association of Collegiate Schools of Business

The Association to Advance Collegiate Schools of Business (AACSB) is an American professional and accreditation organization. It was founded as the American Assembly of Collegiate Schools of Business in 1916 to provide accreditation to business schools. AACSB is one of three business program accreditors.

Not all members of the association are accredited; the association also does not accredit for-profit schools. In 2019, the association received ISO 9001 certification. The association was once known as the American Association of Collegiate Schools of Business and as the International Association for Management Education.

== History ==
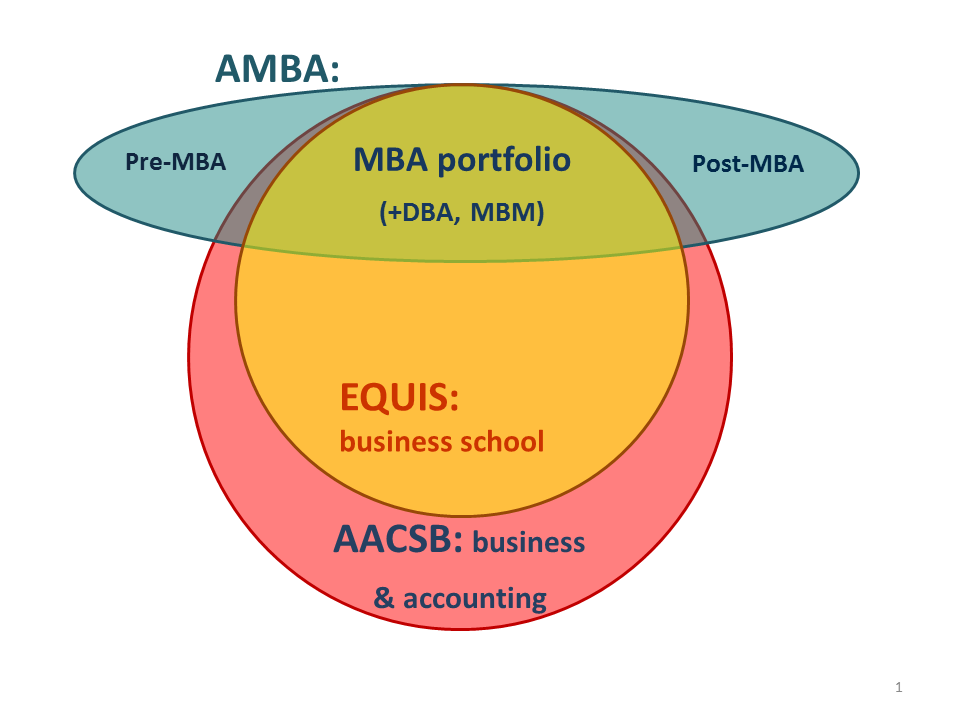
Scope of three business school accreditations, the Association to Advance Collegiate Schools of Business, EQUIS, and AMBA

The American Assembly of Collegiate Schools of Business was founded as an accrediting body in 1916 by a group of seventeen American universities and colleges. (Note: The founding institutions were Columbia University, Cornell University, Dartmouth College, Harvard University, New York University, Northwestern University, Ohio State University, Tulane University, the University of California, Berkeley, the University of Chicago, the University of Illinois at Urbana–Champaign, the University of Nebraska–Lincoln, the University of Pennsylvania, the University of Pittsburgh, the University of Texas at Austin, the University of Wisconsin–Madison and Yale University.) The first accreditations took place in 1919. For many years, the association accredited only American business schools, but in the latter part of the twentieth century adopted a more international approach to business education.

The first school it accredited outside the United States was the Alberta School of Business at the University of Alberta, in 1968; the first outside North America was the French business school ESSEC, in 1997; and the first outside North America and Europe was the King Fahd University of Petroleum and Minerals (KFUPM) Business School, in 2000. The present name of the association was adopted in 2001.

In January 2015, the Council for Higher Education Accreditation (CHEA) deferred recognition of the association pending satisfaction of its policy requirements, and in July its Committee on Recognition recommended that recognition be denied on the basis that the AACSB had consistently failed to document that it was routinely providing "reliable information to the public on their performance, including student achievement" as CHEA requires. In September 2016, the association withdrew from the council.

In 2019, it received ISO 9001 certification.

Since June 2023, the organization's president and chief executive officer has been Lily Bi, who was previously an executive at the Institute of Internal Auditors.

== See also ==
- Docnet
- List of AACSB-accredited schools
- European Quality Improvement System (EQUIS)
- Association of MBAs (AMBA)
