= Condor Films =

Swiss film and TV production company

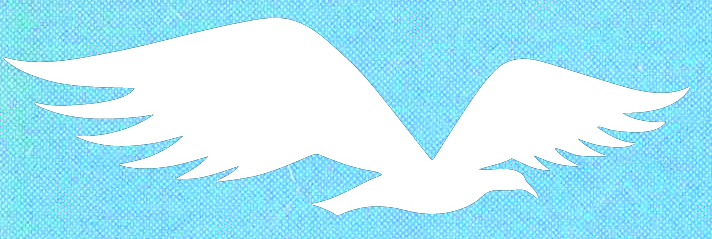
- Type: Corporation
- Industry: Media
- Founded: 1947
- Founder: Heinrich Fueter
- Headquarters: Zürich, Switzerland
- Key people: Kristian Widmer
- Products: Film, TV, Digital Media
- Divisions: Commercials, Entertainment, Film Services, Postproduction
- Subsidiaries: FaroTV
- Website: www.condorfilms.com www.farotv.ch

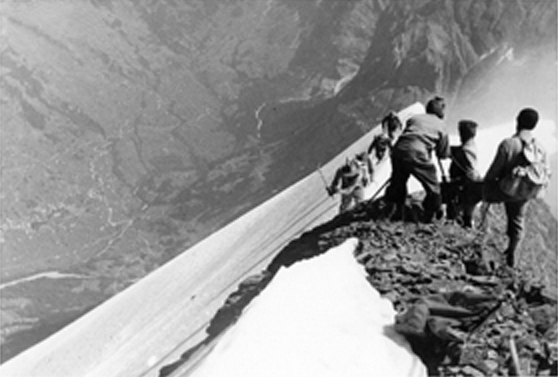
"Grat am Himmel" (1947)

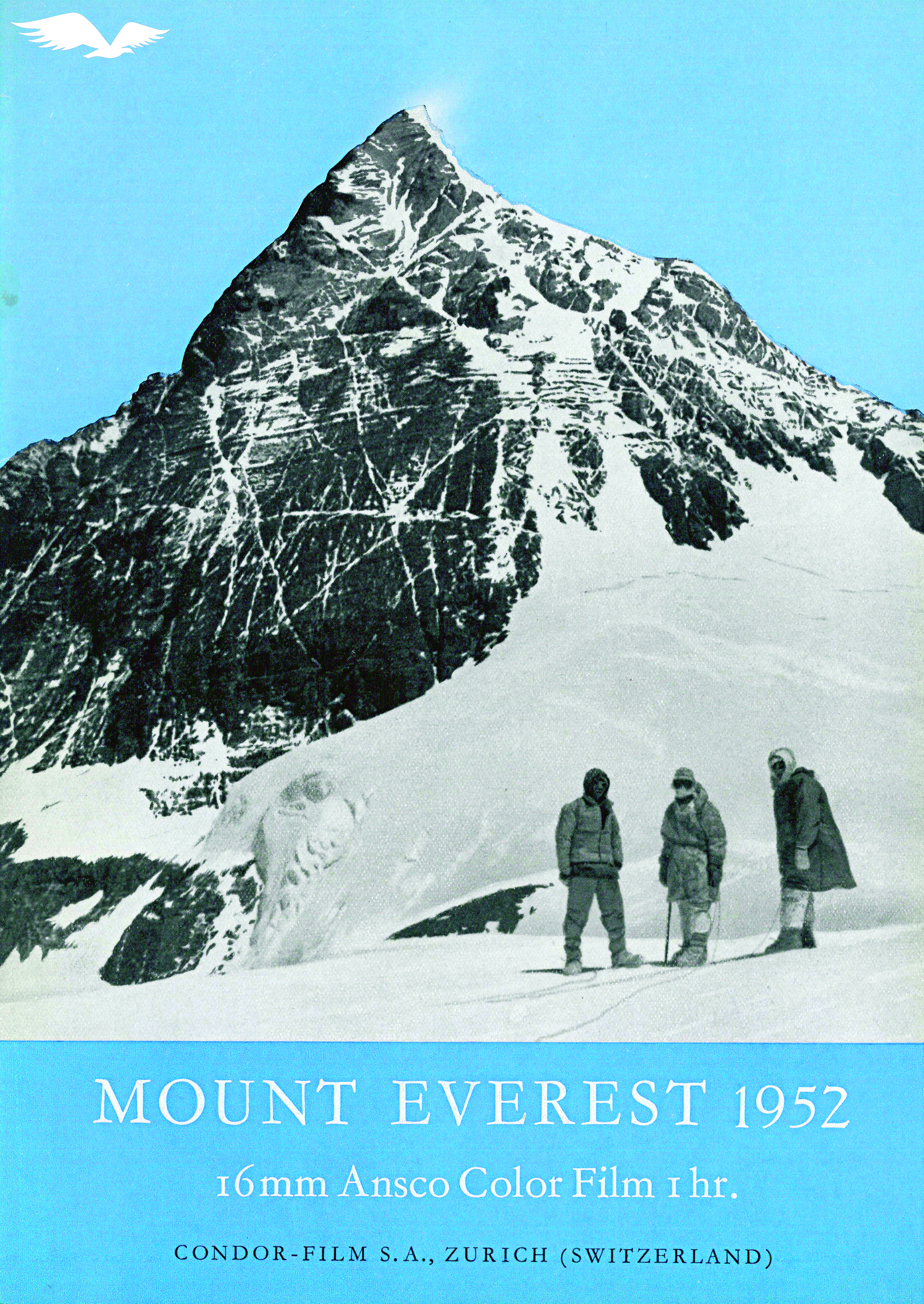

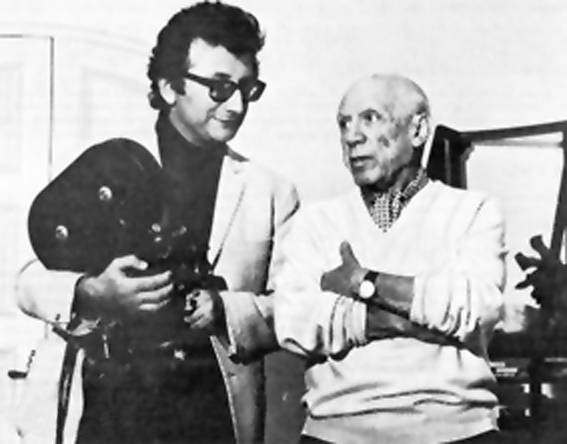
"Pablo Picasso" (1973)

Condor Films is a film and TV production company based in Zürich, Switzerland. The company produces commercials, documentary films, feature films, image films, product films and interactive multimedia solutions. The company is also known by the brands Condor Productions, Condor Communications, Condor Corporate, Condor Commercials, Studio Bellerive, Condor Features, Condor Audiovisuals, Condor Movies & Series and Condor Pictures as well as Condor Documentaries. In 2009 the group refocused marketing on its major brand Condor Films. Since 1972 it has been based at the Bellerive Studios in Zürich.

Condor Films is a founding member of The International Quorum of Motion Picture Producers IQMPP.

Not to be confused with Condor Films formerly located in St.Louis MO and later Memphis TN. a firm that produced American industrial training films, Commercial documentaries and commercials.

== History ==
Condor Films has produced more than 952 commercials, more than 237 corporate films for international companies and over 55 feature films. The company was awarded with an Academy Award for best foreign picture in 1991 for its feature film Journey of Hope by director Xavier Koller. Condor Films defines itself as a transmedia production company for moving images. It creates and produces audiovisual content for cinema, TV and the Internet.
Condor Films Ltd. was founded in 1947 by Dr. Heinrich Fueter. In 1964 the company was the first Swiss company to produce commercials. From 1987 to 2005. the Zürich-based media company Tamedia owned 70% of Condor Films. In 2005 the company was bought by a group centered around Managing Director Kristian Widmer in an MBO. In 2006 Condor Films bought 100% of FaroTV, a Swiss-based TV production company. In 2008, Kristian Widmer became the major shareholder.

== Filmography ==
Condor Films has produced:

- Commercials for Credit Suisse, UBS, Schweiz Tourismus, McDonald's, Fiat, Allianz, Orange, Feldschlösschen, Sinalco, Bicoflex, Axpo, SUVA, Sympany, Schauspielhaus Zürich, Swisscom, Emmi, Ricola and Migros,
- Sponsored films for Zurich Financial Services, Swiss Re, Chocolat Frey, KPMG, Geberit, Volkswagen, RUAG, Die Post, Swisslos, Swiss Life, Coop, Maurice Lacroix, Völkl, ICRC, BKW FMB Energie AG, Louis Widmer, Novartis, Adam Opel AG, Bank Vontobel, Sika AG, Danzas, Roche, Mettler Toledo, IWC Schaffhausen, BMW and ABB Group, Schweizer Grenzwachtkorps, University of Zurich, Swissair, Neue Aargauer Bank, Georg Fischer, SBB and Crossair,
- Interactive online applications for Gerber, PostFinance|Post Finance, and IWC Schaffhausen,
- Documentaries starring Roger Federer, Norman Foster, Pablo Picasso and studying the Mount-Everest-Expedition of 1952,
- Features for cinema and TV with Gérard Depardieu, Richard Chamberlain, Julian Sands, Anja Kling, Michael Gwisdek, Meret Becker, Lars Rudolph and with directors Daniel Schmid, Jan Švankmajer, Xavier Koller, Samir, Nicolas Gessner, Rolf Lyssy and Dani Levy,
- Short films for IWC Schaffhausen starring John Malkovich and Jean Reno
- Musicvideos with Carmen Electra and the Bloodhound Gang.
- Circlevision-, 4D-Motion-Simulator-, Vistavision-Dome and 70mm-films for Autostadt with directors Xavier Koller, Dani Levy, Michael Ballhaus, Ralph van Deusen, Christoph Silber and Michael Steiner, as well as for the Swiss National Exhibition Landesausstellung Expo.02
- 3D-Films for Paul Scherrer Institut PSI
- Product Placements und branded entertainment for Subaru, Charles Vögele, Helsana, Qualipet, Hills, Dyson, Gesundheitsförderung Schweiz and Weight Watchers.

Condor's TV unit "FaroTV" is involved in the creation and production of TV-shows such as

- "The HolidayCheckers", a TV show starring Tanja Gutmann
- "Joya Runs", a TV gameshow starring Andrea Jansen for Sat1 Schweiz,
- "Celebrations - Where are the Heroes", a TV show for Sat1 Schweiz,
- "Move-in!", a TV show starring Viola Tami for Sat1 Schweiz,
- "Chor auf Bewährung", a reality soap for Schweizer Fernsehen SF2,
- "Tierische Freunde", a TV series for Schweizer Fernsehen SF1,
- The Swiss primetime Saturday show "Happy Day", starring Roebi Koller for Schweizer Fernsehen SF1
- "Bauer ledig sucht", a TV series starring Marco Fritsche for TV Broadcaster 3plus
- the creation and production of the TV casting show "Einer wie Beni" starring Bernhard Thurnheer for Swiss Sport Television SSF.

== Awards ==
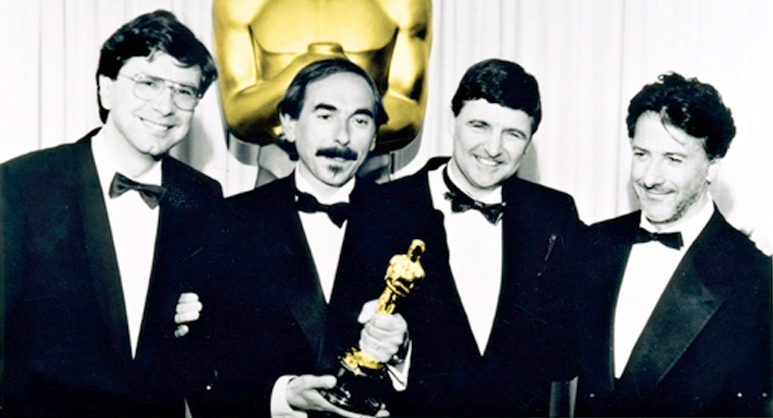
Academy Award (1991)

- 1991: Academy Award (Oscar) for Journey of Hope
- 2010: World Luxury Award, Gold Award for "Spirit of Navigation"
- 2011: Art Directors Club Switzerland, 5 Awards
- 2011: Cannes Lion for "More than Mountains" (Client: Swiss Tourism, Agency: Spillmann/Felser/Leo Burnett); Shortlisted for the Cannes Lions Film 'Craft' category for Camera in "More than Mountains"
