= Georges Kern =

German-Swiss businessman

- Born: Georges Kern; 25 January 1965 (age 61); Dusseldorf, Germany
- Education: Business Administration, University of St. Gallen, Switzerland

Georges Kern (born 25 January 1965) is a German-Swiss entrepreneur, who has been CEO of Swiss watchmaker Breitling since 2017.

== Career ==
Kern has worked at several positions throughout his career, beginning at Kraft Foods Switzerland. In 2002 he took a position as the CEO of IWC Schaffhausen, a watch company of the Richemont Group. In 2017, he became CEO of the watch company Breitling SA.

== Film production ==
Kern co-produced the French comedy film My Dog Stupid, released on October 31, 2019.

== Works ==
- Kern, Georges A. "Engineering the Intangible: Strategic Success Factors in the Luxury Watch Industry" (pages 153–180), Evolving Business Models. How CEOs Transform Traditional Companies, Springer International Publishing (2017) Editors: Franz, Christoph, Bieger, Thomas, Herrmann, Andreas (Eds.)
