= Ratschiller =

Ratschiller is a surname. Notable people with the surname include:

- Andreas Ratschiller (born 1983), Austrian ice hockey player
- Ludwig-Karl Ratschiller (1921–2004), Italian anti-Nazi partisan
- Marco Ratschiller, Editor in Chief of Nebelspalter
- Tobias Ratschiller, founder of the software company Maguma and original author of phpMyAdmin
