= Walter Lesch =

Swiss stage and movie producer-director and writer

- Born: Bernhard Walter Lesch; 4 March 1898; Zürich, Switzerland
- Died: 27 May 1958 (aged 60); Küsnacht, Switzerland
- Education: Zürich
- Occupations: Stage & screen director Actor; Dramaturge; Writer; Cabaret owner/director
- Spouse: Mathilde Danegger
- Parent(s): Bernhard Robert Lesch; Hermine Elisabeta Ranschenbach

Walter Lesch (4 March 1898 – 27 May 1958) was a Swiss stage and movie producer-director. He was also a writer and, for nearly twenty years after 1933, artistic director of the anti-Nazi Cabaret Cornichon.

== Life ==
Bernhard Walter Lesch was born into a protestant family in Zürich. Bernhard Robert Lesch, his father, was a painter. He attended a commercially oriented secondary school and then moved on to the University of Zurich where he studied Germanistics, history and philosophy. His time as a student also took him to Bern, Geneva and Berlin, but in 1922 it was back at the University of Zurich where he received his doctorate. His dissertation concerned "the problem of Tragedy [in the work of] Gerhart Hauptmann" ("Das Problem der Tragik bei Gerhart Hauptmann"). He then spent several years travelling to Paris, Berlin, Rome and Paris, working variously as a salesman, a journalist and a private tutor. He worked between 1926 and 1928 as a dramaturge and producer at the "Theater in der Klosterstraße" on the edge of Berlin and then settled for a further year in Vienna where he supported himself through writing.

Returning to Switzerland, he premiered several of his own light dramas and comedies, such as "Du kannst mich nicht verlassen" ("You can't leave me"), at the Zurich Playhouse ("Schauspielhaus"), where he also staged "Bei Kerzenlicht" ("By candlelight") by Siegfried Geyer and "Reiner Tisch" ("Spring Cleaning") by Frederick Lonsdale. He then moved back to Berlin where he worked as a screenwriter. He returned again to Switzerland - this time permanently - in 1932. The focus of his film work between 1932 and 1935 was on advertising films and as a movie producer with Praesens-Film in Zürich. In 1933 he teamed up with Richard Schweizer: together they co-wrote and co-produced "Wie d’Wahrheit würkt" (loosely "How the truth operates"), the first sound film produced in Switzerland to be scripted not in German but in a version of Swiss German. Another joint production for Praesens-Film, this time created in collaboration with Leopold Lindtberg, was the so-called "dialect comedy" Jä-soo! (1935).

In 1933 Lesch was a co-founder with Otto Weissert of the Cabaret Cornichon. (Note: "Cornichon" is a French word for a gherkin, such as might have been offered as a bar snack) He became director of the new cabaret, which was inspired by and to some extent modelled on the Pfeffermühle ("Pepper mill") cabaret opened a few months earlier, in Munich. At a time when politics were becoming increasingly polarised, and many of the political trends seemed to be pointing in a wrong direction, Lesch was clear that he could not opt out of public debate: "The humorist who does not remain a moralist will be left trading only in sensation and farce" (Der Humorist, der nicht ein Moralist bleibt, wird zum Possenreisser und Geschäftemacher"). As the Cornichon's artistic director he did not hesitate to include material critical of the fascist states by which Switzerland was surrounded on almost three sides, to the north, east and south. But programmes also incorporated a social-critical tone directed at political targets even closer to home. During the Cornichon years Lesch wrote more than 400 "Chanson-style" songs for the cabaret. Some of the verses were published in two volumes which appeared in 1937 ("Cornichons. Verse aus dem Cabaret Cornichon") and 1945 ("Das Cornichon-Buch").

Even now, the Cabaret Cornichon did not absorb all his energy. On 14 November 1935 his stage play, "Cäsar in Rüblikon", had its premier at the Zurich Playhouse ("Schauspielhaus") in a production directed by Leopold Lindtberg. Like his film "Jä-soo!", the stage piece was a "dialect comedy", which connected its diverse elements with a consistent antifascist theme: the inhabitants of Rüblikon get rid of their Minister-president who has become a despot after the German model.

In 1938 Lesch was placed in charge of theatrical presentations for the 1939 Swiss Federal Exhibition. He tried - with little success - to promote politically critical pieces such as Werner Johannes Guggenheim's anti-Nazi "Erziehung zum Menschen" (loosely "Educating people"). Nor was his own submission, entitled "Die kleine grosse Schweiz" (loosely "Little big Switzerland"), accepted for performance.

By the later 1940s many of the old political targets of the Cabaret Cornichon were gone. The continent - Switzerland included - was exhausted and appetite for political satire diminished. Those who had invested in the cabaret had moved on, and Lesch was left to shoulder the entire burden of its growing indebtedness. In 1951 the Cabaret Cornichon closed down.

During the 1950s Walter Lesch worked as an advertising copywriter, while continuing to write for the theatre. Probably his most notable theatrical contribution from this period was the text (in Swiss German) for Paul Burkhard's die Kleine Niederdorfoper which had its premier on 31 December 1951 at the Schauspielhaus Zürich.

== Personal ==
Around 1930 Walter Lesch teamed up with and married the Austrian born actress Mathilde Danegger. A staunch antifascist, after 1933 she was for practical purposes confined, as a German-language stage performer, to Switzerland. She took part in political cabaret, between 1934 and 1938, appearing regularly with the Cornichon. The couple's daughter, the actress Karin Lesch, was born in 1935. The marriage broke down progressively during the early 1940s, and Mathilde, who had met Herbert Crüger in 1939 and at some stage had married him as her third husband, moved to Germany in 1947, taking Karin with her, after which Lesch was cut off from his daughter.
