= Ted Scapa =

Dutch-Swiss illustrator and publisher

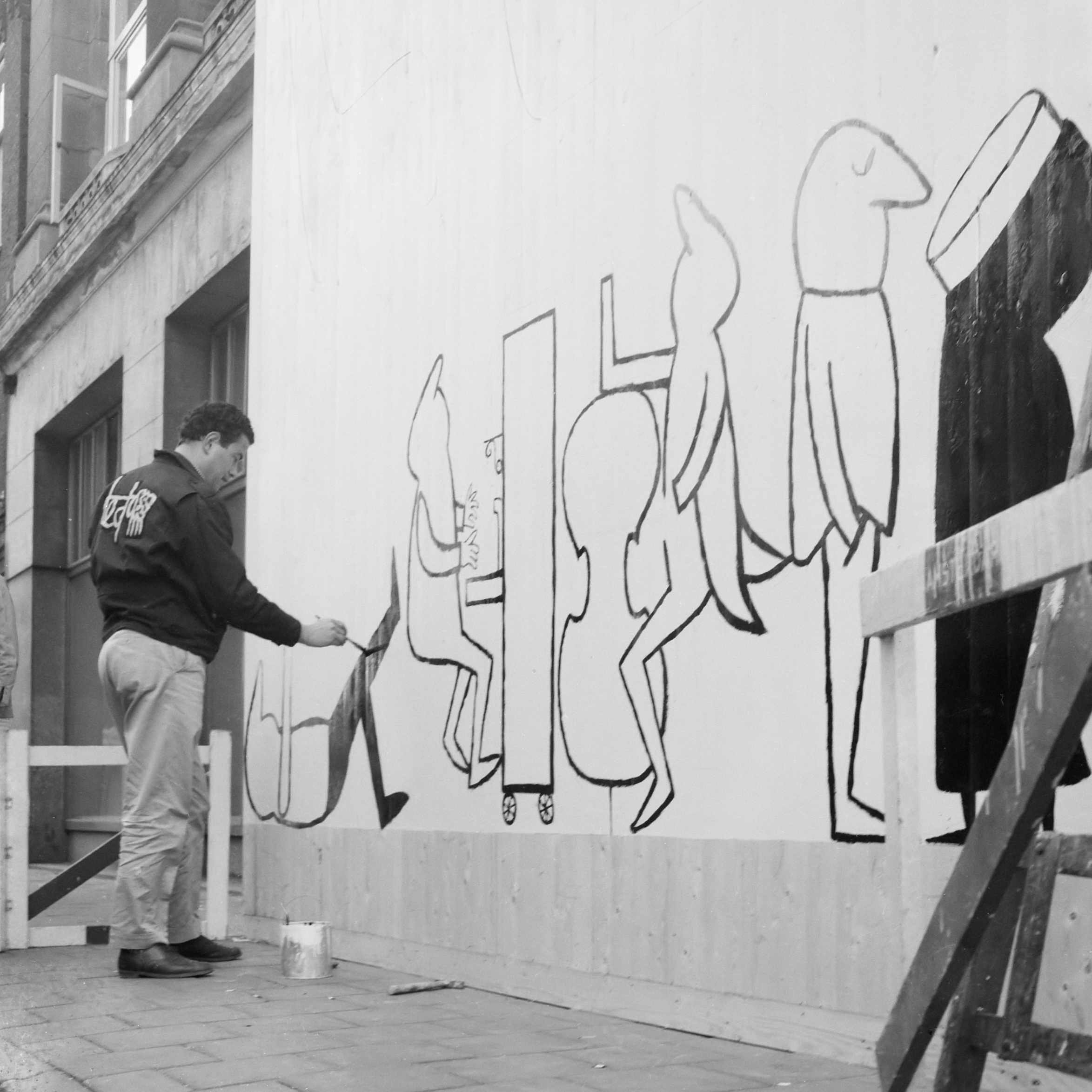
- Scapa in 1961
- Born: Eduard Schaap; 17 January 1931; Amsterdam, Netherlands
- Died: 6 December 2023 (aged 92); Bern, Switzerland
- Occupations: Illustrator, publisher, television presenter, painter, sculptor, designer
- Spouse: Meret Meyer

Ted Scapa (born Eduard Schaap; 17 January 1931 – 6 December 2023) was a Dutch-born Swiss illustrator, publisher, television presenter, and artist. He directed the Bern-based art publishing house Benteli from 1962 to 1991 and hosted children's programming on Swiss German-language television. He was widely known for his humorous cartoons, which appeared in Swiss and international publications.

== Biography ==
Scapa was born in Amsterdam to Jacques Schaap, a diplomat, and Paula (née Erdtsieck). He trained at the Royal Academy of Art in The Hague. In 1962 he emigrated to Switzerland, and in the same year took over the direction of Benteli, which he developed into an art publishing house with an international scope, leading the firm until 1991. He acquired Bernese citizenship in 1973. That year he also married Meret Meyer, daughter of the publisher Hans Meyer-Benteli.

From 1967, Scapa presented children's programs on Swiss German-language television, notably Spielhaus, in which he hosted the segment Zeichnen mit Scapa ("Drawing with Scapa"). He was the author of numerous comic strips and children's books, and his cartoons appeared regularly in the Swiss and international press, including Der Nebelspalter and Die Weltwoche. His humorous drawings are characterized by his keen observation of people in everyday situations. From 1992 onward, he also worked as a painter, sculptor, and designer.

== Bibliography ==
E. Billeter, Scapa, 2002.
