= Von Arx =

Von Arx is a surname. Notable people with the surname include:

- Cäsar von Arx (1895–1949), Swiss dramatist
- Casimir von Arx (1852–1931), Swiss politician
- Heinrich von Arx (1802–1858), Swiss draftsman and painter
- Jan von Arx (born 1978), Swiss ice hockey player
- Jeffrey P. von Arx (born 1944), American academic
- Kurt von Arx (born 1937), Swiss field hockey player
- Reto Von Arx (born 1976), Swiss ice hockey player
