= Albert Ehrismann =

Swiss poet (1908–1998)

- Born: 20 September 1908; Zurich, Switzerland
- Died: 10 February 1998 (aged 89); Zurich, Switzerland
- Occupations: Poet; writer
- Spouse: Annelies Angehrn
- Parents: Albert Ehrismann (father); Emma Suter (mother)
- Awards: Conrad Ferdinand Meyer Prize (1940); Literature prize of the city of Zurich (1978)

Albert Ehrismann (20 September 1908 – 10 February 1998) was a Swiss poet. A trained bookkeeper, he began to write when he became unemployed in 1929. In 1934 he co-founded the Cabaret Cornichon, and from 1952 he wrote popular socially critical poems for the Nebelspalter. Like hardly any other poet of his generation, he kept to thematically topical and formally innovative work beyond the period of spiritual national defense.

== Biography ==
Albert Ehrismann was born on 20 September 1908 in Zurich, the son of Albert Ehrismann, a warehouseman, and Emma (née Suter), a linen seamstress. He married Annelies Angehrn.

A trained bookkeeper, Ehrismann began to write when he became unemployed in 1929. His first collection of poems, Lächeln auf dem Asphalt (1930), and the volume Schiffern und Kapitänen (1932), which he wrote while serving a prison sentence as a conscientious objector, show his social and humanitarian outlook and his ability to write assured verse in both traditional and modern forms. In 1934 he co-founded the Cabaret Cornichon. From 1952 he wrote popular socially critical poems for the Nebelspalter. Because he needed the income, he also worked for the advertising industry.

Like hardly any other poet of his generation, Ehrismann was able to keep to thematically topical and formally innovative work beyond the period of spiritual national defense (Geistige Landesverteidigung). He received the Conrad Ferdinand Meyer Prize in 1940 and the literature prize of the city of Zurich in 1978. He died on 10 February 1998 in Zurich.

== Works ==
- Lächeln auf dem Asphalt, 1930
- Schiffern und Kapitänen, 1932
- Der neue Kolumbus, 1939
- Der letzte Brief, 1948
- Ein ganz gewöhnlicher Tag, 1954
- Riesenrad der Sterne, 1960
- Eine Art Bilanz, 1965
- Gegen Ende des zweiten Jahrtausends, 1988

== Bibliography ==
- Der Bund, 7 March 1998 (culture supplement)
