= Herbert Crüger =

German political activist (1911–2003)

- Born: 17 May 1911; Berlin, Germany
- Died: 17 January 2003 (aged 91); Zeuthen, Brandenburg, Germany
- Occupations: Political activist Resistance activist Party official University teacher
- Political party: KPD; SED; PDS
- Spouse: Mathilde Danegger
- Children: Karin Lesch (step daughter)

Herbert Crüger (17 May 1911 – 17 January 2003) was a German political activist and politician (KPD) who, as a young man during the Nazi years, became caught up in espionage activity. During the postwar decade, as the division of Germany seemed to have become permanent, millions of people fled from East Germany to West Germany. More unusually, Herbert Crüger was one of those who, having ended up in "the west", crossed the internal frontier in the other direction, probably, at least in part, because his communist politics made it hard for him to obtain suitable employment in the west. In the east, he became a university lecturer and author. In 1958, he fell foul of a political purge and spent some years in the vast Bautzen penitentiary. He was released in 1961 but had to wait until 1990 for his formal rehabilitation.

== Biography ==
Herbert Crüger was born in Berlin-Rixdorf. (Note: The Rixdorf quarter of Berlin became part of Berlin-Neukölln in 1912.) His father worked as a book printer, but died in September 1914 after an intestinal operation. His mother, widowed with three boys aged three, six and seven, always blamed the sloppiness of the nurses for her husband's relatively early death. The outbreak of war a couple of months earlier was already placing increased pressure on medical services. Herbert was the three-year-old boy. The boys' mother came from a peasant family that before the mass urbanization of the late nineteenth century had been settled for many generations in Sadenbeck (Prignitz). By the time the war ended Herbert Crüger was seven. It was around this time that a doctor pronounced him anemic, after which he was fed every day with a fresh raw egg garnished with sugar. Food was desperately short supply at this time, but the family already kept several hens in their Berlin apartment, which was less remarkable at that time than it would become subsequently. He attended school locally. Because of their financial situation, there were no school fees to pay; but his brothers had left school as soon as allowed in order to contribute to the family's budget. Herbert was impatient to do the same. When he left school he was still too young to join the navy, so he joined the merchant navy as a ship's boy ("Schiffsjunge") after his Uncle Adolf and Aunt Anna had helped him convince his mother to let him go. But in October 1927 he turned up at the home of two cousins in Hamburg, clutching a small suitcase containing a couple of shirts and underwear. Uncle Friedrich, his Hamburg relative, knew a "Heuerbaas" (maritime jobs agent), a small man with a beard who spoke no German but only the Hamburg dialect. (Note: A "Heuerbaas" was a jobs-broker who worked for the captains of merchant ships.)

Back on dry land, between 1928 and 1931 Crüger undertook, and completed, a commercial apprenticeship with "Deutsche Fiat Automobil Verkauf s-A.-G.", a major car dealership. The period was one of widespread economic depression, however, and for Crüger the apprenticeship was followed by unemployment. By 1931 he was a member of the Hitler Youth. Crüger was an admirer of Otto Strasser, a senior National Socialist Party member long regarded as the leading figure on the party's anti-capitalist social-revolutionary left-wing. Although it is hard to avoid the suspicion that Herbert Crüger's own autobiography, published in 1997 with the benefit of more than half a century of hindsight, may have been a little selective in its recall of the long-running struggle between the Strasser faction and the hate-driven Hitlerite faction of the Berlin-Neukölln Hitler Youth group, it is beyond dispute that shortly after Otto Strasser's forced resignation from the National Socialist Party, and after failing to create a breakaway Strasserite faction of it, Herbert Crüger, resigned with like-minded friends from the Hitler Youth group. In 1932 he joined the Young Communists.

Almost immediately, he joined the Rote Jungfront, which was the youth section of what amounted to the paramilitary wing of the Communist Party. During 1932/33 he worked as a "technical" (i.e. military) leader with the Red Front Fighters ("Roter Frontkämpferbund" / "Rote Jungfront") for the organisation's Berlin-Neukölln sub-district. For a couple of months during the summer in 1933 he left Berlin to stay on a farm and work with the Landvolkbewegung (loosely "National Peasants' and Farmers' movement") in East Prussia. At the start of that year the National Socialists had taken power and almost immediately transformed Germany into a one-party dictatorship. Non-Nazi political activism was banned. The Landvolkbewegung had many of the characteristics of a political party and Crüger's involvement with it was illegal.

Although the Sturmabteilung (SA) is largely remembered as a paramilitary branch of the National Socialist Party it was, especially before 1934 strongly influenced by communist ideology. Not all the young people who had been enthusiastic backers of Otto Strasser had left the movement when Strasser was expelled from the National Socialist Party. This gave rise to the use of the term "Beefsteak Nazis" (brown - Nazi - on the outside but red - Communist - in the inside). Contemporary estimates varied widely, but it is likely that during the early 1930s at least 20% of the SA membership comprised these so-called "Beefsteak Nazis". That provides context for the reference in sources to Crüger having worked inside the SA for the "M-Apparat", a shadowy organisation which operated as an intelligence service on behalf of the (after 1933 illegal) Communist Party. Elsewhere there are indications that his role was involved more with proselytising than with intelligence gathering. Always an incorrigible networker, he inveigled his way into National Socialist student groups to urge a critical assessment of the party leadership "which in its practical politics [had since taking power] ... backed off from much of what it had hitherto been promising". He was able to distribute to his SA comrades political leaflets, prepared for him, which in his words "picked up on the current opinion in the SA .... and demanded to know who the real enemies were, the Communist workers or the big capitalists".

At the beginning of August 1934, as he met a comrade by the entrance of a function they were attending at the "Haus Vaterland", a large restaurant in the Potsdamer Platz, the two of them were surrounded by four men and detained. It was immediately obvious that they had been arrested by the Gestapo and that it would not be possible to escape. The men suggested going for a discussion to a café on the corner where it would be quieter, but once they had all started walking they continued on to the Reich Security Main Office in what was then known as Prince Abrecht Street ("Prinz-Albrecht-Straße"). The small one-person cells in which each of them were placed had barely enough space for the flatbed and bucket with which they were furnished. Crüger had in his back trouser pocket between eight and ten thin paper sheets of "illegal material". The bucket was empty and clean so that if he tore up the papers and threw them in it, they would undoubtedly be retrieved and examined. He had only just finished eating his papers when he heard a key in the door and a guard appeared, indicating with a nod that Crüger should follow him to a larger cell where a couple of SS officers were waiting to question him., In the end, Herbert Crüger was held in investigatory detention between August 1934 and July 1935. However, there is no mentioned of his having faced any sort of formal trial.

In November 1935, he was able to flee to Czechoslovakia where he based himself in Prague and, starting in 1936, resumed his activities for the "M-Apparat" (Communist Party intelligence service). It was in Prague, still in 1935, that he joined the Communist Party of Germany. By 1937, he was in Barcelona, working for the intelligence services of the Second Spanish Republic during the Spanish Civil War. He returned to Prague in 1938, but moved on again in September, presumably in connection with the incremental German occupation. By the time he arrived in Zürich he had acquired a Czechoslovak identity and was using the name "Josef Novák". The real Josef Novák had been killed while fighting in the Spanish Civil War, identified, in the passport, as a painter.

Using his Czechoslovak identity, he now embarked on the study of Art History and Archeology in Zürich where he was permitted to attend lectures as a "guest student" ("Gasthörer"). Both his chosen subjects were, he believed, consistent with at least one version of Josef Novák's stated occupation as a "painter", (Note: The Czechoslovak passport definitions were given in both Czechoslovak and French. The Swiss police department responsible for monitoring foreigners used the French version. In French, the word for "painter" has the same ambiguity as to the English equivalent.) and both were safely non-political. Zürich had become home to many German political exiles, especially from the worlds of arts and entertainment, and his exile there enabled Crüger to re-establish several former friendships and to cultivate some new ones. In March 1939 he moved out of the little guest house where he had been staying and teamed up with the actress Mathilde Danegger whom he had seen on stage when she was appearing with the Cabaret Cornichon. (A mutual friend working at the cabaret ticket office had engineered an introduction between the two after asking Crüger which of the girls appearing on the stage he found most attractive.) Crüger and Danegger subsequently married, probably during the mid-1940s. Through Danegger he met a number of other exiled German stage performers. Active in her support for the German Communist Party, she was well connected with various individuals who would become members of the arts and cultural establishment in the German Democratic Republic after 1949.

During the early summer of 1940, rumours began to circulate that the German army was about to invade France. It seemed unlikely that the invasion would take place across the Franco-German border which was well defended, but in Switzerland there was a belief that the Germans might seek to invade either through Belgium to the north or through Switzerland to the south. A precautionary general mobilisation of the Swiss army took place in September 1939 and during the early months of 1940 many Zürchers moved south and east towards Ticino and Graubünden, believing the higher mountains would offer greater safety than the relatively flat central belt of the country. The German invasion of France, when it came in May/June 1940, used the northern route, but the Swiss government remained intensely nervous, and during 1940s Crüger and Danegger made plans to try and emigrate to Mexico, where they had contacts or to the United States of America. But then the message came through from the party leadership that members of the German Communist Party exiled in Switzerland should stay in Switzerland. This put an end to their plans to escape across the Atlantic. During the Summer of 1940, the Swiss authorities prepared a number of labour camps: the plan was to intern all able-bodied foreign residents and set them to work in the national interest. In September 1940 Crüger was sent to the Felsberger Labour Camp near Chur, in Graubünden. In Felsberg he became part of a labour gang of between 120 and 150 people set to build a supposedly strategic road. Most of the gang were Jews who had escaped from Nazi Germany or Austria. A handful of the labourers had fled Germany because they were communists.

Keen to regain his freedom, Crüger believed he should plead the need to continue with his university studies at Zürich. Characteristically, he turned to a contact. He had never been a diligent participant at the Archeology classes held by Prof. Otto Waser at the university but nevertheless sensed that Waser might be willing and able to help. He was right. Although Waser barely knew him, the professor addressed a powerful letter to the relevant government department insisting that Crüger must be released as a matter of the greatest urgency in order that he might progress his studies. Waser's motivation was primarily that he was a decent man, deeply opposed to the government policy of sending foreigners off to labour camps. Waser was also a senior and respected academic figure. Switzerland was still a relatively democratic country: Waser's letter could not be simply swept under the table. Faced with the resulting political pressures the police department agreed that Crüger could be released from the camp ahead of the next term, although up until then he was required to remain in detention. Nevertheless, freedom was not uninterrupted: during the years until 1945 he had to endure a further four periods in a succession of Swiss labour camps, each time for a duration of approximately three months.

From 1942 Crüger was able to be open about his membership of the Communist Party of Germany and 1943 he took on responsibility for publishing a Swiss version of the journal of the Moscow backed Movement for a Free Germany ("Bewegung Freies Deutschland"). During 1944 and 1945 he actively built up support for the Free Germany movement in Swiss labour camps, and held a position as Swiss Secretary for the movement until it was dissolved at the end of 1945. By that time war had ended, formally in May 1945, leaving the western two thirds of Germany divided into four military occupation zones. In January 1946 Herbert Crüger returned to Germany, settling not in his former home city of Berlin, but in the US occupation zone, further to the west. Between 1946 and 1948 he served as a senior official (Regierungsrat) with responsibilities covering youth welfare in the Ministry for Labour and welfare in the newly relaunched regional state of Hesse. His position became anomalous after regional elections were held in December 1946 in which the Communist Party performed badly and following which they accordingly withdrew from the collaborative arrangements with the regional SPD which had until that point been in place. It was more than a year later before the party instructed Crüger to resign from his government post, which he did on 31 January 1948.

Between 1948 and 1950, Crüger served as the second secretary of the regional Communist Party for Württemberg. In December 1950 he was excluded from the party, however. Sources suggest that this may have been in connection with his adherence to Strasserism twenty years earlier. It is also possible that party bosses objected to Crüger's friendship with Erich Wollenberg who had managed to escape from Moscow in 1938 despite being summarily identified by the Soviet party authorities as a Trotskyite and enemy of the people. The shifting of tectonic political plates, whereby the Soviet occupation zone had been relaunched as the German Democratic Republic in October 1949, five months after the French, British and American occupation zones had been pushed together and relaunched as the German Federal Republic may also have played their part in as much as they confirmed that the division of Germany into two states allied to two militarily competing power blocks. When Herbert Crüger fell from grace at the end of 1950 the party condemned him as a "Westemigrant": his decision not to settle in the Soviet occupation zone back in 1946 now counted against him.

In March 1951, Crüger relocated to East Germany. This was in response to the orders from the regional party authorities. He made the move despite the warnings from his friend Erich Wollenberg that within the East German political establishment he was likely to be viewed with some suspicion both on account of the time he had spent in the west and on account of his sometimes free-spirited outbursts. His wife, who during this period was appearing as a theatre actress on stages both in the west and in the east, was also permanently resident in East Germany by 1953, the border between the two halves of Germany had become progressively less porous. Between 1951 and 1953, Crüger was based at Rostock undertaking an Aspirantur (post-graduate studies) in Archeology.

Between 1953 and 1958, he taught social-sciences at Berlin University, initially at the faculty of veterinary medicine and subsequently in the philosophical faculty's section for dialectical and historical materialism. He was responsible for a cohort of approximately 120 students who attended his lectures and seminars associated with the course. He later wrote that he encouraged a living understanding of Marxism as a theory in need of further development, and discouraged a tendency to see Stalinism as the definitive version of it. Joseph Stalin's death on 5 March 1953 did not lead to an outburst of liberalism east of the "Iron Curtain", but in some of the quieter recesses of people's homes and in the universities there seems to have been some relaxation of the taboo on questioning aspects of Stalin's record. Three months later the East German uprising was little reported in the west and rapidly (and brutally) suppressed on the ground, but it deeply shook the confidence of the East German ruling establishment. The authorities immediately let it be known that the uprising had been a counter-revolutionary outburst, but its timing, directly after an increase of the number of hours in the standard working week, and in the context of entrenched postwar austerity, persuaded Crüger that sufficient explanation for the mass action by the workers on the city streets, most notably in Berlin, did not need the support of some underlying tortuous political conspiracy theory. In July 1953, reports came through of the arrest of the longstanding Soviet Interior Minister Lavrentiy Beria which had taken place the previous month in Moscow. Even the East German mass-circulation daily newspaper, Neues Deutschland carried as a headline the term "schaedliche Personenkult" ("shameful personality cult") in connection with reports of changes at the top of the party hierarchy in Moscow, although in the article that followed the newspaper stopped short of identifying the personality by name. Crüger did not think that in his own social-sciences teaching he could simply leave out an analysis of the Neues Deutschland article in particular and the role of Stalin more generally.

The authorities were evidently content that Crüger's teaching in the aftermath of the 1953 uprising should remain "under the radar", but his response to First Secretary Khruschev's very long "secret speech", delivered to the 20th Congress of the Communist Party of the Soviet Union during the final week of February 1956, which gave details of "Stain's crimes" and was informally disseminated across East Germany during 1956 and 1957, eventually triggered a political nemesis. While the East German government initially sought to downplay the entire matter, Crüger was one of those who sought to engage in sometimes heated discussions about the issues raised in political meetings organized by and on behalf of the party at the university and cultural institutions with which he was involved. He urged that political discussions at the university should not be suppressed, with a particular focus on Heinrich Saar, the newly appointed director of the university institute at which he worked, who was known to have been an anti-Nazi activist and a victim of political persecution during the Hitler years. He urged an overcoming of the dogmatic resistance of the party against attempts to broaden democratic practices within it. Discussions never reached the stage of concrete irrevocable proposals, however. was also outspoken in his criticism of the re-arrest of his academic colleague Bernhard Steinberger in November 1956 and the official strategy of savage press defamation to which Steinberger was then subjected by the government. On 5 December 1956, Crüger even addressed a letter to the Party Central Committee in which he argued Steinberger's case and insisted on his innocence. The latter was marked for the personal attention of the national leader (and first-party secretary), Walter Ulbricht.

Steinberger was one of those who had been arrested along with Wolfgang Harich who had been promoting the advantages of socialism with a human face. In the eyes of the authorities Crüger's determined attempts to defend Steinberger confirmed his role as one of those intellectuals who represented a threat to the government. At the party's Third Universities Conference, which took place between 28 February and 2 March 1958, under the slogan "Clarity through conflict. On the successful battles against unMarxist opinions", (Note: "Klarheit durch Auseinandersetzung. Vom erfolgreichen Kampf gegen unmarxistische Anschauungen") Crüger and his former institute director, Heinrich Saar, were the focus of a sustained political attack. Later during March 1958 Crüger himself became the last victim of a series of arrests and show trials against "reformist intellectuals". He was arrested by officials from the Ministry for State Security (Stasi) and held in investigatory custody at the Stasi detention centre in Berlin-Hohenschönhausen until December of that year. In December 1958 he faced a secret trial. Found guilty of "High Treason" ("schwere Staatsverrat") he was sentenced to eight years imprisonment. His official status as a victim of National Socialist persecution was revoked. Following conviction he was transferred to the Bautzen penitentiary. Walter Janka, Wolfgang Harich and other members of what was by now being identified as "the [Harich] group" were already being held at the facility. Meanwhile, President Pieck had died in the late summer of 1960 and Walter Ulbricht had become, in effect, head of state as well as being head of the government. By now the government nervousness that had surged after 1953 was beginning to abate. Early in 1960 Mathilde Danegger, still making frequent appearances on East German cinema and television screens and still regarded by the authorities as relatively "reliable", sent a letter to Ulbricht, pleading for mercy (ein "Gnadengesuch") on behalf of her husband. The letter was positively received. The eight-year sentence was reduced to five years. Then, having regard to the fact that two thirds of the five-year sentence had already been served, at Easter 1961 Crüger was released on probation. The next year his official status as a victim of National Socialist persecution was reinstated.

There was at this stage no question of returning to his former position at Berlin University. Instead, following his release, Herbert Crüger was employed as a research assistant at the (East) German Academy of Sciences. Crüger also worked at the Institute for Economic History as a researcher for Jürgen Kuczynski, an economist of such intellectual and political eminence that, remarkably, the authorities never presumed to cast aspersions on his sometimes off-beat conclusions on the East German reality of Soviet-style Marxism. Possibly because, as a longstanding member of the Communist Party of Germany, he thought it unnecessary when he immigrated in 1951, Herbert Crüger had at this point still never joined East Germany's ruling Socialist Unity Party ("Sozialistische Einheitspartei Deutschlands" / SED). He did so in 1966.

During the changes that assumed a new momentum in 1989 and then, in 1990, led to reunification, Herbert Crüger was formally rehabilitated on 2 May 1989 through a court of Cassation decision which reversed the court decision that had led to his imprisonment in 1958/59, and which also gave legal effect to his political rehabilitation. Fittingly, just over two weeks later East Germany held its first free and fair parliamentary election. As the old SED (party) struggled to reinvent itself for a democratic future, he also lost very little time in joining its successor organisation, the Party of Democratic Socialism (PDS). By now well past normal retirement age and based just outside Berlin he also became a member of the executive of the local Königs Wusterhausen branch of the "Interessenverband ehemaliger Teilnehmer am antifaschistischen Widerstand, Verfolgter des Naziregimes und Hinterbliebener, kurz Interessenverband der Verfolgten des Naziregimes" (IVVdN), a relaunched version of the old East German Union of Persecutees of the Nazi Regime ("Vereinigung der Verfolgten des Naziregimes" / VVN).
