= Die Glatzkopfbande =

1963 film

- Directed by: Richard Groschopp
- Release date: 1963
- Country: East Germany
- Language: German

Die Glatzkopfbande is an East German film. It was released in 1963.

== Casts ==
- Ulrich Thein: Leutnant Lothar Czernik
- Erik S. Klein: Abschnittsbevollmächtigter
- Thomas Weisgerber: King
- Rolf Römer: Johle
- Arno Wyzniewski: Conny
- Jürgen Rothert: Schnuppi
- Karl-Richard Schmidt: Grandpa
- Jürgen Pörschmann: Piepel
- Günter Meier: Wildschwein
- Peter Pollatschek: Stinker
- Herbert Graedtke: Warze
- Paul Berndt: Helmut Ritter
- Brigitte Krause: Kirsten Köster
- Erika Dunkelmann: Frau Pohl
- Jutta Wachowiak: Marianne Pohl
- Klaus Gendries: Leutnant Hansen
- Hans Knötzsch: Objektleiter Winter
- Gerhard Lau: Bauleiter
- Mathilde Danegger: Piepels grandma
- Steffie Spira: grandma of mother
- Horst Friedrich: grandpa of dad
- Otto Zedler: Meister Kranich
- Monika Hildebrand: Waltraud
- Jochen Diestelmann: Bauspezialist der Kripo
- Hans Hardt-Hardtloff: Wohnlagerverwalter
- Annelies Edenharter: Fernschreiberin
