= Weinegg =

Quarter of the city of Zurich, Switzerland

Coordinates: 47°21′29″N 8°33′54″E

- Quarter of Zurich
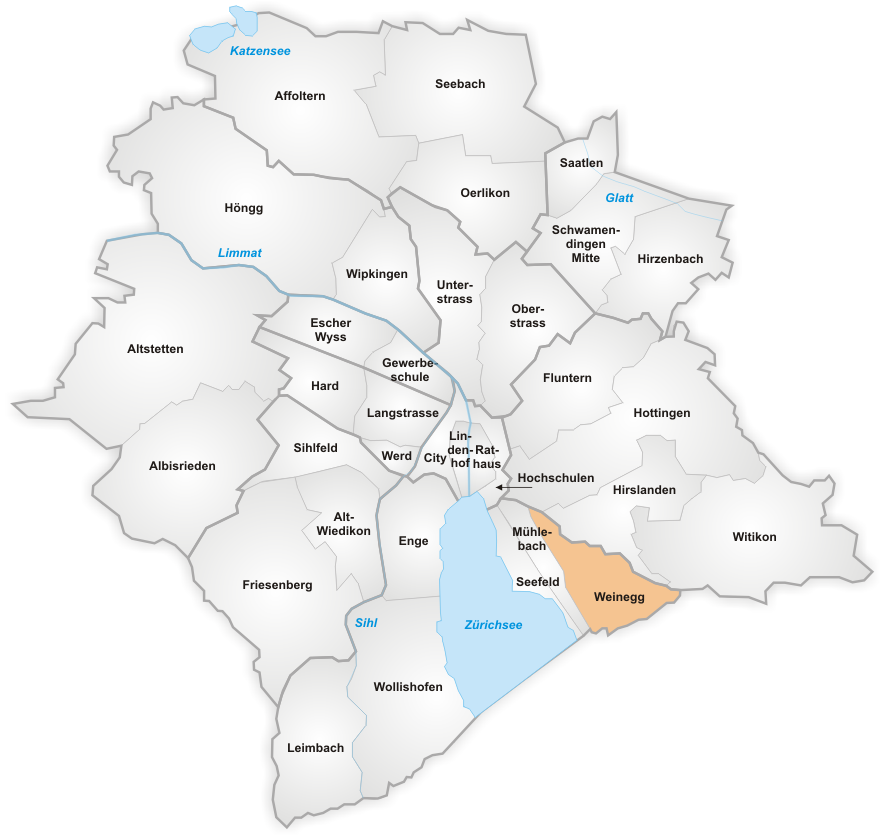
- The quarter of Weinegg in Zürich
- Country: Switzerland
- Canton: Zurich
- Municipality: Zurich
- District: Riesbach

Weinegg is a quarter in District 8 of Zürich.

== Geography and demographics ==
Weinegg was formerly a part of Riesbach municipality, which was incorporated into Zürich in 1893. The quarter has a population of 5,635 distributed on an area of 1.75 km^{2} (0.68 sq mi).

== Enzenbühl and Rehalp cemeteries ==
In 1902 Enzenbühl was, after the old Neumünster and Rehalp cemeteries, the third expansion phase for the growing needs of northeastern Zürich. Arnold Geiser, the city's chief engineer, designed an architecturally simple cemetery with longitudinal and transverse axes, surrounded by high, circular walls. Geiser positioned the abdication chapel, which was built in the Gothic Revival style, at the highest area of the westward sloping plant. In 1934, the cemetery grounds were expanded to their present size.

Friedhof Enzenbühl, a cemetery whose area is shared with the municipality of Zollikon, became the resting place of some popular people, among them Inigo Gallo, César Keiser and Margrit Rainer.

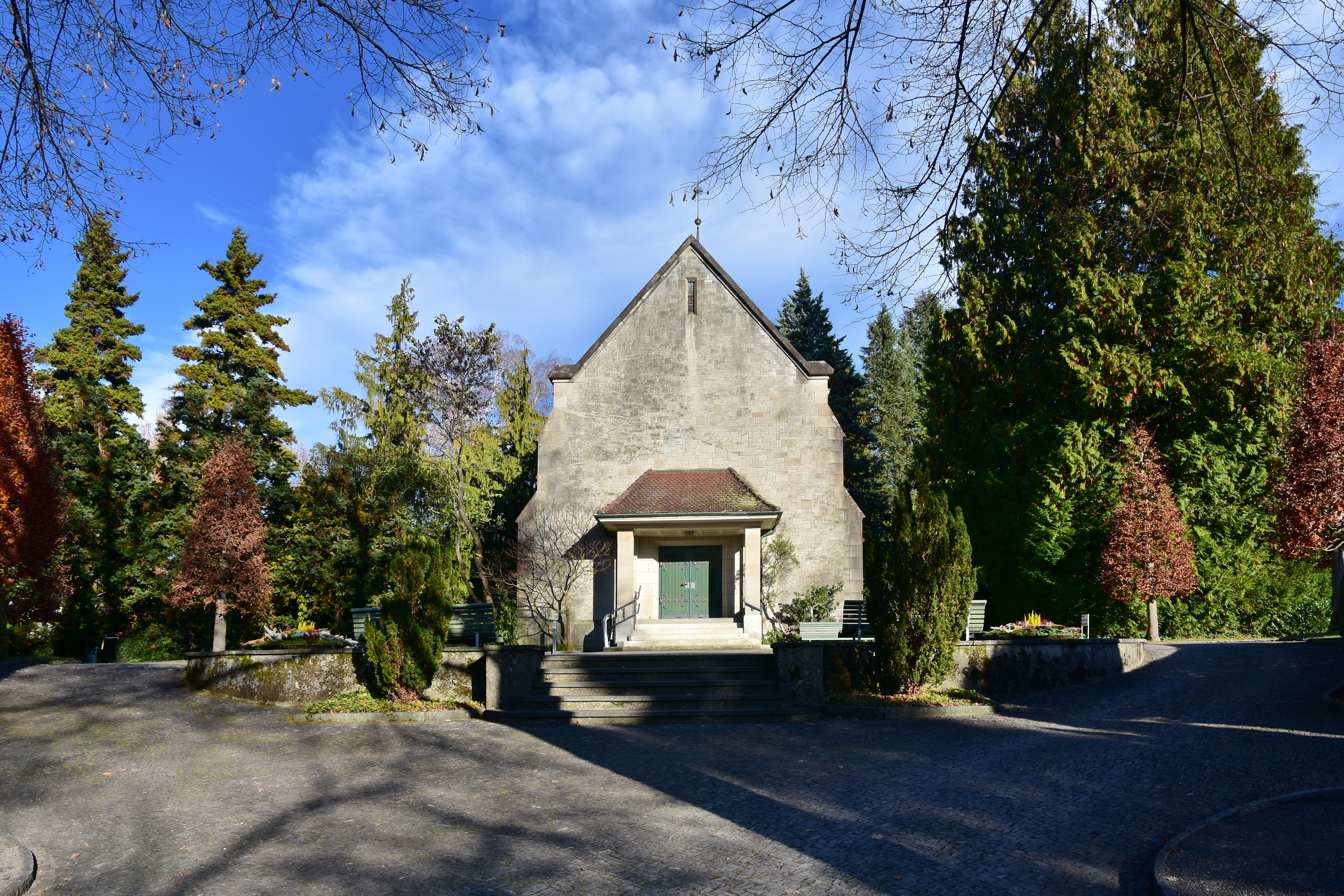
Enzenbühl, cemetery chapel

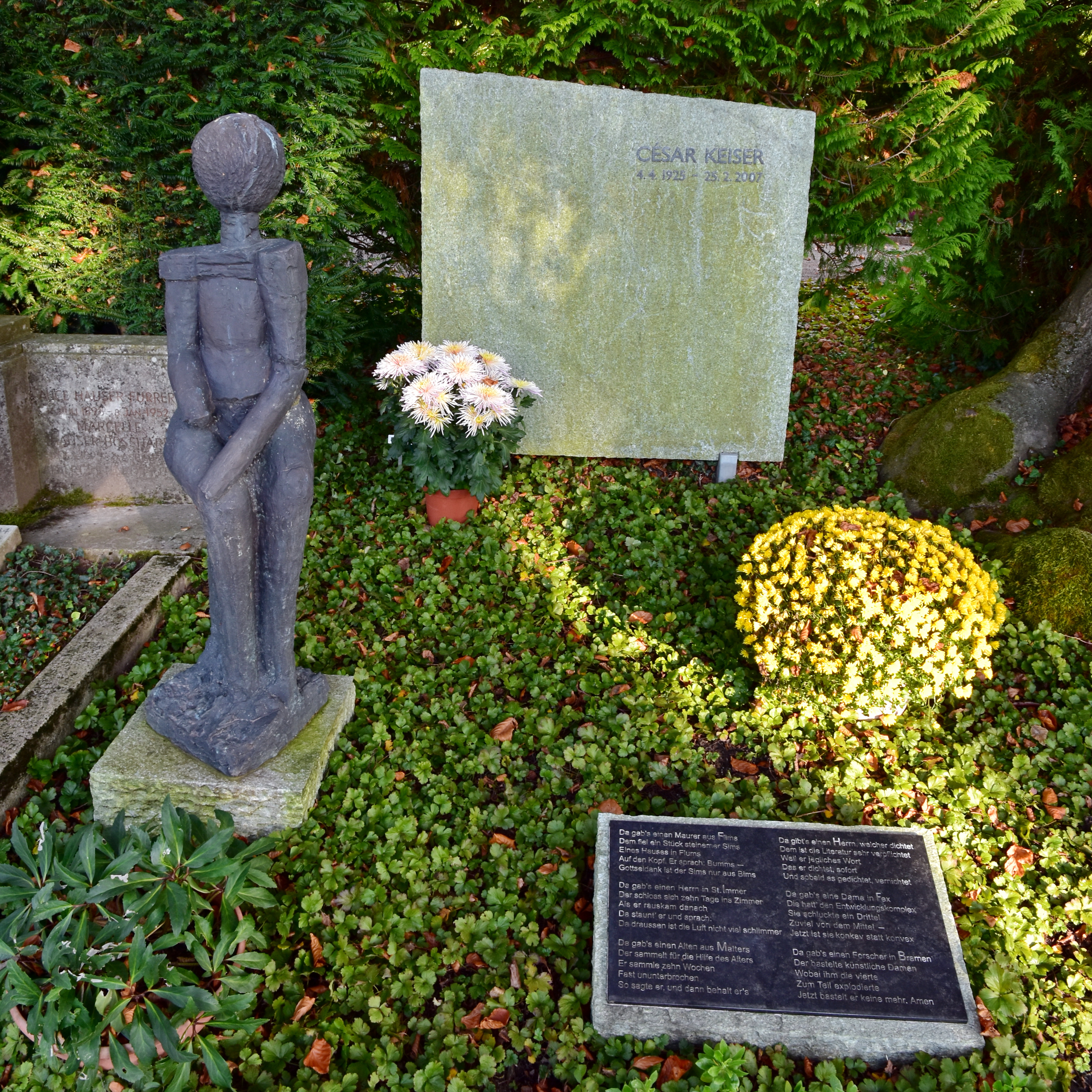
grave of César Keiser

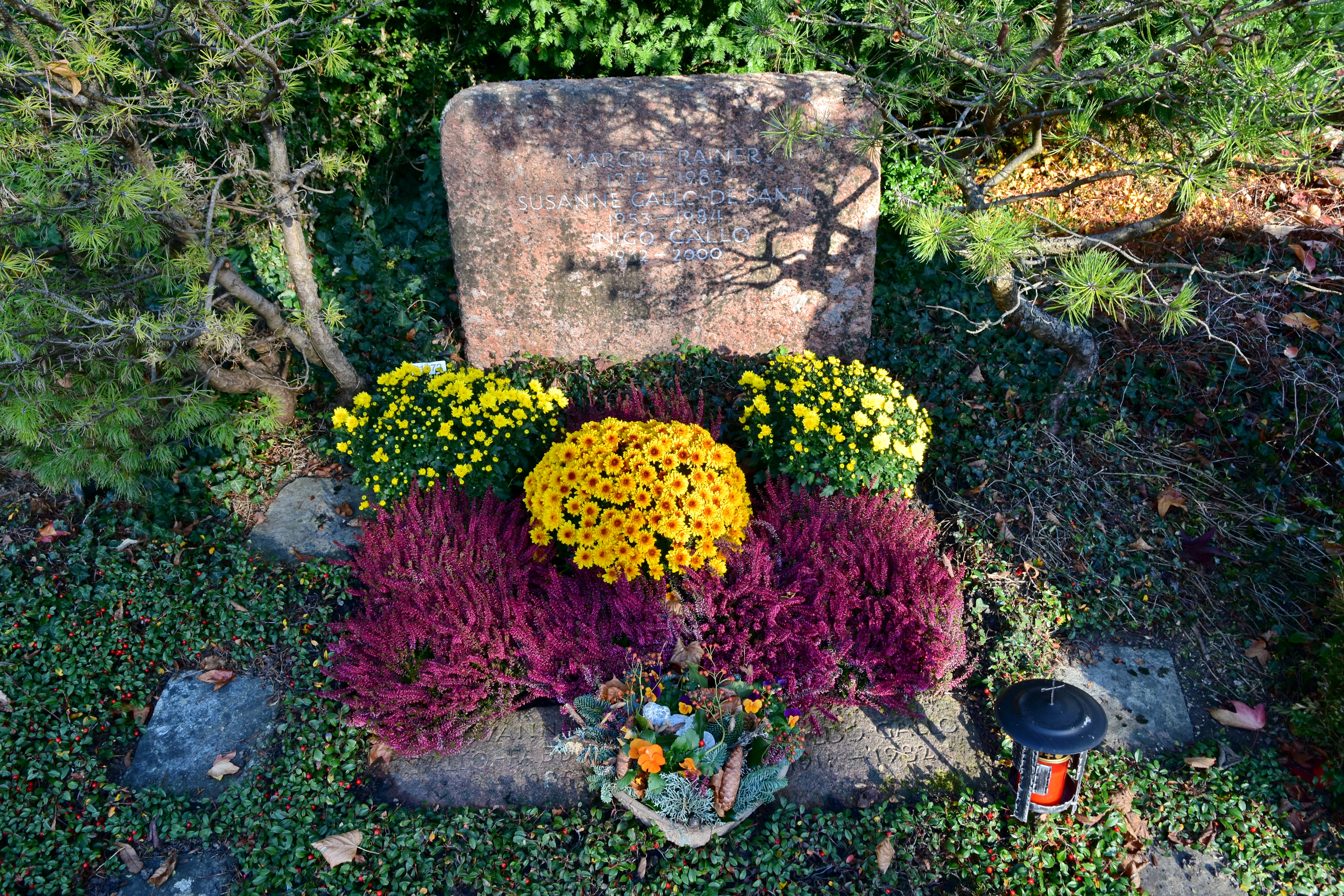
grave of Margrit Rainer, Inigo Gallo and his wife of second marriage

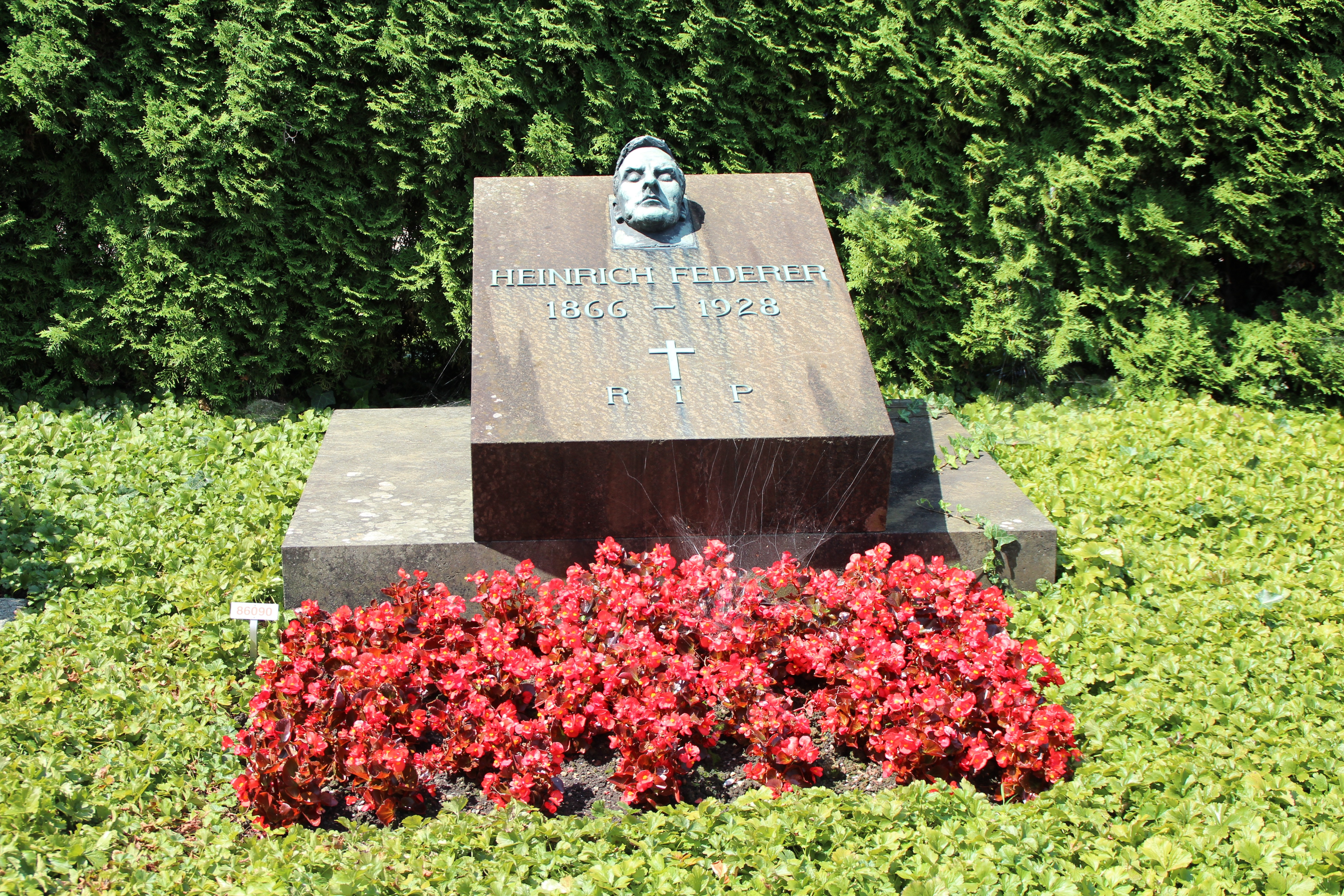
grave of Heinrich Federer

== Culture ==
The fictitious 2007 Swiss mystery film Marmorea was filmed among others, in the Burghölzli sanatory in the Weinegg district, on the Limmat River near Technopark Zürich, at the Limmatquai promenade, and on the Münsterbrücke river crossing towards Münsterhof.

== Gallery ==
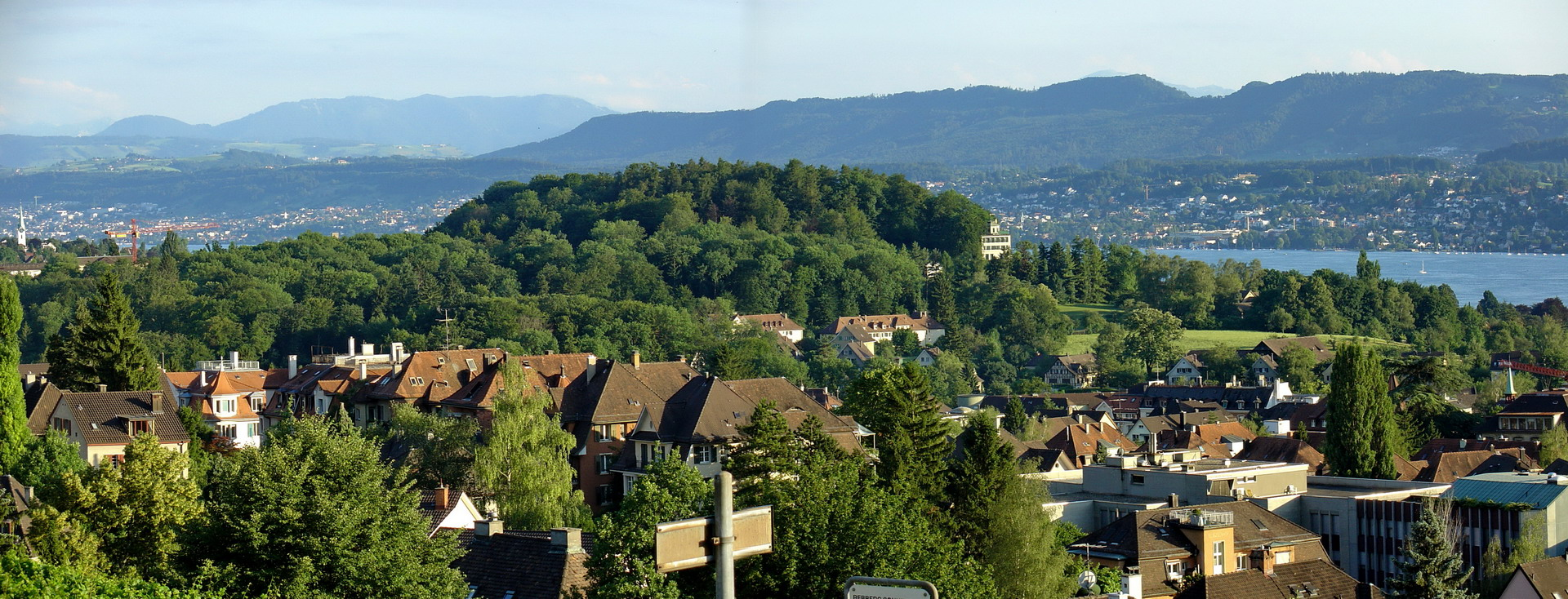
«Burghölzli» hill (in the middle), Lake Zurich and Albis chains in the background

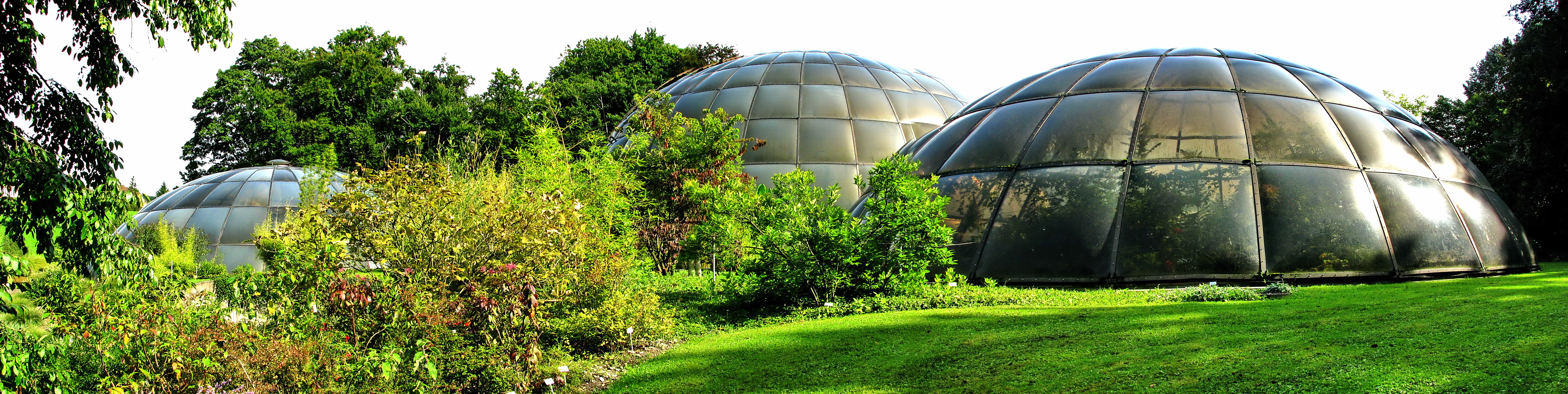
Botanical Garden, Greenhouses, seen from the West

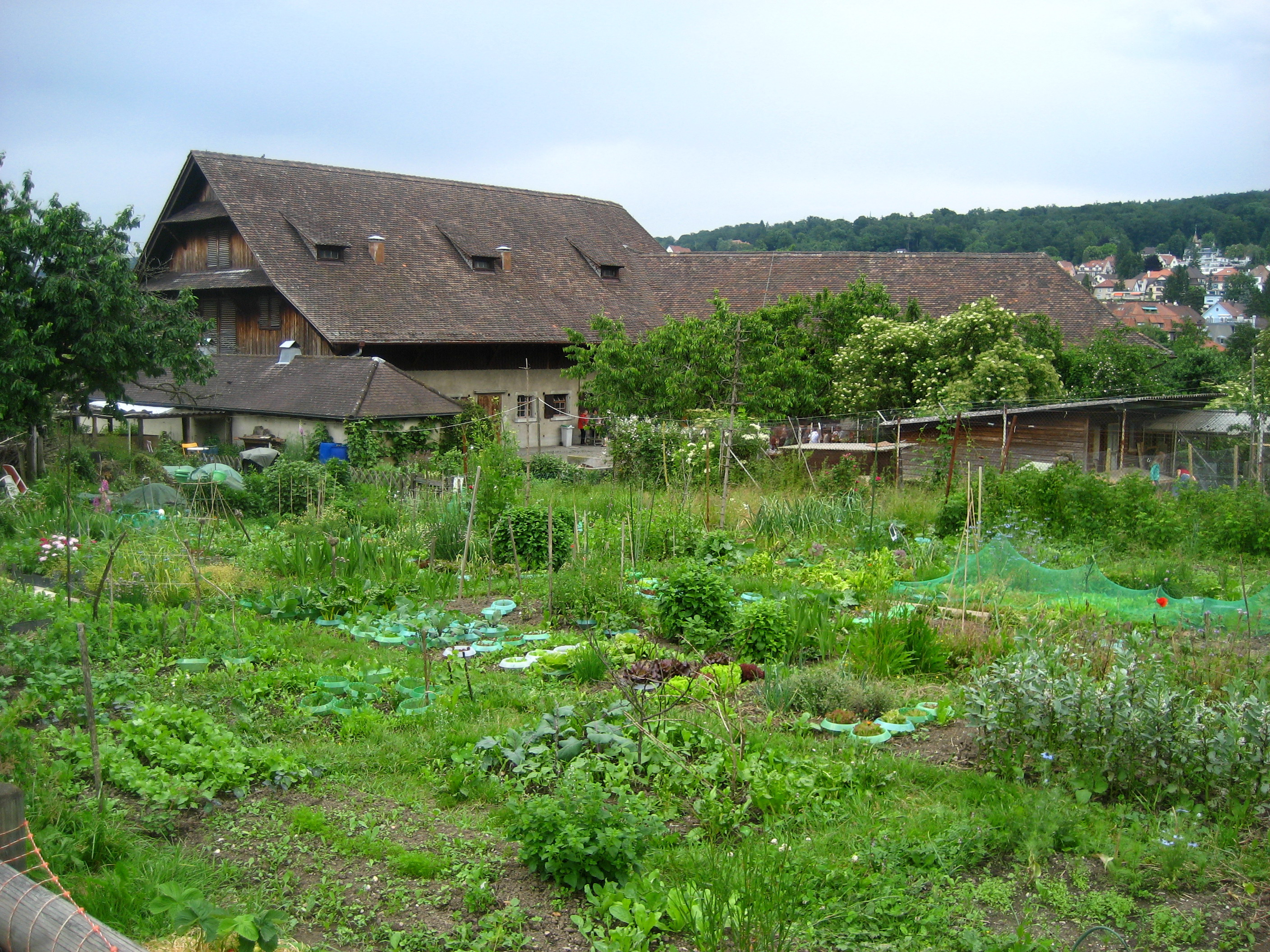
Estate (Quartierhof) Weinegg
