= Mathilde Danegger =

Austrian actress (1903–1988)

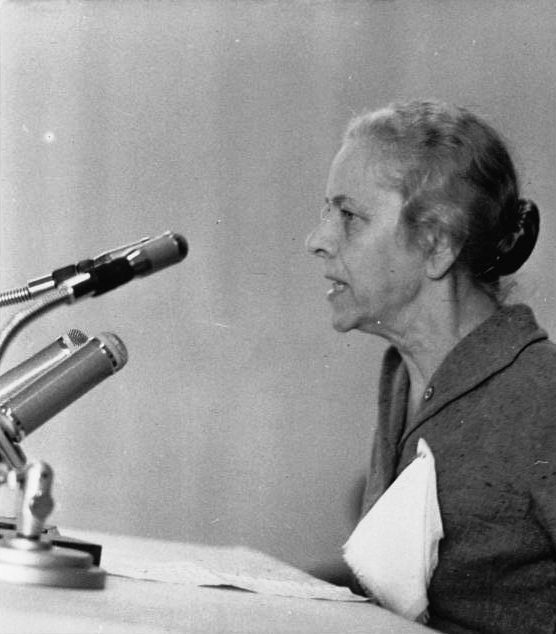
- Mathilde Danegger addressing the 7th Congress of the German Democratic Women's League (Demokratischer Frauenbund Deutschlands), 27 November 1960
- Born: Mathilde Deutsch; 2 August 1903; Vienna, Austria-Hungary
- Died: 27 July 1988 (aged 84); East Berlin, East Germany
- Other name: Mathilde Leusch
- Occupation: actress
- Political party: KPD
- Spouse(s): Herbert Waniek (1897–1949); Walter Lesch (1898–1958); Herbert Crüger (1911–2003)
- Children: Karin Lesch
- Parent: Josef Danegger, Snr (real name Josef Deutsch) (1865–1933)

Mathilde Danegger (née Mathilde Deutsch; 2 August 1903 – 27 July 1988) was an Austrian stage and movie actress. Sources may also identify her by the pseudonym, Mathilde Leusch; Leusch is apparently a variant of her second husband's surname (Lesch).

== Life ==
Mathilde Danegger was born and attended school in Vienna. Her father was an Austrian character actor and stage producer Josef Danegger (real name, Joseph Deutsch: 1865–1933) who later took over as director of the City Theatre in Zürich. Her mother, Bertha Danegger (real name Bertha Deutsch; known professionally by her maiden name Bertha Müller, she was an Austrian actress of stage and silent film.

Like her elder brothers, Josef Danegger (1889–1948) and Theodor Danegger (1891–1959), she decided on a stage career early in life. She started her performing with children's roles, making her debut in 1912 at Max Reinhardt's Deutsches Theater in Berlin, with a further youthful appearance there in 1914.

She would continue to return to the Berlin stage throughout her career, but by 1919 she was, with her parents, based in Zürich. In 1919–1920 she had engagements at the City Theatre in Vienna. From 1921 to 1924, she was working, primarily, at the Popular Theatre in Vienna, and, between 1924 and 1928, at the Theater in der Josefstadt.

Danegger's first marriage was to Herbert Waniek (1897–1949) whose theatre career during the 1920s was focused on the same Vienna theatres as those of his wife. Waniek had connections with the "German Theatre" at Brno (in the former Czechoslovakia), where, until 1933, Mathilde Danegger was making regular guest appearances. There were also frequent guest appearances at theatres in Berlin and Vienna. Around this time she married her second husband, Swiss drama producer Walter Lesch (1898–1958).

With the German change in government at the start of 1933, Mathilde, a staunch antifascist, fled to Switzerland where she worked at the National Theatre in Zürich with Wolfgang Langhoff, like her a political exile from Nazi Germany. She took part in political cabaret, between 1934 and 1938 appearing in the "Cornichon" cabaret established by her husband. In 1939, she met with Herbert Crüger, who subsequently became her third husband. She was a co-founder in Switzerland of the National Committee for a Free Germany.

Two years after the war ended, in 1947, Mathilde Danegger returned to Germany. Sources differ as to whether she settled in the American occupation zone or in East Berlin, which was in the central part of what had been Germany, and was now administered as part of the Soviet occupation zone.

In reality, it was several years before the political division of occupied Germany would be matched by physical barriers. Between 1947 and 1951, she was working at the Hessische National Theatre in Wiesbaden. In East Berlin, supported by the dramatist's wife and business manager, Helene Weigel, Danegger was recruited by Bertolt Brecht to work at the Berliner Ensemble where she was employed between 1951 and 1953. During these years she was active in the peace movement.

In December 1948 she joined the German Communist Party. Between 1948 and 1951 she also wrote, as Cultural Editor, for Unsere Stimme, a regional communist news magazine based at Villingen-Schwenningen near the border with Switzerland.

In 1953, four years after the foundation of two separate German states, and with the border between them becoming less permeable, she formally relocated with her husband to the German Democratic Republic (East Germany). There followed a long period as a star of the Deutsches Theater in Berlin. Among others, she took part in productions by Wolfgang Langhoff, Wolfgang Heinz, Benno Besson and Adolf Dresen.

In parallel with her theatre work, from 1960 she built up an extensive repertoire of cinema and television roles in productions by the state-owned film studio, DEFA, and Deutscher Fernsehfunk, the state television broadcaster. She had already undertaken a significant amount of acting work in front of the camera during her time in Switzerland. Of particular note was her portrayal of Frau Holle in the 1963 film of the eponymous fairy tale by Gottfried Kolditz and her television role in "Mutter Jantschowa" (1968).

She remained politically engaged throughout. In 1957 she wrote a letter to the party defending dissident Wolfgang Harich following his arrest.

== Marriages ==
By her second husband she was the mother of the actress Karin Lesch.

Her third husband, the university lecturer and author Herbert Crüger, became caught up in the political persecution that was a feature of East Germany in the 1950s. In 1956, he was overheard criticising the arrest of Bernhard Steinberger in the aftermath of the remarkable party conference of the Soviet Communist Party.

In March 1958 Crüger was himself arrested by the Ministry for State Security (Stasi). At a secret trial in December 1958 he was found guilty of "high treason" ("schweren Staatsverrats") and sentenced to an eight-year jail term. In the end he was released in 1961 and rehabilitated by the High Court in May 1990.

== Filmography (selection) ==
Cinema films

- 1921: Wege des Schreckens – producer: Mihály Kertész
- 1933: Wie d’Warret würkt – producer: Walter Lesch und Richard Schweizer
- 1935: Ja sooo! – producer: Walter Lesch und Leopold Lindtberg
- 1940: Die missbrauchten Liebesbriefe – producer: Leopold Lindtberg
- 1942: Der Schuss von der Kanzel
- 1944: Marie-Louise – producer: Leopold Lindtberg
- 1947: Madness Rules – producer: Leopold Lindtberg
- 1956: Lissy – producer: Konrad Wolf
- 1959: Ehesache Lorenz – producer: Joachim Kunert
- 1960: Leute mit Flügeln – producer: Konrad Wolf
- 1962: Das verhexte Fischerdorf
- 1962: A Lively Christmas Eve – producer: Günter Reisch
- 1963: Die Glatzkopfbande – producer: Richard Groschopp
- 1963: Frau Holle – producer: Gottfried Kolditz
- 1964: Geliebte weiße Maus – producer: Gottfried Kolditz
- 1964: Der fliegende Holländer – producer: Joachim Herz
- 1965: Solange Leben in mir ist
- 1965: Wenn du groß bist, lieber Adam
- 1968: Abschied
- 1969: Zeit zu leben – producer: Horst Seemann
- 1969: Seine Hoheit – Genosse Prinz – producer: Werner W. Wallroth
- 1987: Wie die Alten sungen… – producer: Günter Reisch

Television films

- 1960: Steine im Weg – producer: Wilhelm Gröhl
- 1967: Kleiner Mann – was nun? – producer: Hans-Joachim Kasprzik
- 1970: Anlauf – producer: Egon Günther
- 1977: Polizeiruf 110: Ein unbequemer Zeuge (TV series)
- 1978: Polizeiruf 110: Die letzte Chance (TV series)
- 1979: Polizeiruf 110: Am Abgrund (TV series) – producer: Hans Werner
- 1980: Archiv des Todes – producer: Rudi Kurz

Documentary films (Narrator)

- 1954–1956: Du und mancher Kamerad – producer: Annelie and Andrew Thorndike
- 1962: Unbändiges Spanien – producer: Kurt and Jeanne Stern

== Theatre (selection) ==
- 1952: Nikolai Pogodin: Das Glockenspiel des Kreml (Sabelins Frau) – producer: Ernst Busch (Berliner Ensemble)
- 1953: Heinar Kipphardt: Shakespeare dringend gesucht (Frau Mellin) – producer: Herwart Grosse (Deutsches Theater Berlin – Kammerspiele)
- 1953: Julius Hays: Der Putenhirt – producer: Fritz Wendel (Deutsches Theater Berlin – Kammerspiele)
- 1953: Friedrich Wolf: Thomas Müntzer, der Mann mit der Regenbogenfahne (Mutter) – producer: Wolfgang Langhoff (Deutsches Theater Berlin)
- 1955: Johann Wolfgang von Goethe: Faust. The Tragedy, Part I – producer: Wolfgang Langhoff (Deutsches Theater Berlin)
- 1955: Johann Nestroy: Theaterg’schichten (Katharina) – producer: Emil Stöhr (Deutsches Theater Berlin)
- 1955: Gerhart Hauptmann: Vor Sonnenuntergang (Mutter Peters) – producer: Wolfgang Heinz (Deutsches Theater Berlin)
- 1956: Hermann Bahr: Das Konzert (Almhütten-Verwalterin) – producer: Robert Meyn (Deutsches Theater Berlin – Kammerspiele)
- 1957: Mary Chase: Mein Freund Harvey (Veta) – producer: Wolfgang Thal (Deutsches Theater Berlin – Kammerspiele)
- 1958: Anton Tschechow: Three sisters – producer: Heinz Hilpert (Deutsches Theater Berlin)
- 1960: Erwin Strittmatter: Die Holländerbraut – producer: Benno Besson (Deutsches Theater Berlin)
- 1961: Pavel Kohout: Die dritte Schwester – producer: Karl Paryla (Deutsches Theater Berlin – Kammerspiele)
- 1962: Nikolai Pogodin: Der Mann mit dem Gewehr (Jelisaweta Nikitischna) – producer: Horst Schönemann (Deutsches Theater Berlin)
- 1962: Peter Hacks (after Aristophanes): Der Frieden (Trygaios Tochter) – producer: Benno Besson (Deutsches Theater Berlin)
- 1963: Sean O'Casey: Rote Rosen für mich (Frau Breydon) – producer: Ernst Kahler (Deutsches Theater Berlin)
- 1964: Molière: Tartuffe (Madame Pernelle) – producer: Benno Besson (Deutsches Theater Berlin – Kammerspiele)
- 1967: Horst Salomon: Ein Lorbaß – producer: Benno Besson (Deutsches Theater Berlin)
- 1968: Hermann Kant: Die Aula – producer: Uta Birnbaum (Deutsches Theater Berlin)
- 1975: Heinrich von Kleist: Der zerbrochne Krug (Brigitte) – producer: Adolf Dresen (Deutsches Theater Berlin)

== Awards and honours ==
- 1955: Clara Zetkin Medal
- 1960: Art Prize of the German Democratic Republic
- 1963: Patriotic Order of Merit in Bronze
- 1969: National Prize of the German Democratic Republic 2nd Class, for arts and literature
- 1978: Patriotic Order of Merit in Gold
- 1983: Patriotic Order of Merit Gold clasp
- 1985: Wolfgang Heinz Ring
- 1988: Star of People's Friendship in Gold
