= Nico Kaufmann =

Swiss musician (1916–1996)

Nico Kaufmann ( 24 June 1916 – 23 November 1996) was a Swiss pianist and composer.

== Life ==
Kaufmann was born in Zürich. Nico Kaufmann's father, Willi Kaufmann-Ernst (1887–1942), was a doctor and composer. His mother's family had become wealthy thanks to the invention of the urinal. In addition to his studies at the Zürich Conservatory, he was for a short time (1937) Vladimir Horowitz's only disciple, during his time living in Europe, after he had met the touring pianist working at the Theater Basel. His playing was awarded first prize at the VII Concours de Geneve (1945). But Kaufmann did not follow the classical career path of a concert pianist and became the Cabaret Cornichon's composer, arranger and musical director, writing the music for their successful programs and touring in Switzerland and beyond.

He died in Zürich.
