= Cäsar von Arx =

Swiss theatre producer and dramatist

- Born: 23 May 1895; Basel, Switzerland
- Died: 14 July 1949; Niedererlinsbach (SO), Switzerland
- Education: Basel
- Occupations: Stage producer Dramatist
- Spouse: Gertrud "Trudi" Häfelin
- Children: 1. Verena, 1925; 2. Maja, 1926
- Parent(s): Alphons von Arx; Elisabeth Emma von Däniken

Cäsar von Arx (23 May 1895 – 14 July 1949) was a Swiss theatre producer and dramatist.

== Life ==
=== Provenance and early years ===
Cäsar von Arx was born into a Catholic family in Basel. At the time of his birth the family was living in the city at Rheingasse 49. Alphons von Arx, his father, who came originally from Stüsslingen (SO), worked as a typesetter. Then as now, children in Switzerland entered primary school at the age of 7, and in 1901 the boy embarked on his school career at the Thomas Platter School, over the bridge from the Basel city centre. While still at school he completed "Laupen", described as "a stage play from Swiss history" in 1913. In 1914 he entered it in the stage-play festival-competition at the Exhibition of Switzerland held at Bern, but without success. The play nevertheless premiered at Basel's recently re-opened City Theatre on 8 June 1914. (Note: The City Theatre burned down in 1904, and it was only after five years that the rebuilt theatre was ready to re-open.) The production, by Ernst Reissig, featured a cast of school children.

=== Basel ===
In 1914 it was at the University of Basel that Cäsar von Arx enrolled, in order to study Germanistics, History and Philosophy. In practice he seems to have been something of a part-time student. During 1915 he completed his short story "Hexensabbath" ("Witches Sabbath") and his drama "Der Heilige und Abigail" ("Abigail and the saint"). The next year he started work on "Die Rot Schwizerin" ("The red Swiss lass"). From 1916 he was also contributing occasional pieces of theatre criticism to the National-Zeitung (as the "Basler Zeitung" newspaper was known at that time). While still enrolled as a student at the university, in 1918 Cäsar von Arx took a job as a stage manager at the City Theatre, where that same year he also undertook his first directorial work. In May 1918 two sixteenth century dramas, the carnival piece "Elsi Tragdenknaben" (loosely, "Elsi carries the little boy"), possibly by Niklaus Manuel and "Die Komödie von den beiden Eheleuten" ("The comedy of the two married people"), thought to be by Tobias Stimmer were staged at the City Theatre by von Arx, who had also undertaken the task of adapting the sixteenth century texts. In December 1919 he staged his adaptations of "Das Spiel vom reichen Mann und armen Lazarus" ("... the rich man and Lazarus"), based on an anonymous original, and "Die Parabel vom verlorenen Sohn" ("The parable of the lost son") by Hans Salat at the City Theatre. He stayed with sixteenth century for "Von fünferlei Betrachtnis" (loosely, "Five things to think about") which he authored in 1919, based on a text by Johann Kolross.

Sources differ of whether it was in 1917 or 1919 that Cäsar von Arx finished with his study at the university, but there is agreement that he left without completing his degree.

=== Leipzig ===
In 1920, moving to Germany, von Arx took a position with the Leipzig Playhouse, where he was based as a producer and playwright till 1923, working under the theatre director Alwin Kronacher. During the 1921/22 season he staged "Vater und Sohn" by Joachim von der Goltz, "Der Abenteurer und die Sängerin" (loosely, "The Adventurer and the Soprano") by Hofmannsthal and Oscar Wilde's "Florentine Tragedy". In 1922/23 he staged Kleist's "Broken Jug" and Goethe's "Siblings". Another high point came on 9 April 1921 when he staged the premier of "Die Rot Schwizerin" ("The red Swiss lass"), the early play on which he had started work in 1915.

On 1 August 1922, while still based at Leipzig, van Arx found time to direct the stage show that celebrated a putative anniversary of founding, more than four centuries earlier, of the shooting club in his home canton of Solothurn. Richard Flury provided the music. A few weeks later, during September 1922, he terminated his contract at the Leipzig Playhouse and returned to Switzerland.

=== Trudi ===
On 22 April 1924 Cäsar von Arx married Gertrud "Trudi" Häfelin, a hotelier's daughter from Engelberg (OW). They made their home in Central Switzerland, in Niedererlinsbach (SO), living at one stage in a house owned by two aunts, from whom in 1932 von Arx subsequently purchased it. The couple's daughters Verena and Maja were born on 27 February 1925 and 19 February 1926.

=== Back in Switzerland ===
The festival stage show that von Arx had produced in Solothurn in August 1922 turned out to be the first in an impressive succession of such shows, which would culminate in August 1941 with a show for inclusion in the 650th anniversary celebrations for the Swiss Federation. On 19 July 1924 he staged and directed a performance for the first post-war Federal Rifle Festival, held at Aarau. Werner Wehrli took care of the music. Also in 1924, he joined the "Schweizerischer Schriftsteller-Verein" (as the Swiss National authors' association was then known) and the "Gesellschaft Schweizerischer Dramatiker" ("Society of Swiss Dramatists"). Between 1924 and 1933 he would serve as a jury member with the latter.

Von Arx worked as director-in-chief at the Zürich Playhouse during the 1924/25 season. He directed productions of a number of classics including Shaw's Pygmalion, Wedekind's "Die junge Welt" (originally published under the title "Kinder und Narren": loosely, "Children and knaves"), Hedda Gabler, "Dornröschen" ("Sleeping Beauty") by Ricarda Huch, "Der Gedanke" ("The Thought") by Leonid Andreyev, Pirandello's "Wollust der Ehrlichkeit" ("The Joys of Honesty") and Tolstoy's "Er ist an allem schuld" ("It's all his fault"). The next year he embarked on a festival-related project planned by the local authorities at Interlaken for the surrounding Bernese Oberland region, but this project came to nothing. The work he had prepared for it was staged only much later, on 4 November 1939 at Bern's City Theatre as a special production of the Bernese Theatre Association. During 1926 he completed "Burleske vom Tod" ("Burlesque on Death"), a stage work on which he had started work almost ten years earlier. Over the next couple of years he completed his next stage work, "Moritat" (loosely "Murder ballad"). These two morbidly titled stage pieces were premiered only posthumously, however. Both received their first performances in 1995 from university drama groups, the first at Sarnen and the second at Zürich.

On 9 July 1927 von Arx staged his celebration piece "Die Brücke" at the cantonal Rifle Festival at Brugg. Between Autumn/Fall 1926 and Summer 1929 von Arx was living with his friend, Wilhelm Geiger, at the Paradiso quarter of Lugano in Ticino: for the 1928 production of "Die Brücke" he was joined by Eugen Aberer as co-director. The show put on for biennial Federal Gymnastics Festival which opened in Luzern on 19 July 1928, was a larger event, featuring 1,200 performers. Cäsar von Arx was one of three co-directors, along with Eugen Aberer and Gottfried Falkenhausen. As before, music was provided by Werner Wehrli. There are indications that during the later 1920s von Arx and his family lived a somewhat itinerant lifestyle, then they in May 1929 returned to Niedererlinsbach (SO) and lived out their lives.

=== Successes as a playwright ===
The premiere of his drama, "Die Geschichte vom General Johann August Suter" ("The story of General Johann August Suter") was staged on 18 January 1930 at the Zürich Playhouse, directed by Herbert Waniek. Later that year the play won the triennial Bernese Drama prize from the "Stiftung für das Drama" ("Drama Foundation" - subsequently renamed as the "Welti-Stiftung"). That was followed by "Opernball 13" ("Opera Ball ....") which had its premiere at the same theatre on 12 March 1931, also at Zürich. This time the performance was directed by the young German director, Eugen Schulz-Breiden. His next play at the Playhouse was the dialect comedy "Vogel friss oder stirb!" (loosely, "Eat the bird or die"), directed by August Schmid, which opened on 20 October 1931. Between 1931 and 1933 he was also engaged in the politics of the theatre, serving as a board member of the "Gesellschaft Schweizerischer Dramatiker" ("Society of Swiss Dramatists").

On 27 May 1932 Swiss Radio (Studio Bern) transmitted his first radio play, which he had completed earlier that same year. It carried the less than snappy title "1882–1932. Hörspiel zum Jubiläum der Gotthardbahn" ("1882-1932: Radio Play for the [50 year] jubilee of the Gotthardbahn"). Later in 1932 came evidence that von Arx was building his reputation as a dramatist beyond Switzerland's borders, with a performance on 5 December of "Die Geschichte vom General Johann August Suter" ("The story of General Johann August Suter") at the Theater am Schiffbauerdamm in Berlin. In terms of his public profile 1933, the year in which the Hitler government took power in Germany, was a quieter year for van Arx in Switzerland. It was, however, the year in which, on 6 May, his father Alphons died.

The play "Verrat von Novara" (loosely, "Treason at Novara" - based around the Swiss fact-based legend of the same name) had its premiere on 6 January 1934 at the Zürich Playhouse under the direction of Leopold Lindtberg. It is generally seen as the most artistically and commercially successful of the plays by Cäsar von Arx, both domestically and abroad, above all in Germany. In 1935 "Verrat von Novara" won for its creator a special prize ("Ehrenpreis") from the Swiss Schiller Foundation in Zürich. In 1936 it also won the Bernese Drama prize from the "Stiftung für das Drama". Cäsar von Arx had already won this prize, which had been inaugurated in 1924, and continued to be awarded every three years till 2003: he appears to have been the only dramatist to have won it more than once.

=== Darkening political context ===
5 March 1936 saw the world premiere of "Der heilige Held" ("The Holy Hero") at the Zürich Playhouse. It featured an episode from the 1478 Entlebucher insurrection against the community's its domination by Luzern. The director was again Leopold Lindtberg. During much of 1936 van Arx was working on his next play, "Dreikampf", which could be seen as an imprudently political drama. Germany had been transformed by its leaders into a post-democratic one-party state during 1933, and Austria had rapidly followed suit. Italy had been ruled by a fascist government without a break since 1922 (and without a multi-party election since 1924). In Switzerland democracy would, in most respects, survive through the 1930s and 1940s, but the country's politics, society and institutions would not remain untouched by the nationalist populism contaminating other countries in western Europe. Cäsar von Arx was a passionate anti-fascist, and during 1936 he withdrew from the Berlin-based "Verband Deutscher Bühnenschriftsteller und Bühnenkomponisten" which, like other professional associations in Germany, was succumbing to intensifying government pressure to subordinate its purposes to those of the National Socialist Party. With the benefit of hindsight it becomes apparent that by this stage the career as a dramatist of Cäsar von Arx had peaked.

During 1937 van Arx began work on layouts for that year's Selzach Passion Play, for which Arthur Honegger had been commissioned to write the music. The project would never be completed, though some of the music for it would be recycled in Honegger's 1953 "Cantate de Noel".

The period piece "Dreikampf" had its premiere at the City Theatre Basel on 2 February 1938. Werner Wolff directed the production. The play was a none too carefully coded exposition of the dangers posed by Totalitarianism: it triggered artistic and political controversy across Switzerland. Later that year von Arx authored "Laupen, Festspiel zur 600jährigen Jubelfeier in Bern", a piece designed to complement a six hundredth jubilee celebrations for the City of Bern.

=== Georg Kaiser ===
In August 1938 Gertrud and Cäsar von Arx invited the German dramatist and (since 1933) resistance activist Georg Kaiser to Engelberg, the remote municipality where Gertrud von Arx had grown up, and (through all but the worst of the winter), easily accessible from the von Arx home at Niedererlinsbach. (Note: Kaiser had left his own home in some haste, narrowly avoiding a search of his home by the security services of which, it seems likely, he had been forewarned. Between 1938 and 1945, with his partner and daughter, he led a restless but artistically creative life in Switzerland, changing homes frequently: for the most part his artistic creativity was ignored by the Swiss arts establishment.) Von Arx and Kaiser became good friends, frequently skiing together in the mountains around Engelberg between 1938 and 1941, while Kaiser lived with his family in the magnificent "Park Hotel" owned by the parents of Gertrud von Arx. Sources are silent as to who paid the bills. Von Arx helped his friend with time consuming repeated applications to the Swiss authorities for residence permits. (Note: The Swiss authorities were keen to avoid upsetting the governments of neighbouring countries and, especially before the outbreak of a European war in September 1939, treated the many political and/or Jewish refugees arriving from Germany to a strategy of calculated bureaucratic procrastination.) At least one commentator suggests that the time and energy devoted by Cäsar von Arx to trying to help his friend settle with his family in Switzerland, and tangle with the bureaucrats handling residence permits, severely detracted from his own literary work at what might, under other circumstances, have been a particularly productive chapter in his career as a dramatist.

In late summer 1938 von Arx teamed up with Georg Kaiser and another exile from Hitler's Germany, Carl Zuckmayer, to launch a new play (by von Arx), "Der kleine Sündenfall" (loosely, "The lesser Fall of Man") at the Zürich Playhouse, directed by Leonard Steckel. The "introductory matinee" first performance took place on 25 September and the evening premiere on 29 September 1938.

During 1938-39 van Arx sat as a member of the jury for the Berne Drama Foundation prize for 1939. Encouraged by his friend Georg Kaiser, he also produced a German language filmscript, subsequently forgotten, "Die letzte Geliebte".

=== Surrounded by war ===
In September 1939 German and Soviet troops invaded Poland. The German invasion came a couple of weeks before the Soviet one, and the French government reacted by declaring war (for which the country was not militarily well prepared). Eight months after that Germany invaded France. The Italian government joined the war in June 1940, leaving Switzerland surrounded by nations at war. The resulting political and economic pressures were relentless and intense. During the tense pre-war uncertainties, between 9 and 12 May 1939, Jean Goudal's francophone adaptation of his anti-fascist drama "Dreikampf" was performed at the Comédie de Genève (theatre), renamed in this version with the thought-provoking title "Moloch". On 4 November 1939 Cäsar von Arx had another stage premiere with a show for the latest "Berner Oberland Spiel". The music came from Paul Burkhard, still at the early stages of his career as a composer.

By 1941 he was becoming more productive. "Romanze in Plüsch" (loosely, "Romanza in velvet") had its premiere at the Zürich Playhouse, directed by Leopold Lindtberg on 1 March 1941. That was followed at the start of August by his elaborate and well-received stage show celebrating the 650th anniversary of the Swiss Federation. The show was directed by Oskar Eberle while Johann Baptist Hilber, a composer better known for his contributions to church music, took charge of the musical aspects.

After the 650th anniversary celebrations in 1941, the stage works of van Arx began to fall out of favour with mainstream audiences, while he himself increasingly retreated into private life, preoccupied with the danger that Switzerland was sliding into a subservient relationship with its National Socialist superpower which, before 1942, was widely expected to win the war and dominate the continent. During 1942 he became ill with serious pulmonary inflammation from which, however, he recovered.

During 1943/44 van Arx served as a member of the radio play jury with Radio Studio Bern (with which his links with the radio station went back to the early 1930s). His stage play "Land ohne Himmel" (loosely, "Earth without Heaven"), featuring the lengthy "Swiss" liberation struggle in the context of a significant confrontation between the empire and the papacy in and around 1240, had its premiere, directed by Leopold Lindtberg at the Zürich Playhouse, 12 February 1944.

=== Later years ===
Georg Kaiser, still aged only 66, died on 4 June 1945. The loss was a significant blow. The men had remained close friends, and von Arx had been appointed Kaiser's executor. Between 1946 and 1947 he served as a dramaturgical advisor to the "Schweizerischer Schriftsteller-Verein" and the "Schweizerischer Bühnenverband". He was also a member, between 1946 and 1948, of the Audit and Control Commission of the Zürich Stage Studio ("... Bühnenstudio ...").

A final significant premiere came on 12 February 1947, with a production by Leonard Steckel of the three-act "Zwingli-drama" "Brüder in Christo" at the Zürich Playhouse.

=== Death ===
On 14 July 1949, accompanied by his younger daughter, Maja, Cäsar von Arx made his final visit to the Cantonal Hospital at Aarau. That morning his wife died at the end of a lengthy and painful illness. The widower had never made any secret of the fact that, without the support of his wife Trudi, he would not be able to continue living and working. By the time of Trudi's death he was prepared. He had, in particular, taken time to study medical text books in order to know how a bullet might be shot into the skull without causing damage to the face. (His large study, in which he had written his dramas since 1929, was decorated on one side, with a little collection of death masks representing famous literary figures from the past.) He had also acquired a pistol from the "Waffen-Pauli" gun shop in Aarau. Since he had never held a gun permit, it seems reasonable to speculate, as sources do, that he had misled the sales assistant into thinking that he intended to bring it straight back. On returning from the hospital he made his final preparations, carefully shaving so that a perfect death mask might be prepared from his dead face. He then sent his daughter Maja to visit the local school teacher, Viktor Kamber, with a request that she should return to his study with Kamber at 15.00. When Kamber arrived, he found the body von Arx sitting back in the large red leather chair in his study, smiling peacefully. The study in which von Arx took his own life has been preserved, and is little changed in more than seventy years. That is due both to the dramatist's enduring reputation and to the activities of the Cäsar von Arx Foundation, set up in 1988 by Maja von Arx, his younger daughter.

== Burial ==
=== 1949 ===
"Hundreds and hundreds of mourners and too many children to count, clutching their funerary wreaths" followed the two coffins in the procession to the Catholic church at Niedererlinsbach on 16 July 1949, according to the report of the event that appeared later in a Basel newspaper. The townsfolk all came, along with large numbers of outsiders, including well-known artists, colleague. poets, actors and a large delegation from Solothurn. The burial was preceded by a short but intense controversy of whether it should be permitted for the body of Cäsar van Arx to be buried in ground surrounding the church, given that he had (very publicly) taken his own life. The local priest nevertheless enforced his conviction that the couple deserved a church burial, in the face of strong reservations on the part of the bishop. The bodies were buried to the right side of the church, opposite the entrance on the south side of it. The burials would normally have been followed by a few informal graveside tributes to the deceased from family members and friends, but proceeding were instead interrupted by a sudden thunder storm, so there was a dash for the church. Inside, informal tributes were delivered not just by family and friends, but also by the respected politician Urs Dietschi.

=== 1975 ===
The couple's bodies hit the headlines twenty-five years later. The local council, following the usual custom, agreed to remove the bodies after twenty-five years. One councillor, Ruth Grossenbacher, objected. But she was very young. As a councillor she also stood out from the crowd on account of her gender. Women's suffrage was only introduced in the Canton of Solothurn in 1971. Grossenbacher's objections to the removal of the bodies of Cäsar von Arx were over-ruled by the majority. The majority against her on the local was small, however, and she now turned for support to the Cantonal legislature which agreed with her objections and, significantly, agreed to bear the costs of exhuming the bodies. Back in Niedererlinsbach the local council now reconsidered the matter. They did so on 23 May 1975, which would have been the dramatist's eightieth birthday, had he still been alive. It was too late to prevent the removal of the bodies, but it was not too late to return them to the graveyard surrounding the church. The exhumation was attended by the local doctor and a number of other leading citizens. The doctor was able to identify immediately the physical remains of Cäsar von Arx, thanks to the positioning of the bullet hole in the skull. The bodies were returned to the graveyard surrounding the church, where they remain, now at the edge of the site. Above the repositioned grave is the brief inscription originally chosen by the writer. (Note: "Nulla crux, nulla corona" ("No cross, no crown").)
