= César Keiser =

Swiss actor (1925–2007)

- César Keiser
- Born: 4 April 1925; Basel, Canton of Basel-Stadt, Switzerland
- Died: 25 February 2007 (aged 81); Zürich, Canton of Zürich, Switzerland
- Other names: Cés Keiser; Hanspeter Keiser; Keiser, Cäsar
- Occupations: Cabarettist, comedian, radio personality, stage, television and film actor
- Years active: 1946–2007
- Spouse: Margrit Läubli (m. 1956)
- Children: 2
- Website: Official website (in German)

César Keiser or Hanspeter Keiser (4 April 1925 – 25 February 2007) was a Swiss cabarettist, comedian, radio personality, and stage and film actor, usually starring in Swiss German language cinema, television and stage productions.

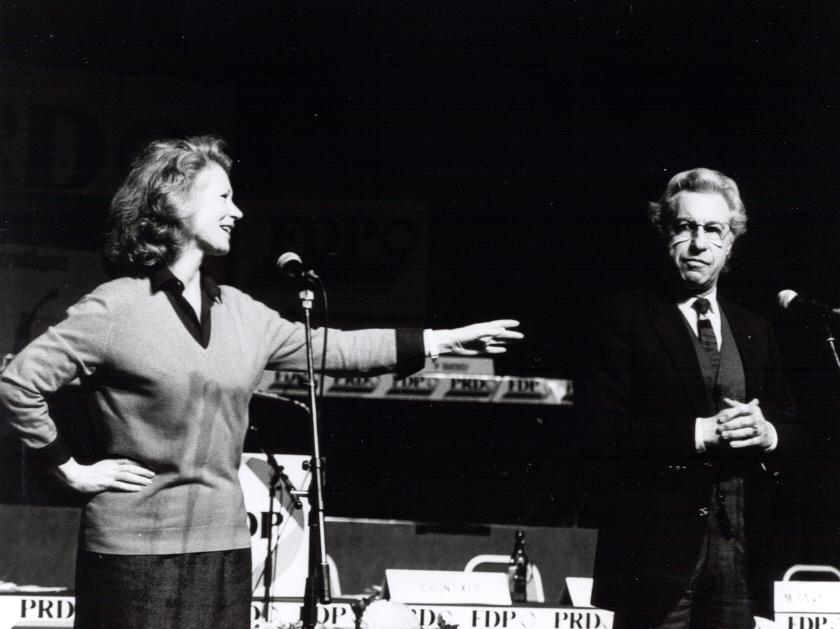
Margrit Läubli and César Keiser (1986)

== Life and work ==
Keiser was born in Basel, Switzerland, and attended gymnasium (a type of secondary school) there. He attended a teacher training college and the Basel School of Applied Arts to become a drawing teacher from 1946–1950. He was a teacher at the Basel School of Applied Arts from 1950 to 1951.

During World War II, Keiser was a drummer in various entertainment and jazz groups, among others, together with Lukas Cheese Burckhardt in his own orchestra César Roy. In 1944, Keiser founded the amateur theater group "Quodlibet Basel", a circle of literary and culturally interested people. In 1946 Keiser was co-founder of "Cabaret Kikeriki" in which he participated as a writer and performer until its dissolution in 1951. Then he was hired as an actor and writer for Cabaret Fédéral in Zürich, for which he had previously written several sketches and stayed until 1958. Here he met his future wife and duo partner, Margrit Läubli, whom he married in 1956. The couple had two sons, Mathis (born 1958) and Lorenz Keiser (born 1959).

During ten months he was a travel correspondent in the Middle East in 1955/56. Starting 1958 Keiser for three years worked as director and scriptwriter for commercials at the "CEFI" movie company in Zürich.

On 18 April 1962 his satirical program "César Keiser: Solo Programm" on Theater am Hechtplatz at Limmatquai Zürich premiered, co-directed with Margrit Läubli. Exactly one year later, the second solo program "César Keiser: Opus 2" debuted on Hechtplatz stage, and from "Opus 3" (1964) Keiser and Läubli acted as a duo. Approximately every two years a new "Opus" program premiered until "Opus 13" (1989). In between, in 1972 "Opus Festival", a cross-section-anniversary program "Cabaret? Cabaret!" with historical texts related to the history of the Swiss cabaret was staged in 1975, and in 1980 "Opus USA" followed by a US tour was among Keiser's further works. This was followed by "Opus 2000: Achtung Schnappschüsse!" in 1992, "Frisch geliftet!" in 1996, and in 2002 by the recapitulation program "Opus Feuerwerk". Almost all programs premiered at the Theater am Hechtplatz, then Keiser and Läubli went on tour in Switzerland, and partly they gave guest performances in Germany and in the United States, in Washington and New York. The programs were recorded on tape and on television. Keiser wrote the texts, in the first two programs supported by Fridolin Tschudi and later by his son Lorenz Keiser. Among the longtime musical staff were René Gerber, Hans Moeckel, Werner Kruse, Bruno Spoerri, and later his other son Mathis Keiser.

In addition to these duo programs, in 1976 Keiser and Läubli directed the exhibition "1916–1976: 60 Jahre Theater in der Schweiz" in the Helmhaus gallery-museum in Zürich. As commissioned works Keiser wrote the musical "Robinson" which premiered on 29 December 1979 at the Stadttheater St. Gallen. In the musical "Lueg uf zrugg Züri", he staged together with Läubli, alongside Elizabeth Quick, Noëmie Nadelmann, Ueli Beck, Ernst Stiefel and over eighty laymen actresses and actors, at the "Stadthof 11" theater in Zürich-Oerlikon. In 1995 Keiser and Läubli produced the Swiss German musical comedy "Wer zuletzt stirbt...", starring Keiser and among others Heinz Bühlmann and Mathis Keiser. Besides, Keiser permanently provided works for the Swiss radio, and in 1998 a jointly drafted duo program with Mathis Keiser: "The Lady Is a Tramp!", and a tribute to Frank Sinatra, again on the Hechtplatz stage. Keiser also published some cabaret-related books.

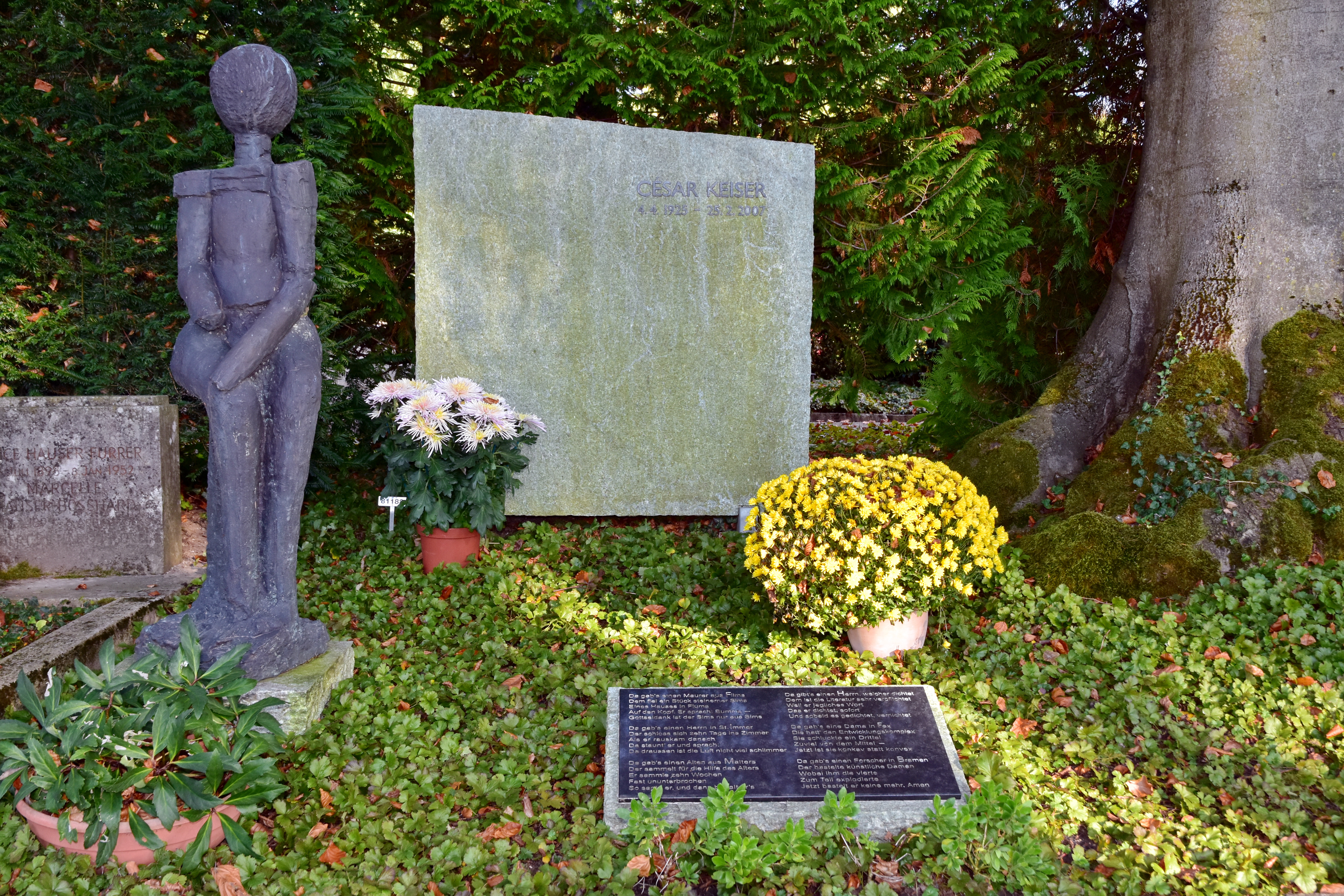
Grave of César Keiser, Enzenbühl cemetery, Zürich-Weinegg

César Keiser was buried at the Enzenbühl cemetery in Zürich-Weinegg.

== Awards ==
Some of Keiser's awards include:

- 1982: Literaturkommissionen der Zürcher Kantonsregierung und der Stadt Zürich.
- 1984: Auszeichnung für kulturelle Verdienste by the city of Zürich.
- 1990: Cornichon-Preis by Oltner Cabaret-Tage.
- 1999: Salzburger Ehrenstier.
- 2003: Goldplakette by Zuger Annemarie und Eugen Hotz-Stiftung,
- 2004: Ehren Prix Walo for his lifetime work.

== Select filmography ==
- 1954: Grüezi, Herr Nachbar!
- 1956: Polizischt Wäckerli
- 1959: Hinter den sieben Gleisen
- 1961: Chikita
- 1962: Spaß mit Ernst (Stankovski) (Television film)
- 1982: Herr Herr (Television film)
- 1982: Der Besuch der alten Dame (Television film)
- 2001–2003: Lüthi und Blanc (Television series, 54 episodes)
- 2005: Anjas Engel (Television film)
- 2005: Mein Name ist Eugen (Rascals on the Road, international English title)

== Writings ==
- César Keiser and Margrit Läubli: Das Grosse César Keiser Cabaret Buch. Huber Frauenfeld 2005, ISBN 3-7193-1400-6.
