= Herbert Waniek =

- Born: 17 October 1897; Vienna, Austro-Hungary
- Died: 11 May 1949; Vienna, Austria
- Occupation(s): stage actor theatrical producer and impresario opera director
- Spouse(s): 1. Mathilde Danegger (1903-1988); 2. Ilse Josefine Kipper (1928-1981)
- Parent: Rudolf Waniek

Herbert Waniek (17 October 1897 – 11 May 1949) was a Vienna stage actor, theatrical producer and impresario. After 1943, he also began to build a parallel reputation as an opera director.

As a young man, he dabbled in journalism, as a commentator on developments in drama.

== Life ==
Herbert Waniek was born in Vienna. His father, Rudolf Waniek, was in business as a household goods supplier: Rudolf Waniek held an "Imperial Warrant" as a supplier to The Court. The son undertook his military service in the context of the First World War; first at Innsbruck, then on the Italian front, before being transferred to a desk job at the Ministry for War in Vienna. By 1917, he was contributing to the expressionist journal "Ver!", and in 1918, he started to receive acting lessons from Ernst Arndt, a leading member of Vienna's Court Theatre ("Burgtheater") theatre company. Waniek made his stage debut at the Linz regional theatre in 1919, and in 1920, was engaged at the Neuen Wiener Bühne (theare).

In 1921, he switched to the Deutsches Theater (as it was then known) in Brünn, which is where he undertook his first work as a producer. Between 1922 and 1924, he worked as a member of the Popular Theatre ("Volkstheater") company in Vienna, moving to the city's Theater in der Josefstadt in 1924. Here he played under Max Reinhardt, and produced a series of matinee (afternoon) productions of modern dramatic works. He was one of the founders of the "Theatre of the New in the Josefstadt Theatre", with presentations including his 1926 production of Bertolt Brecht's "Lebenslauf des Mannes Baal" ("Career of the Man, Baal").

Between 1927 and 1930, Waniek was an actor-producer under Ferdinand Rieser at the Zürich Playhouse, where from 1928, he was also Senior Director of Acting ("Oberspielleiter"). During this time, the parts he took included the title role in Kleist's "Amphitryon" and that of Ferdinand in Schiller's "Kabale und Liebe" ("Intrigue and Love"). He also staged his own theatrical adaptations of "Karl und Anna" by Leonhard Frank and Everyman by Hugo von Hofmannsthal, and produced the stage premier of "Die Geschichte vom General Johann August Suter" ("The History of General Johann August Suter") by Cäsar von Arx.

Along with highly stylized presentation of classics such as Shakespeare's Hamlet and Goethe's Faust, Waniek also used stage-sets involving organ pipes, palisades and plain steel tubes, for "Avant-garde" productions, such as Ferdinand Bruckner's Die Verbrecher (The Crook), based on Erwin Piscator's stage sets. He frequently employed technical devices such as multiple simultaneous and rotating stages, loud speakers, filmed material and projected images.

In 1930, he was head-hunted for a job at the Städtische Bühnen (as the theatre was then known) in Essen. However, by 1931, he had returned to the Zürich Playhouse where he remained till 1933. His further productions here included Richard Duschinsky's "Theater", Molnárs "Die Fee", Christa Winsloe's "Gestern und heute", John Galsworthy's "The Fugitive", the premier of Walter Lesch's "Die tödliche Ordnung" ("The deathly ordinance") and Erich Ebermayer's "Professor Unrat" based on the novel by Heinrich Mann.

In 1933, Herbert Waniek returned to Vienna, taking over as director at the Court Theatre ("Burgtheater"). He held the position until his death in 1949, during which he was responsible for more than 60 drama productions, sustaining the theatre's reputation as a focus for Viennese popular dramas. His productions during this period included Raimunds "Der Verschwender", Nestroy's "Der Talisman", Tirso de Molinas "Don Gil of the Green Breeches", Molière's "Imaginary Invalid" and Csokor's "Kalypso" along with Shakespeare's "As you like it" and Midsummer Night's Dream. A new departure came in 1943 with the staging of Mozart's Die Entführung aus dem Serail, to which he returned in 1948 for that year's Salzburg festival, teaming up with the conductor Heinrich Krips. The production was later taken on tour to Rome, Florence and Paris. There were also light opera productions including, in October 1948, one at the Popular Opera House ("Wiener Volksoper") of Otto Nicolai's "Merry Wives of Windsor" in which the orchestra was placed on the stage and the drama took place in the heart of the auditorium, surrounded by the audience, in a manner which greatly mimicked the lay-out of an English Elizabethan theatre and, according to one critic, greatly enhanced the clarity of the music, especially of the orchestral parts, for the audience.

At the time of his unexpected death in Vienna on 11 May 1949, Waniek was planning a production of Richard Strauss's Silent Woman ("Die schweigsame Frau").
