= Margrit Läubli =

Swiss actress, comedian, dancer and radio personality (born 1928)

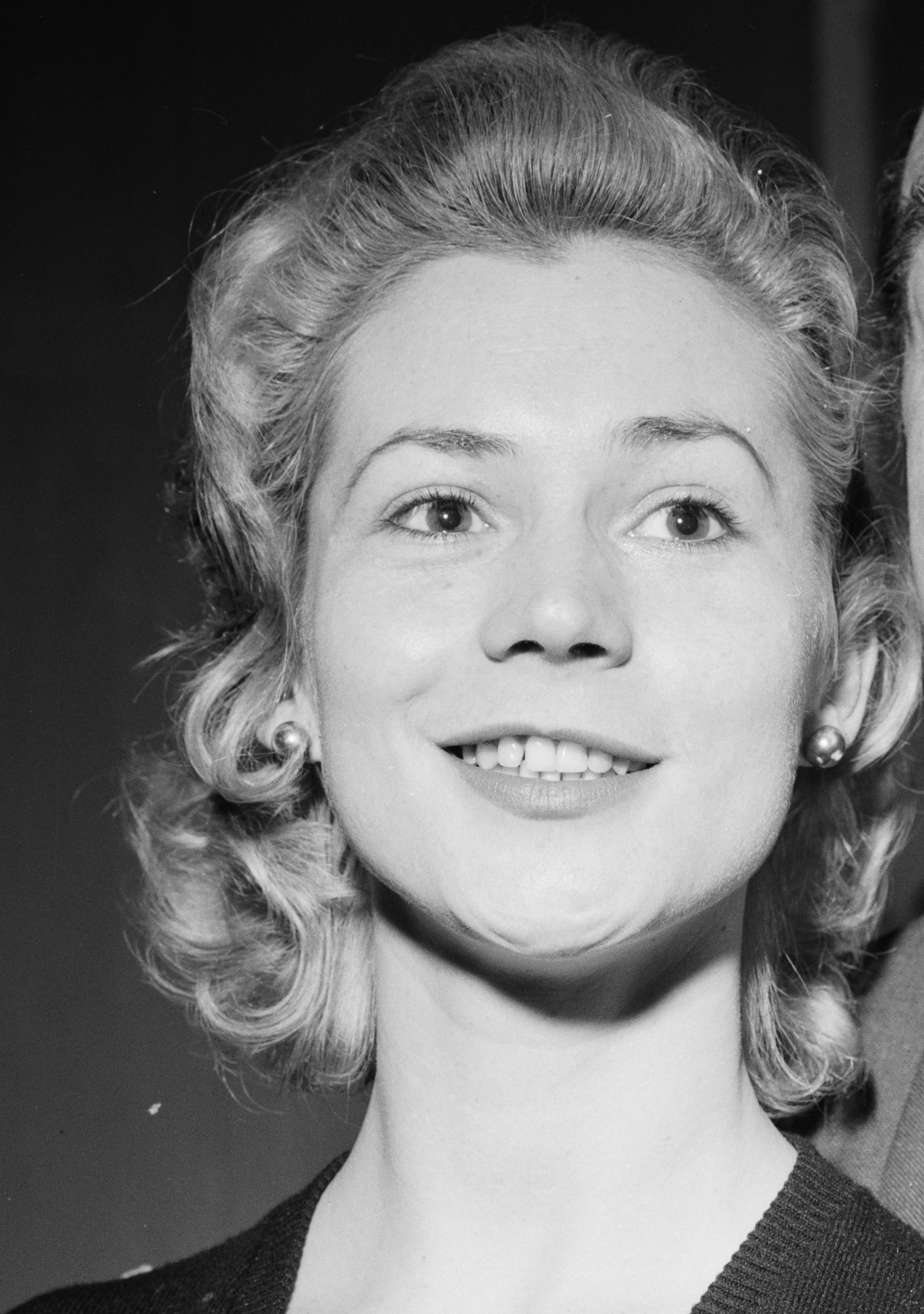
- Läubli in 1957
- Born: 3 April 1928 (age 98); Zürich, Canton of Zürich, Switzerland
- Occupations: Dancer, stage, television and film actress, comedian, cabarettist and radio personality
- Years active: since 1950
- Spouse: César Keiser (m. 1956; died 2007)
- Children: 2
- Website: Official website (in German)

Margrit Läubli (born 3 April 1928) is a Swiss actress, comedian, dancer and radio personality, starring usually in Swiss German language productions.

== Life and work ==
Born and raised in Zürich, Canton of Zürich in Switzerland to Margit née Schuhmacher and Friedrich, Margrit Läubli became a member of the ballet ensemble at the Stadttheater Zürich and received an urban scholarship for ballet training. At the same time she attended acting classes with Ellen Widmann, Josy Holsten and Gustav Knuth. Autumn of 1950 to spring of 1951, she appeared in the last programs of Cabaret Cornichon. From 1951 to 1957 Läubli she was a member of the Cabaret Federal, where she met César Keiser, her future husband and dance partner. In the meantime she played different roles in fairy tale productions at the Stadttheater Zürich, and in 1957 she played the main role in Frederick Lonsdale's "Mrs. Cheney's Ende" in the Theater am Central in Zürich.

In Keiser's first two solo programs (1962 and 1963) she performed as assistant director, in "Opus 3" of 1964, Keiser and Läubli first starred as a duo that became popular in Switzerland. On 18 April 1962 premiered his satirical program "César Keiser: Solo Programm" on Theater am Hechtplatz at Limmatquai Zürich, co-directed with Margrit Läubli. Exactly one year later, the second solo program "César Keiser: Opus 2" debuted on Hechtplatz stage, and from "Opus 3" (1964) Keiser and Läubli acted as a duo. Approximately every two years premiered a new "Opus" program until "Opus 13" (1989). In between, in 1972 "Opus Festival", a cross-section-anniversary program "Cabaret? Cabaret!" related to the history of the Swiss cabaret with historical texts in 1975, and in 1980 "Opus USA" followed by a US tour were among Keiser's further works. This was followed by "Opus 2000: Achtung Schnappschüsse!" in 1992, "Frisch geliftet!" in 1996, and in 2002 by the recapitulation program "Opus Feuerwerk". Almost all programs premiered at the Theater am Hechtplatz, then Keiser and Läubli went on tour in Switzerland and partly they gave guest performances in Germany, and in the United States, in Washington and New York. The programs were recorded on tape and on television. Keiser wrote the texts, in the first two programs supported by Fridolin Tschudi and later by Lorenz Keiser, Margrit Läubli's and his son. Among the longtime musical staff were René Gerber, Hans Moeckel, Werner Kruse, Bruno Spoerri, later Mathis Keiser (son of Läubli and Keiser). In addition to these duo programs, in 1976 Keiser and Läubli directed the exhibition "1916–1976: 60 Jahre Theater in der Schweiz" in the Helmhaus gallery-museum in Zürich. As commissioned works Keiser wrote the musical "Robinson" which premiered on 29 December 1979 at the Stadttheater St. Gallen. In the musical "Lueg uf zrugg Züri", she staged together with Keiser, alongside Elizabeth Quick, Noëmie Nadelmann, Ueli Beck, Ernst Stiefel and over eighty laymen actresses and actors, at the "Stadthof 11" theater in Zürich-Oerlikon. In 1995 Keiser and Läubli produced the Swiss German musical comedy "Wer zuletzt stirbt...", starring Keiser and among others Heinz Bühlmann and Mathis Keiser. Besides, Läubli provided permanently works for the Swiss radio, and in 1998 a jointly drafted duo program with Mathis Keiser: "The Lady Is a Tramp!", and a tribute to Frank Sinatra, again on the Hechtplatz stage.

From November 2012 to September 2014 Läubli toured in Switzerland and hold reading from the book Grosses César Keiser - Cabaretbuch. She also became popular by numerous radio appearances and roles in Swiss and German films, among them in Grüezi, Herr Nachbar! in 1954 and in the 2010 Swiss film Länger leben which was directed by her son Lorzenz.

== Personal life ==
Margrit Läubli married César Keiser (1925–2007) in 1956 and is the mother of Lorenz (born 1959) and Mathis Keiser (1958) who also became artists. After Keiser's death Margrit Läubli married again, and still lives in their common home.

== Filmography ==
- 1954: Grüezi, Herr Nachbar!
- 1955: Hanussen
- 1961: Chikita
- 2005: Making of Anjas Engel
- 2005: Anjas Engel (2005) (Television film)
- 2010: Länger leben

== Awards ==
Awards received by Läubli include:

- 1982: Literaturkommissionen der Zürcher Kantonsregierung und der Stadt Zürich.
- 1984: Auszeichnung für kulturelle Verdienste by the city of Zürich.
- 1990: Cornichon-Preis by Oltner Cabaret-Tage.
- 1999: Salzburger Ehrenstier.
- 2003: Goldplakette by Zuger Annemarie und Eugen Hotz-Stiftung,
- 2003: Ehren Prix Walo with César Keiser for their lifetime work.

== Literature ==
- César Keiser and Margrit Läubli: Das Grosse César Keiser Cabaret Buch. Huber Frauenfeld 2005, ISBN 3-7193-1400-6.
