= Nebelspalter =

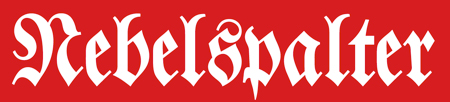
- Editor in Chief: Markus Somm
- Categories: political magazine
- Frequency: Monthly
- Publisher: Nebelspalter-Verlag
- Founded: 1875
- Country: Switzerland
- Based in: Zurich
- Language: German
- Website: Nebelspalter

The Nebelspalter is a Swiss satirical magazine, which also has a political orientation in its online platform. It was founded in 1875 by Jean Nötzli of Zurich as an "illustrated humorous political weekly." The magazine was modelled on British magazine Punch. It continued being a satirical magazine until the takeover and relaunch of the magazine by Markus Somm, though has been a monthly since late 1996. When Punch ceased publication in 2002, Nebelspalter became the oldest continually published humor magazine in the world.

== Becoming a national institution ==
The Nebelspalter — the title translates as "Fog-cleaver" — had its heyday in the 1930s, before and during the Second World War, when it denounced the acts of violence and ideology of the Nazis and of their followers in Switzerland, the Frontists. In 1933 Nebelspalter was banned in Germany. Meanwhile, its circulation in Switzerland increased rapidly: in 1922 when the Rorschach publisher Ernst Löpfe-Benz took over the Nebelspalter its circulation was only 364 copies, partly as a consequence of its unpopular stance during the First World War. In 1945 the circulation was 30,000. The Nebelspalter had developed into a "spearhead of intellectual defense" against National Socialism, and it took a similar stand against communism in the Cold War until the 1960s.

The popularity of the "Nebi", as it was called, was to a large extent due to the then editor-in-chief de:Carl Böckli (born September 23, 1889, died 4 December 1970), who was talented both as an illustrator and writer in the tradition of Wilhelm Busch. Under his pen name "Bö", he produced thousands of cartoons, drawings and texts until 1962. Circulation rose to 70,000 copies by the 1970s. For decades, the Nebelspalter was Switzerland's leading satirical medium and talent factory, associated with the biographies of such well known artists as René Gilsi, Jakob Nef, Fritz Behrendt, Nico Cadsky, and Horst Haitzinger, and of satirists such as César Keiser, Franz Hohler, Lorenz Keiser, Peter Root and Linard Bardill. The Uri painter Heinrich Danioth was a draftsman and illustrator for the Nebelspalter for 15 years. The poet Albert Ehrismann was on the staff for more than three decades and published over 1,600 poems published there.

== Crisis of the 1990s ==
The Nebelspalter could not keep up with the rapid development of the Swiss media landscape in the last third of the 20th Century. Cartoons, columns and other satirical forms migrated more and more into the daily press and the audiovisual media. As it became more conventional the magazine steadily lost subscribers and readers. In the 1990s, the radical realignment of the Nebelspalter under editor-in-chief Ivan Raschle following the style of the Frankfurt Titanic magazine failed. The circulation plummeted from 34,000 copies to 17,000, and the shrinking number of advertisements further aggravated the crisis. The editor changed several times and in 1996 the magazine was sold to the Friedrich Reinhardt Verlag of Basel. The frequency of the magazine was changed from weekly to monthly in 1996. With a circulation of 8000, the suspension of publication was announced at the end of April 1998.

== Signs of sustainable recovery ==
In 1998, the Thurgau publisher Thomas Engeli took over the ailing paper at the last minute. He managed to stop the loss of subscribers and readers and launch a new approach. Meanwhile, the magazine again had 200 regular text and image contributors. For its 130th anniversary in 2005, Nebelspalter ventured a gentle relaunch, apparently with some success. With a newly appointed editorial board under Marco Ratschiller the title underwent a face-lift leading toward an unpretentious journalistic style, and managed to win over well-known contemporary Swiss authors and satirists like Andreas Thiel, Simon Enzler, Pedro Lenz and Gion Mathias Cavelty. Early in 2010 Nebelspalter had a print run of 21,000 copies, and according to the market research study BasicMACH had 252,000 readers per issue. The Nebelspalter now appears ten times a year around the first Thursday of each month (except for double issues in January/February and August/September).

== Publishers ==
- Jean Nötzli, Zurich, 1875–1902
- Johann Friedrich Boscovits, Zurich, 1902–1914
- Jean Frey AG, Zurich, 1914–1921
- Ernst Löpfe-Benz AG, Rorschach, 1921–1996
- Friedrich Reinhardt AG, Basel, 1996–1998
- Engeli & Partner Verlag, Horn, 1998 - ?
- Nebelspalter-Verlag,
- Klarsicht AG, Zürich since 2021

== Chief editors ==
- Jean Nötzli, 1875–1900
- J. Hauser, 1900–1912
- Paul Altheer, 1914–1927
- Carl Böckli, 1927-1952 (picture editor until 1967)
- Franz Maechler, 1952–1984
- Werner Meyer-Léchot, 1984–1993
- Ivan Raschle, 1993–1996
- Jürg Vollmer, 1996
- Hans Suter, 2000–2004
- Marco Ratschiller, since 2005
- Markus Somm. since 2021

== See also ==
- Blandaren

== Literature ==
- Jenny, Hans A.: 111 years Nebelspalter. A satirical Swiss mirror, 1985.
- Child Hauser, Ernst et al. Böckli Carl. His time, his work, 1989.
- Knobel, Bruno: Switzerland in Nebelspalter. Cartoons 1875–1974, 1974.
- Böckli, Carl: So simmer. 84 drawings and verses by "Bö" from the Nebelspalter, 1955.
