= Ludwig-Karl Ratschiller =

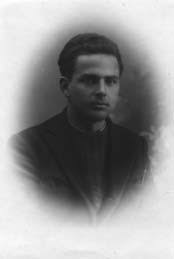
Ludwig-Karl Ratschiller

Ludwig-Karl Ratschiller (Brixen/Bressanone, 22 June 1921 – Bozen/Bolzano, March, 2004) was an Italian anti-Nazi partisan in North-Eastern Italy during World War II.

== Life ==
Ratschiller, an ethnic Austrian, was born in South Tyrol three years after the province had become Italian territory as a result of World War I. His parents were Ludwig-Andreas, an Austrian local-bank manager, jailed in 1944 on political grounds, and Marja Iwanicka, a Polish woman from Austro-Hungarian Galitia. The family spoke Polish at home, but the everyday language in the city of Brixen was dialectal German.

Italian Fascism implemented an aggressive policy of de-nationalization in the former Austro-Hungarian territories that had come under its sway. As a reaction, Ratschiller developed nationalistic German opinions, with a sympathy for Nazi Germany. In 1939, when South Tyroleans were given the opportunity to opt for the German nationality, his father chose to keep the Italian citizenship. Being under-age, Ratschiller was supposed to follow the same destiny, but instead he fled to Berlin. There he got his high-school diploma before he moved to Innsbruck to study geology at the local university. He volunteered for the SS corps but was not accepted. In the spring of 1941 he was in Alsace as a worker-student, then moved to Poland, where he witnessed the treatment of the Poles, visited the Warsaw ghetto and started developing his opposition to Nazism.

In 1942, as soon as he was naturalized as a German, he was drafted into the Luftwaffe and destined to Pruniers, in France, for a training course. From there he moved to Kirkenes, near Petsamo, in Finland, where the Wehrmacht faced the Red Army. By now disgusted with the war, he took advantage of a leave to go back to his family and home city and desert (March 1943). His efforts to hide, however, were unsuccessful, for the Italian Army, unaware of his new citizenship, had issued an arrest warrant for his failure to report for military service.

Ratschiller was sent to Fiume as a Black Shirt, i.e. a member of the Italian National Fascist Party's Militia. The Black Shirts in Fiume carried out tasks of border patrolling. In view of his Slavic background, Ratschiller understood some Croatian, so he soon had some contacts with the Yugoslav Resistance movement.

When Fascism fell on 24 July 1943, Ratschiller went AWOL and fled to Florence, where he had some family and could conceivably get their help. Realizing that the political situation had changed irreversibly, however, he decided to turn himself in to the military authorities. He was not indicted but had to enroll in the Military Corps of Engineers. After a few days, the armistice brought about the virtual dissolution of the Italian Army and Ratschiller went underground, getting himself a false identity. He could not go back to Brixen, because South Tyrol had been annexed by the Third Reich. Instead, he took refuge in nearby Cadore. On 1 May 1944, he joined the Italian Resistance and enrolled in the Brigata d'Assalto Garibaldi "Calvi", where he was put in charge of a camp for German POWs.

On 22 November he was taken prisoner by the Germans and tortured, but he escaped further consequences because the appointed new commander was a German officer that had been in his power as a POW before being released in a barter for a partisan. That officer had been treated fairly, so he released Ratschiller on condition that he enrolled in the Organisation Todt, the German entity that provided slave labor to the war effort. It was as a Todt slave laborer that the end of the war found him in South Tyrol, very close to his home in Brixen.

In the post-war period Ratschiller was a well-respected geologist.

== Books by and about Ratschiller ==
- Ludwig Ratschiller, Il compagno "Ludi" - Autobiografia di un partigiano, Bolzano, Circolo ANPI di Bolzano, 2005 (in Italian).
- Gerald Steinacher, Zwischen allen Fronten. Ludwig K. Ratschiller, Autobiografie eines Suedtiroler Partisanen, Bozen 2003, ISBN 978-88-7283-192-2 (in German).
- Geologie des Mastaun-Penaud-Gebietes in Schnals (Vintschgau): mit 2 Tab., Innsbruck, 1950 (Thesis).
- Beiträge zur regionalen Petrographie des Vintschgau-Gebietes (Südtirol), in Neues Jahrbuch für Mineralogie: Abhandlungen, 85, Stuttgart, 1953, pp. 247–302.
- Sahara: mineral resources - landscapes - people (records of a geologist), Bolzano, Eigenverlag Ratschiller, 2003, ISBN 88-86153-14-7.
- Steinacher, Gerald (2003). Zwischen allen Fronten. Ludwig K. Ratschiller: Autobiografie eines Südtiroler Partisanen. Bolzano: Raetia.
