= Werner Wehrli =

Swiss composer

Werner Wehrli (8 January 1892 – 27 June 1944) was a Swiss composer. He was one of the most renowned Swiss composers in the period between the world wars.

== Life ==
Born in Aarau, Wehrli had a solid musical education, which he acquired in Zurich, Berlin, Frankfurt and Basel. In Basel he completed his composition studies in 1918 with Hans Huber and Hermann Suter. His time in Frankfurt - where Wehrli studied as a fellow student of Paul Hindemith after winning the Frankfurt Mozart Prize in 1914, and where he met his future wife, the singer Irma Bartholomae - was of particular influence on his musical development. In 1918 Wehrli took up a position as a music teacher at the Aargauischen Lehrerinnenseminar (today Neue Kantonsschule Aarau) and held it until his death in 1944. In addition, he was active as music pedagogue, as folk song collector, bells expert, music writer and poet. As conductor, Wehrli conducted the Cäcilienverein Aarau from 1920 to 1929 and the Frauenchor Brugg from 1924 to 1939.

Since the twenties his reputation has grown steadily, which was expressed in performances of his song cycles and chamber music works at the annual Tonkünstlerfests, in performances of his stage works and repeated commissions for highly esteemed Festspiel music. Wehrli's musical work mediates between late Romanticism and modern, whereby it is characterized by an unusual variety of expressive attitudes. In his work there are folk elements, humorous and dreamy, but also cool and expressive. In 1954, Othmar Schoeck commented on Wehrli: "Whenever a new work by Werner Wehrli was announced, one knew: now comes something of one's own, inwardly directed, nothing laboriously sheltered, and one was never disappointed". Wehrli was active in almost all compositional genres. In addition to ambitious large-format works, his complete works also include numerous small pedagogical utility pieces.

Wehrli died in Lucerne at the age of 52.

== Discography ==
- Er ist’s and Zur Warnung, in Mörike-Vertonungen aus der Schweiz. Compact Disc, No. 15 & 16
- Im Bluescht I op. 2/1;Mis Chindli, in Lieder von Schweizer Komponisten. Zürich, 1994, No. 7–16
- Kammer Music on IMSLP
