= Karin Lesch =

Swiss-German stage, film and television actress (1935–2025)

- Born: 18 May 1935; Zürich, Switzerland
- Died: 12 March 2025 (aged 89); Königs Wusterhausen, Germany
- Occupation: Actress
- Years active: 1953–1974
- Spouse: Hans Dieter Mäde (m. 1957; died 2009)
- Children: 2, including Michael Mäde
- Parent(s): Walter Lesch (1898–1958); Mathilde Danegger (1903–1988)

Karin Lesch (18 May 1935 – 12 March 2025) was a Swiss-German stage, film, and television actress, of Swiss-Austrian extraction; who hailed from a multi-generational family of accomplished German-speaking performers of theatre and cinema.

Lesch was born in Zürich, the daughter of Swiss director, dramatist, and author Walter Lesch (1892–1958), and the Austrian actress Mathilde Danegger (1903–1988). In addition to both of her parents having professional careers in the German-speaking dramatic arts, Lesch comes from a family of Austrian entertainers of music, stage, and cinema. On her maternal side, her grandfather was the Austrian character-actor and director Josef Danegger, Snr (1866-1933), and her maternal grandmother Bertha Müller (1866-1938) was an Austrian actress of both stage and silent-film. Her uncle Josef Danneger, Jnr, (1889–1948) was an Austrian actor of stage and cinema, whilst her uncle Theodor Danegger (1891–1959) was both an opera singer and recording artist in addition to being an actor of stage and cinema, having performed in both musicals and operettas, as well as in purely dramatic roles.

== Early life ==
Due to Swiss neutrality, Lesh grew up unscathed by the effects of World War II, and the havoc wreaked on her mother's native Austria after its annexation by the Third Reich. After the War, however, Lesch's life changed radically with the breakdown of her parents marriage. Her mother took Lesch from her father and her native Switzerland, when she was only twelve years old, to live first in West Germany in 1947, and then, because of her mother's political convictions, to the newly formed (1949) communist East Germany in 1951, when Lesch was just sixteen.

== Education and career ==
A formally trained actress of both stage and cinema, as well as television, Lesch studied at the Staatlichen Schauspielschule (i.e. the (former) State Drama School, East Berlin), after which she received a contract with the Potsdam Theatre. She often played in different fairy-tale films, such as her role as the miller's daughter Marie in the film adaptation of the fairy tale Rumpelstiltskin in the 1960 television production Das Zaubermännchen.

To English-speaking audiences, Lesch is perhaps best known for her cinema role as the Queen in the 1973 East German – Czechoslovak co-production Three Wishes for Cinderella (The original German title is: Drei Haselnüsse für Aschenbrödel, and the original Czech title is: Tři oříšky pro Popelku). The film is based on a Bohemian version of the fairy tale Cinderella as written by the Czech National Revivalist writer Božena Němcová, with the storyline more closely related to the German version published by the Brothers Grimm in 1812, versus the somewhat different version more widely known in English that is based on the earlier French version published by Charles Perrault in 1697 (hence the reason for the role of the Queen, a character not found in the Anglo-French version of the fairy tale). The role having proved difficult to cast, once East German actor Rolf Hoppe had been given the part as the King, he suggested Karin Lesch, with whom he had enjoyed a professional relationship, having worked on stage with Lesch several times before. Although initially expected to screen-test, as all the other actresses who had vied for the part, the film's director Václav Vorlíček was so impressed, he gave Lesch the role after only a read-through.

Much like Dinner for One, the film has become a holiday classic being shown on television at Christmas-time every year in Germany, Switzerland, Austria, the Czech Republic, Slovakia, parts of Scandinavia – especially Norway – as well as elsewhere in Europe during the holiday season. The movie was shot in both German and Czech, with the cast members each speaking their lines in their own language, and with extensive post-filming work carried out so that two versions of the original were released, one with the Czech lines dubbed into German, and the other with the German lines dubbed into Czech, and employed what, at the time, was the newly developed technique of synchronisation to create a more visually realistic effect of speech emanating from the lips whenever the dialogue was being dubbed.

Both a gifted linguist, as well as a professional voice artist – in addition to her work as a dramatic actress – after shooting Three Gifts for Cinderella in German, her mother tongue, Lesch dubbed the same role she played for the production's Czech release. This made her one of only three of the fourteen cast members with speaking-parts who were asked to provide their own voices for their respective roles in both the German and Czechoslovak versions; (although Czech actress Vlasta Fialová is credited as having provided the voice used in what became the official release of Tři oříšky pro Popelku).

At least two versions exist in English, viz: One dubbed without lip-synchronisation, whilst another uses an omniscient narrator in voice-over, as the actors can still be faintly heard to give their original lines in their own languages.

== Post-theatrical career ==
Lesch lead a private life, avoiding both public and media attention. On 23 December 2013, however, she granted a very rare interview to the Tagblatt der Stadt Zürich – a paper from her hometown of Zürich – in commemoration of the 40th anniversary of Drei Haselnüsse für Aschenbrödel, where she spoke about both the film, as well as memories of her childhood in Switzerland. Lesch also spoke of her only visit to Zürich in 1991, after the fall of the East Bloc when she was free to travel, and the enjoyment she felt in revisiting old haunts from her childhood after an absence of some forty-four years.

== Personal life and death ==
Lesch married East German producer-director Hans Dieter Mäde (1930–2009), who later became the Director General of DEFA, the state-owned film studio in the former German Democratic Republic.

Lesch remained in the East through the turbulence leading up to the 1990 Reunification of Germany, and the period of adjustment in its aftermath, where she continued to live, now widowed and in retirement, in the Berlin-Brandenburg Metropolitan Region of Brandenburg in eastern Germany.

Her son Michael Mäde, born in 1962, is a screenwriter, author, and member of the German Writers Guild, who lives in nearby Berlin.

Lesch died in Königs Wusterhausen on 12 March 2025, at the age of 89.

== Filmography ==
=== Film and television ===
- 1953: Matthias Löffelchen, der Osterhase, i.e. Matthias Rabbit-Ears, The Easter Bunny, (a made for Television Movie).
- 1959: Eine alte Liebe, i.e. An Old Love, in the role of ‘Sabine Schröder’.
- 1960: Das Zaubermännchen, i.e. The Magic Little Man, an adaptation of Grimm's Rumpelstiltskin, in the role of ‘Marie’, the miller's daughter.
- 1960: Morgen Abend um sieben, i.e. Tomorrow Evening at Seven, (a made for Television Movie).
- 1961: Der Tod hat ein Gesicht, i.e. Death has a Face, as the young nun and hospital nurse.
- 1968: Die Toten bleiben jung, i.e. The Dead Remain Young, in the role of ‘Lenore’.
- 1970: Die Nächte des Zorns, i.e. Nights of Wrath, in the role of ‘Louise Cordeau’ (a made for Television Movie), directed by her husband Hans-Dieter Mäde of DEFA.
- 1971: KLK an PTX – Die Rote Kapelle, i.e. (KLK Calling PTZ – The Red Orchestra), in the historical role of anti-Nazi and resistance fighter, physician Elfriede Paul.
- 1973: Three Wishes for Cinderella in the role of ‘the Queen’.
- 1974: Die Geisterfalle, i.e. The Ghost Trap, (a made for Television Movie), again directed by her husband Hans-Dieter Mäde of DEFA.
