= Andreas Ratschiller =

Austrian ice hockey player

- Born: November 28, 1983 (age 41); Austria
- Height: 5 ft 10 in (178 cm)
- Weight: 165 lb (75 kg; 11 st 11 lb)
- Position: Defence
- Austria3 team Former teams: EC Oilers Salzburg; EC Red Bull Salzburg (ERSTE)
- NHL draft: Undrafted
- Playing career: 2001–present

Andreas Ratschiller (born November 28, 1983) is an Austrian ice hockey player. He is currently playing with EC Oilers Salzburg in the Austrian Oberliga.

During the 2004–05 season, Ratschiller played two games with EC Red Bull Salzburg of the Austrian Hockey League
