= Cabaret Cornichon =

Swiss cabaret company

The Cabaret Cornichon (English: Gherkin cabaret) was a Swiss cabaret company.

It existed from 1934 to 1951 and was founded by Otto Weissert, Walter Lesch, Emil Hegetschweiler and Alois Carigiet. They were later joined by, among others, Max Werner Lenz, Elsie Attenhofer, Voli Geiler, Margrit Rainer, Ruedi Walter, Heinrich Gretler, Zarli Carigiet, Karl Meier and Alfred Rasser. The musical director was the pianist, Nico Kaufmann. From autumn 1950 to spring of 1951, Margrit Läubli appeared in the last programs of Cabaret Cornichon.

The Cabaret Cornichon was essentially an entertainment cabaret but, inspired by the ideals of what later became known as 'Geistige Landesverteidigung' ('national' spiritual defence), it also opposed fascism and Nazism. The term "Geistige Landesverteidigung" refers to the strong and widespread political will of the Swiss to defend the country’s independence and democratic constitution against the Nazis. The cabaret was established in opposition to the right-wing organization known as the ‘Frontenbewegung’, whose views mirrored those of the National Socialist Party in Germany.

After the Second World War, the cabaret split up amid the political tensions of the Cold War. While some of its members sided with the political left, those in opposition founded the Cabaret Fédéral in 1949.
