= List of Swiss films =

This is a list of films produced in Switzerland. For an A-Z list see Category:Swiss films.

== 1920s ==
Title	Director	Cast	Genre	Notes
1920
1921
Histoire de Monsieur Vieux-bois	Robert Collard, Cavé		Animation	Available online
1922

== 1930s ==
Title	Director	Cast	Genre	Notes
1930
1931
1932
Tannenberg	Heinz Paul	Hans Stüwe, Käthe Haack	War	Swiss-German co-production
1933
1934
William Tell	Heinz Paul	Hans Marr, Conrad Veidt	Historical	Swiss-German co-production
1935
Demon of the Himalayas	Andrew Marton	Gustav Diessl, Erika Dannhoff	Adventure	
The Eternal Mask	Werner Hochbaum	Peter Petersen, Mathias Wieman	Drama	Swiss-Austrian co-production
1936
Fräulein Veronika	Veit Harlan	Thekla Ahrens, Carl Esmond	Comedy	Swiss-Austrian co-production
The Postman from Longjumeau	Carl Lamac	Carl Esmond, Rose Stradner	Musical comedy	Swiss-Austrian co-production
Die Schmierkobolde	Julius Pinschewer		Animation	
Where the Lark Sings	Carl Lamac	Mártha Eggerth, Alfred Neugebauer	Musical	Swiss-German-Hungarian co-production
1937
Kleine Scheidegg	Richard Schweizer	Leopold Biberti, Emil Hegetschweiler	Drama	
1938
Die drei Bäume	Julius Pinschewer		Animation	
Fusilier Wipf	Hermann Haller, Leopold Lindtberg	Paul Hubschmid, Heinrich Gretler	Drama	
Giuochi nella schiuma	Julius Pinschewer		Animation	
1939
Constable Studer	Leopold Lindtberg	Heinrich Gretler, Anne-Marie Blanc	Crime	
Schweizer Sinfonie	Julius Pinschewer		Animation	

== 1940s ==
Title	Director	Cast	Genre	Notes
1940
1941
Kampf dem Hunger	Julius Pinschewer		Animation	
Die kleine Kartoffel	Julius Pinschewer		Animation	
Paradisia	Julius Pinschewer		Animation	
A Village Romeo and Juliet	Hans Trommer, Valérien Schmidely	Erwin Kohlund, Margrit Winter	Drama	
1942
Gilberte de Courgenay	Franz Schnyder	Rudolf Bernhard, Anne-Marie Blanc	Biopic	
1943
1944
Marie-Louise	Leopold Lindtberg	Josiane Hegg, Heinrich Gretler	Drama	
1945
The Last Chance (Die Letzte Chance)	Leopold Lindtberg	Ewart G. Morrison, John Hoy, Ray Reagan	Drama	Won Golden Globe and Grand Prize in Cannes
1946
1947
Madness Rules	Leopold Lindtberg	Heinrich Gretler, Heinz Woester	Crime	
1948
The Search (Die Gezeichneten)	Fred Zinnemann	Montgomery Clift, Aline MacMahon	Drama	American-Swiss co-production
1949

== 1950s ==
Title	Director	Cast	Genre	Notes
1950
1951
Bluebeard	Christian-Jaque	Hans Albers, Fritz Kortner, Cécile Aubry	Comedy	French-West German-Swiss co-production
Four in a Jeep	Leopold Lindtberg, Elizabeth Montagu	Ralph Meeker, Viveca Lindfors	Drama	
1952
Heidi	Luigi Comencini	Elsbeth Sigmund, Heinrich Gretler	Family movie, drama	
Palace Hotel	Emil Berna, Leonard Steckel	Paul Hubschmid, Claude Farell	Drama	
The Secret of the Mountain Lake	Jean Dréville	Lil Dagover, Marcelle Géniat	Drama	Co-production with West Germany
1953
The Venus of Tivoli	Leonard Steckel	Hilde Krahl, Paul Hubschmid, Heinrich Gretler	Drama	
The Village	Leopold Lindtberg			Entered into the 1953 Cannes Film Festival and the 3rd Berlin International Film Festival
1954
Uli the Farmhand	Franz Schnyder	Hannes Schmidhauser, Liselotte Pulver	Romance	
1955
Heidi and Peter	Franz Schnyder	Heinrich Gretler, Elsbeth Sigmund	Family/drama	Sequel to the 1952 film Heidi
Uli the Tenant	Franz Schnyder	Hannes Schmidhauser, Liselotte Pulver	Comedy drama	
1956
The Mountains Between Us	Franz Schnyder	Hannes Schmidhauser, Nelly Borgeaud, Peter Arens	Drama	
1957
Der 10. Mai	Franz Schnyder			Entered into the 8th Berlin International Film Festival
The King of Bernina	Alfred Lehner	Helmuth Schneider, Waltraut Haas	Historical drama	Co-production with Austria
1958
The Cheese Factory in the Hamlet	Franz Schnyder	Annemarie Düringer, Franz Matter	Historical comedy	
It Happened in Broad Daylight	Ladislao Vajda	Heinz Rühmann, Gert Fröbe, Michel Simon	Thriller	Swiss-West German-Spanish co-production. Entered into the 8th Berlin International Film Festival.
Ludmila	Georg Tressler	Maximilian Schell, Barbara Rütting	Drama	Co-production with Liechtenstein
1959
The Model Husband	Karl Suter	Walter Roderer, Silvia Frank	Comedy	

== 1960s ==
Title	Director	Cast	Genre	Notes
1960
Sacred Waters	Alfred Weidenmann	Hansjörg Felmy, Cordula Trantow, Hanns Lothar, Gustav Knuth	Drama	
William Tell	Michel Dickoff			Entered into the 2nd Moscow International Film Festival
1961
The Shadows Grow Longer	Ladislao Vajda	Hansjörg Felmy, Luise Ullrich, Barbara Rütting	Drama	Swiss-West German co-production
1962
The Constant Wife	Tom Pevsner	Lilli Palmer, Peter van Eyck, Carlos Thompson	Comedy	Co-production with West Germany
1963
1964
1965
Diamonds Are Brittle	Nicolas Gessner	Claude Rich, Jean Seberg, Elsa Martinelli, Elisabeth Flickenschildt, Günther Ungeheuer	Crime comedy	French-Swiss-West German-Italian co-production
1966
1967
The Unknown Man of Shandigor	Jean-Louis Roy			Entered into the 1967 Cannes Film Festival
1968
The Colonel's Nieces	Erwin C. Dietrich	Kai Fischer		
1969

== 1970s ==
Title	Director	Cast	Genre	Notes
1970
Black Out	Jean-Louis Roy	Marcel Merminod		Entered into the 20th Berlin International Film Festival
1971
The Light at the Edge of the World	Kevin Billington	Kirk Douglas, Yul Brynner, Samantha Eggar		Spanish-American-Swiss co-production
The Salamander	Alain Tanner	Bulle Ogier		
1972
Der Fall	Kurt Früh	Walo Lüönd, Katrin Buschor, Annemarie Düringer	Drama	
The Surveyors	Michel Soutter	Jean-Luc Bideau		Entered into the 1972 Cannes Film Festival
Tonight or Never	Daniel Schmid	Ingrid Caven, Peter Kern, Harry Baer		
1973
The Invitation	Claude Goretta	Jean-Luc Bideau, Jean Champion, Jacques Rispal, Michel Robin, François Simon, Cécile Vassort		Won the Jury Prize at the 1973 Cannes Film Festival
The Pedestrian	Maximilian Schell	Gustav Rudolf Sellner, Peter Hall, Christian Kohlund, Gila von Weitershausen	Drama	Swiss-West German co-production
1974
General Idi Amin Dada: A Self Portrait	Barbet Schroeder		Biography	Swiss-French co-production
The Middle of the World	Alain Tanner	Olimpia Carlisi, Philippe Léotard		
La Paloma	Daniel Schmid	Ingrid Caven, Peter Kern, Bulle Ogier		
1975
Assassination in Davos	Rolf Lyssy	Peter Bollag, Gert Haucke	Thriller	
1976
Jack the Ripper	Jesús Franco	Klaus Kinski	Horror	West German-Swiss co-production
Jonah Who Will Be 25 in the Year 2000	Alain Tanner	Miou-Miou	Drama	
Krock & Co.	Rainer Wolffhardt	Hans Heinz Moser	Crime	
Shadow of Angels	Daniel Schmid	Klaus Löwitsch, Ingrid Caven, Rainer Werner Fassbinder, Ulli Lommel	Drama	Entered into the 1976 Cannes Film Festival
Der Stumme	Gaudenz Meili	Wolf Kaiser, Hanna Schygulla, Uli Krohm, Günter Lamprecht	Drama	
The Sudden Loneliness of Konrad Steiner	Kurt Gloor	Sigfrit Steiner	Drama	Entered into the 26th Berlin International Film Festival
1977
Providence	Alain Resnais	John Gielgud, Dirk Bogarde, Ellen Burstyn, David Warner		
Thaw	Markus Imhoof	Gila von Weitershausen, Arthur Brauss, Niels Arestrup	Drama	
Violanta	Daniel Schmid	Maria Schneider, Lucia Bosé, Lou Castel, Ingrid Caven, François Simon, Gérard Depardieu	Drama	
Women in Cellblock 9	Jesús Franco			
1978
Alzire, or The New Continent	Thomas Koerfer	Monica Bleibtreu, Rüdiger Vogler, Hans Peter Korff, Wolfram Berger, François Simon, Roger Jendly	Drama	Swiss-West German co-production
Kneuss	Gaudenz Meili	Ingold Wildenauer, Harald Leipnitz		
The Swissmakers	Rolf Lyssy	Emil Steinberger, Walo Lüönd	Comedy	Highest-grossing movie in Switzerland until 1997
1979
Der Chinese	Kurt Gloor	Hans Heinz Moser	Crime	
Les petites fugues	Yves Yersin	Michel Robin	Comedy	Entered into the 1979 Cannes Film Festival
Messidor	Alain Tanner	Clémentine Amouroux, Catherine Rétoré	Drama	Entered into the 29th Berlin International Film Festival

== 1980s ==
Title	Director	Cast	Genre	Notes
1980
Matto regiert	Wolfgang Panzer	Hans Heinz Moser	Crime	
Palermo or Wolfsburg	Werner Schroeter			Swiss-West German co-production
1981
The Boat Is Full	Markus Imhoof			Won a Silver Bear at Berlin
The Homeless One	Villi Hermann			Entered into the 13th Moscow International Film Festival
The Inventor	Kurt Gloor	Bruno Ganz		Entered into the 31st Berlin International Film Festival
Kassettenliebe	Rolf Lyssy	Emil Steinberger, Franziska Oehme	Comedy	
E nachtlang Füürland	Clemens Klopfenstein; Remo Legnazzi	Max Rüdlinger, Christine Lauterburg		
Teheran 43	Aleksandr Alov, Vladimir Naumov	Alain Delon, Curd Jürgens		Soviet-French-Swiss co-production
1982
Hécate	Daniel Schmid	Bernard Giraudeau, Lauren Hutton		Entered into the 33rd Berlin International Film Festival
Les Maîtres du temps	René Laloux, Tibor Hernádi (technical director)	Jean Valmont, Michel Elias, Frédéric Legros, Yves-Marie Maurin, Monique Thierry, Sady Rebbot	Independent animated science fiction	French-Swiss-West German-British-Hungarian co-production
1983
The Death of Mario Ricci	Claude Goretta	Gian Maria Volonté, Magali Noël, Heinz Bennent		Won the Best Actor award at the 1983 Cannes Film Festival
Embers	Thomas Koerfer	Armin Mueller-Stahl, Katharina Thalbach, Krystyna Janda, Matthias Habich	Drama	
In the White City	Alain Tanner	Bruno Ganz		Entered into the 33rd Berlin International Film Festival
1984
Dangerous Moves	Richard Dembo	Michel Piccoli		Academy Award for Best Foreign Language Film
Man Without Memory	Kurt Gloor	Michael König, Hannelore Elsner		Entered into the 34th Berlin International Film Festival
1985
Alpine Fire	Fredi M. Murer			
Derborence	Francis Reusser			Entered into the 1985 Cannes Film Festival
Tanner	Xavier Koller			
1986
1987
Deshima	Beat Kuert	Leon Askin, Marius Müller-Westernhagen, Kaho Minami, Miyoko Akaza	Drama	Swiss-West German-Japanese co-production
Jenatsch	Daniel Schmid	Michel Voïta, Christine Boisson, Vittorio Mezzogiorno, Carole Bouquet		Screened at the 1987 Cannes Film Festival
Rotlicht!	Urs Odermatt	Uwe Ochsenknecht	Comedy	
1988
Broken Silence	Walter Deuber, Peter Stierlin	Ursula Andress, Paul Hubschmid, Lukas Ammann, Anne-Marie Blanc, Stephanie Glaser, Ruedi Walter, Hannes Schmidhauser, Mathias Gnädinger	Thriller	
Die Dollarfalle	Thomas Koerfer	Uwe Ochsenknecht	Crime	
La méridienne	Jean-François Amiguet	Kristin Scott Thomas		Screened at the 1988 Cannes Film Festival
Quicker Than the Eye	Nicolas Gessner	Ben Gazzara, Mary Crosby, Jean Yanne, Ivan Desny, Christoph Waltz	Thriller	Swiss-Austrian-West German-French co-production
1989
Bankomatt	Villi Hermann	Bruno Ganz		Entered into the 39th Berlin International Film Festival
The Favorite	Jack Smight	Maud Adams, F. Murray Abraham		
Leo Sonnyboy	Rolf Lyssy	Mathias Gnädinger, Ankie Lau, Christian Kohlund, Dieter Meier	Comedy	
Tennessee Waltz	Nicolas Gessner	Julian Sands, Stacey Dash, Ned Beatty, Rod Steiger	Thriller	

== 1990s ==
Title	Director	Cast	Genre	Notes
1990
All Out	Thomas Koerfer	Dexter Fletcher, Fabienne Babe, Uwe Ochsenknecht	Crime	
Angels	Jacob Berger			Entered into the 40th Berlin International Film Festival
Journey of Hope	Xavier Koller			Academy Award for Best Foreign Language Film
1991
Always & Forever	Samir			Entered into the 17th Moscow International Film Festival
Behind Locked Doors	Anka Schmid			
The Mountain	Markus Imhoof	Susanne Lothar, Mathias Gnädinger, Peter Simonischek		Entered into the 41st Berlin International Film Festival
1992
Children of the Open Road	Urs Egger	Jasmin Tabatabai		
Night on Fire	Markus Fischer	Bruno Ganz, Barbara Auer, Rolf Hoppe, Dietmar Schönherr		
Off Season	Daniel Schmid	Sami Frey, Geraldine Chaplin, Ingrid Caven, Andréa Ferréol		French-Swiss-German co-production
The Shadow	Claude Goretta	Jacques Perrin, Pierre Arditi, Gudrun Landgrebe, Julie Jézéquel		
1993
The Diary of Lady M	Alain Tanner	Myriam Mézières		
Three Colors: Blue	Krzysztof Kieślowski			French-Polish-Swiss co-production
1994
Constable Zumbühl	Urs Odermatt	Michael Gwisdek, Anica Dobra, Jürgen Vogel, Rolf Hoppe		
Jazz	Daniel Helfer	Pasquale Aleardi		
Three Colors: White	Krzysztof Kieślowski			French-Polish-Swiss co-Production; premiered 29 January
Three Colors: Red	Krzysztof Kieślowski			French-Polish-Swiss co-production; premiered 16 May
1995
Adultery: A User's Guide	Christine Pascal			
Before Sunrise	Richard Linklater			
Silent Night	Dani Levy			Entered into the 46th Berlin International Film Festival
1996
Broken Silence	Wolfgang Panzer			
Fourbi	Alain Tanner			Screened at the 1996 Cannes Film Festival
1997
Blue Mountain	Thomas Tanner			Entered into the 20th Moscow International Film Festival
Debt of Love	Andreas Gruber	Sandrine Bonnaire, Rüdiger Vogler, Hanns Zischler		Austrian-Swiss-French co-production
Flames in Paradise	Markus Imhoof	Élodie Bouchez		
1998
Fögi Is a Bastard	Marcel Gisler			
Full Moon	Fredi M. Murer			
1999
Beresina, or the Last Days of Switzerland	Daniel Schmid		Satirical comedy	Screened at the 1999 Cannes Film Festival
Pas de café, pas de télé, pas de sexe	Romed Wyder		Dramatic comedy	
General Sutter	Benny Fasnacht	Werner Bachofen, Hannes Schmidhauser	Historical	

== 2000s ==
Title	Director	Cast	Genre	Notes
2000
Angry Kisses	Judith Kennel			Entered into the 22nd Moscow International Film Festival
Family Pack (Que faisaient les femmes pendant que l'homme marchait sur la lune?)	Chris Vander Stappen	Marie Bunel, Hélène Vincent, Mimie Mathy, Tsilla Chelton, Macha Grenon, Christian Crahay, Emmanuel Bilodeau	Drama	Belgian, French, Swiss and Canadian coproduction
Joy Ride	Martin Rengell			
2001
The Journey to Kafiristan	Fosco Dubini, Donatello Dubini	Jeanette Hain, Nina Petri	Adventure	Swiss-German-Dutch co-production
Kilimanjaro: How to spell Love!	Mike Eschmann	Martin Rapold, Gesine Cukrowski, Stefan Gubser, Inigo Callo, Eliane Chappuis	Comedy	
2002
Ready, Steady, Charlie!		Michael Koch	Comedy	Original title Achtung, Fertig, Charlie!
Crisis in Havana		Viktor Giacobbo, Mike Müller	Comedy	Original title Ernstfall in Havanna
2003
2004
Absolut	Romed Wyder		Psychological thriller	
Bienvenue en Suisse	Léa Fazer			Screened at the 2004 Cannes Film Festival
Deuteronomium - Der Tag des jüngsten Gerichts	Roger Grolimund	Denise Meili, Tobias Durband, Samuel Binkert, Mario Scarpellini	Horror	Direct-to-video
Love Express	Elena Hazanov	Mathilda May, Vincent Winterhalter, Sibylle Blanc, Carlos Leal, Roberto Bestazzoni	Comedy	
The Man with No Shadow (L'Homme sans ombre)	Georges Schwizgebel		Animated short	
Sternenberg	Christoph Schaub	Mathias Gnädinger, Sara Capretti	Comedy	Nominated for Swiss Film Prize 2005
Strähl	Manuel Flurin Hendry		Drama	
Stupid Boy (Garçon stupide)	Lionel Baier	Pierre Chatagny	Comedy drama	
The Ring Thing	Marc Schippert	Edward Piccin	Parody	low budget
2005
Clean	Geoffrey Engelbrecht		Short film	Best Short Film at Lausanne Underground Film and Music Festival
Maria Bethânia: Music Is Perfume	Georges Gachot		Documentary	
Snow White	Samir	Julie Fournier, Carlos Leal		
We Are The Faithful			Documentary	
Your Happiness Depends on Me	Sören Senn	Saïda Jawad, Carina Wiese		
2006
Eden	Michael Hofmann	Josef Ostendorf, Charlotte Roche, Devid Striesow		
Das Fräulein	Andrea Štaka	Mirjana Karanović, Marija Škaričić, Ljubica Jović		
Grounding	Michael Steiner		Drama	
Lenz	Thomas Imbach	Milan Peschel		
2007
Love And Mania	Michael C. Huber	Sibylle Canonica, Michael Koch	Drama	
Late Bloomers	Bettina Oberli	Stephanie Glaser	Drama	Original title Die Herbstzeitlosen
Marmorera	Markus Fischer	Eva Dewaele, Anatole Taubman, Mavie Hörbiger	Mystery, Horror	
Vitus	Fredi M. Murer		Drama	
2008
Geld oder Leben	Roger Mäder	Daniel Rohr	Comedy	
Home	Ursula Meier	Isabelle Huppert		
Happy New Year	Christoph Schaub			Entered into the 31st Moscow International Film Festival
The last blast	Sohm Offös	Mimie Lagrande, Heinz Hoenig	Road movie	
2009
Cargo	Ivan Engler		Science fiction	
The Welfare Worker	Lutz Konermann	Roeland Wiesnekker	Comedy	

== 2010s ==
Title	Director	Cast	Genre	Notes
2010
The Day of the Cat	Wolfgang Panzer	Bruno Ganz, Ulrich Tukur, Marie Bäumer, Christiane Paul, Walo Lüönd	Drama	Swiss-German co-production
Sennentuntschi	Michael Steiner	Roxane Mesquida, Andrea Zogg, Carlos Leal and Nicholas Ofczarek	Horror, mystery	Swiss-Austrian co-production
2011
The Foster Boy	Markus Imboden	Max Hubacher, Katja Riemann, Stefan Kurt	Drama	
Hell	Tim Fehlbaum	Hannah Herzsprung, Stipe Erceg and Lisa Vicari	Apocalyptic and post-apocalyptic fiction	Swiss-German co-production
One Way Trip 3D	Markus Welter	3D Film		
2012
More than Honey	Markus Imhoof		Documentary	
Sister	Ursula Meier	Léa Seydoux, Kacey Mottet Klein	Drama	Swiss-French co-production
Someone Like Me	Xavier Koller	Carla Juri	Drama	
2013
Keep Rollin'	Stefan Hillebrand, Oliver Paulus	Joel Basman, Anna Unterberger	Comedy	Swiss-German co-production
Longwave (Les Grandes ondes (à l'ouest))	Lionel Baier	Valérie Donzelli, Michel Vuillermoz, Patrick Lapp, Francisco Belard	Comedy-drama	Swiss-French-Portuguese co-production
Lovely Louise	Bettina Oberli	Stanley Townsend, Annemarie Düringer, Stefan Kurt, Nina Proll	Comedy-drama	Swiss-German co-production
Mary Queen of Scots	Thomas Imbach	Camille Rutherford	Biography	
Night Train to Lisbon	Bille August	Jeremy Irons, Melanie Laurent, Jack Huston, Bruno Ganz, Christopher Lee, Charlotte Rampling, Lena Olin, Tom Courtenay, Martina Gedeck, August Diehl	Mystery drama	
Rosie	Marcel Gisler		Drama	
Die schwarzen Brüder	Xavier Koller	Moritz Bleibtreu, Ruby O. Fee, Richy Müller, Fynn Henkel	Drama	
2014
List of Swiss films of 2014				
2015
Dawn	Romed Wyder	Joel Basman, Jason Isaacs, Sarah Adler	Historical drama	Swiss-British-German co-production
Dora or the Sexual Neuroses of Our Parents (Dora oder Die sexuellen Neurosen unserer Eltern)	Stina Werenfels	Victoria Schulz	Drama	
Heidi	Alain Gsponer	Bruno Ganz, Anuk Steffen	Family	
Vanity (La Vanité)	Lionel Baier	Patrick Lapp, Carmen Maura, Ivan Georgiev	Drama	
2016
My Life as a Zucchini	Claude Barras			French-Swiss co-production
Ted Sieger's Molly Monster			Animation	
2017
The Divine Order (Die göttliche Ordnung)	Petra Volpe	Marie Leuenberger, Maximilian Simonischek, Rachel Braunschweig, Sibylle Brunner, Marta Zoffoli, Bettina Stucky	Comedy-drama	
2018
Female Pleasure	Barbara Miller		Documentary	
Hide and Seek (Amur senza fin)	Christoph Schaub	Rebecca Indermaur, Bruno Cathomas, Tonia Maria Zindel, Murali Perumal	Romantic comedy-drama	Romansh-language television film
The Innocent (Der Unschuldige)	Simon Jaquemet	Judith Hofmann, Naomi Scheiber, Thomas Schuepbach	Drama	Swiss-German coproduction
2019
All Cats Are Grey in the Dark (Nachts sind alle Katzen grau)	Lasse Linder		Short documentary	

== 2020s ==
Title	Director	Cast	Genre	Notes
2020
My Little Sister	Stéphanie Chuat, Véronique Reymond	Nina Hoss, Lars Eidinger, Marthe Keller	Drama	
Needle Park Baby	Pierre Monnard	Luna Mwezi, Sarah Spale, Jerry Hoffmann	Drama	Original Title "Platzspitzbaby"
2021
Beautiful Minds (Presque)	Bernard Campan, Alexandre Jollien	Bernard Campan, Alexandre Jollien	Comedy-drama	
The Girl and the Spider (Das Mädchen und die Spinne)	Ramon Zürcher, Silvan Zürcher	Henriette Confurius, Liliane Amuat	Drama	
2022
De Humani Corporis Fabrica	Lucien Castaing-Taylor, Véréna Paravel		Documentary	France-Switzerland coproduction
Thunder (Foudre)	Carmen Jaquier	Lilith Grasmung	Drama	
Mad Heidi	Johannes Hartmann and Sandro Klopfstein	Alice Lucy, David Schofield, Casper Van Dien	Comedy Action Horror	
2023
Sisi & I	Frauke Finsterwalder	Susanne Wolff, Sandra Hüller, Stefan Kurt, Tom Rhys Harries	Biography/Drama	Germany-Switzerland-Austria coproduction
2024
Hanami	Denise Fernandes	Dailma Mendes, Sanaya Andrade, Alice da Luz	Drama	Switzerland-Portugal-Cape Verde coproduction
2025
The Safe House	Lionel Baier	Michel Blanc, Dominique Reymond	Comedy-drama	France, Switzerland and Luxembourg co-production
Late Shift	Petra Volpe	Leonie Benesch	Drama	Switzerland and Germany co-production
The Lake	Fabrice Aragno	Clotilde Courau	Drama	Switzerland
