= Prix Walo =

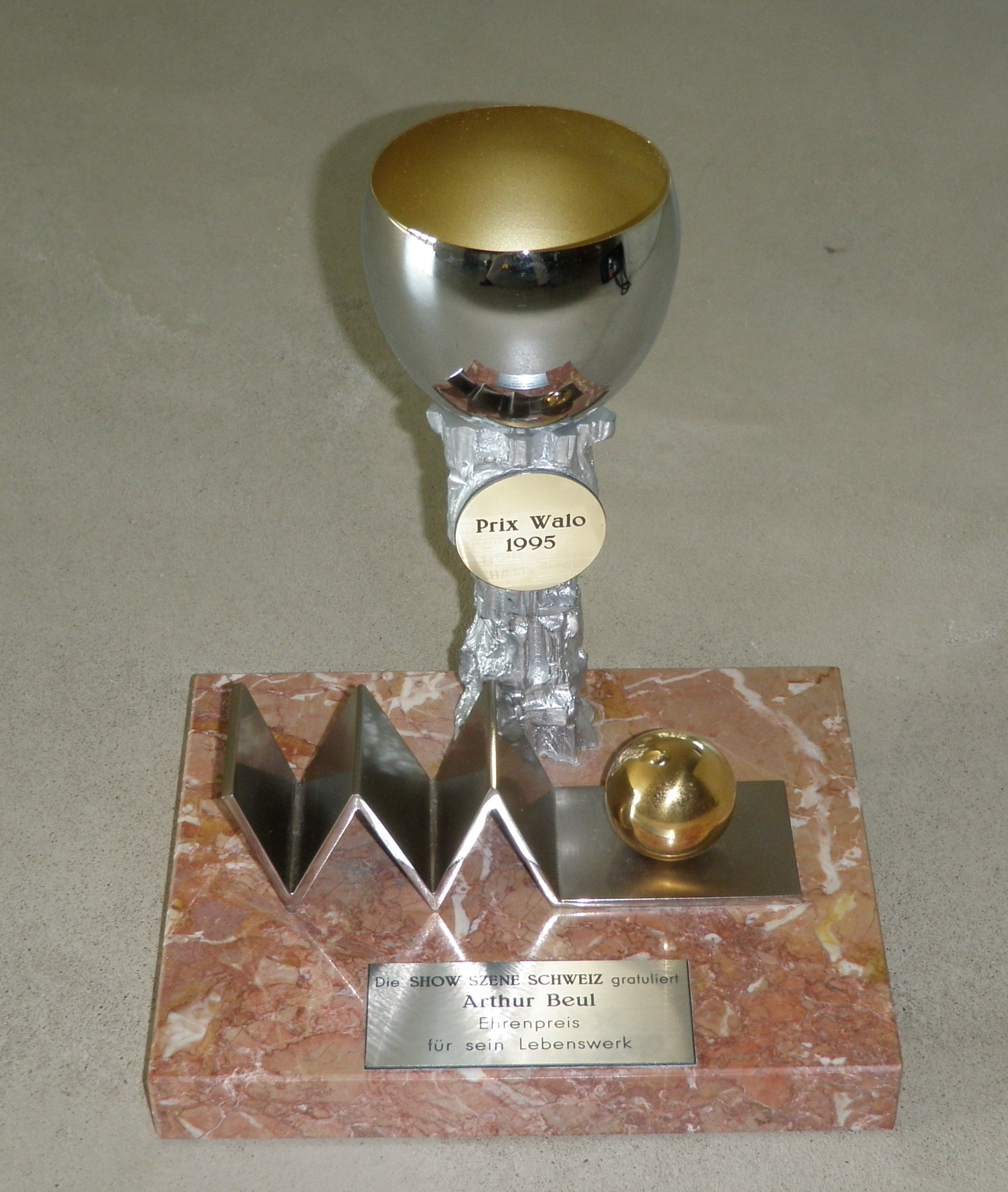
Prix Walo awarded to Artur Beul for his life's work, 1995

The Prix Walo is a Swiss award given for showbusiness.

== Awards since 1994 ==
=== Honorable - Walo - awards ===
- 1983: Charly Fritsche
- 1991: Eynar Grabowsky
- 1992: Willi Schmidt, First Harmonic Brass Band
- 1993: Caterina Valente, Ettore Cella
- 1994: Alfredo, Adolf Stähli
- 1995: Wysel Gyr, Vico Torriani, Artur Beul
- 1996: Anne-Marie Blanc
- 1997: ?
- 1998: Lilo Pulver, Hannes Schmidhauser
- 1999: Fredy Knie senior
- 2000: Dimitri
- 2001: Hazy Osterwald
- 2002: Walo Lüönd
- 2003: César Keiser und Margrit Läubli
- 2004: Conelli Conny Gasser, Herbi Lips und Urs Pfister
- 2005: Trudi Gerster
- 2006: Walter Roderer
- 2007: Lys Assia
- 2008: Nella Martinetti
- 2009: Elisabeth Schnell und Ueli Beck
- 2010: Hans Leutenegger
- 2013: Jörg Schneider

=== Award: public preferred artists ===
- 1974: Hazy Osterwald
- 1975: Hans Gmür und Karl Suter
- 1976: Peter, Sue & Marc
- 1977: Kurt Felix
- 1978: Ruedi Walter und Margrit Rainer
- 1979: Kliby und Caroline
- 1980: Pepe Lienhard
- 1981: Emil
- 1982: Beni Thurnheer
- 1983: Walter Roderer
- 1984: Beny Rehmann
- 1985: Cabaret Rotstift
- 1986: Ruedi Walter
- 1987: Ursula Schaeppi und Walter Andreas Müller
- 1988: Walter Roderer
- 1989: Furbaz
- 1990: Peter Reber
- 1991: Vreni und Rudi
- 1992: Marcocello
- 1993: Peach Weber
- 1994: Birgit Steinegger
- 1995: Fascht e Familie
- 1996: DJ Bobo
- 1997: Schmirinskis
- 1998: Gölä und Band
- 1999: Francine Jordi
- 2000: Francine Jordi
- 2001: Schmirinskis
- 2002: Francine Jordi und Florian Ast
- 2003: Sven Epiney
- 2004: Roman Kilchsperger
- 2005: Francine Jordi
- 2006: Stephanie Glaser
- 2007: Jodlerklub Wiesenberg
- 2008: Oesch’s die Dritten
- 2009: Cabaret Divertimento
- 2010: Monique
- 2011: Patricia Boser
- 2012: Luca Hänni
- 2013: Furbaz
- 2014: Cabaret Divertimento
- 2015: Sabine Dahinden
- 2016: Viola Tami
- 2017: Stefan Gubser
- 2018: Kurt Aeschbacher

=== Comedy/cabaret ===
- 1994: Acapickels
- 1995: Geschwister Pfister
- 1996: Massimo Rocchi
- 1997: Duo Fischbach
- 1998: Marco Rima
- 1999: Ursus & Nadeschkin
- 2000: Flügzüg
- 2001: Mölä und Stahli
- 2002: Marco Rima
- 2003: Lorenz Keiser
- 2004: Andreas Thiel
- 2005: Marco Rima
- 2006: Cabaret Divertimento
- 2007: Bagatello
- 2008: Simon Enzler
- 2009: Cabaret Divertimento
- 2010: Claudio Zuccolini
- 2011: Michael Elsener
- 2012: Edelmais
- 2013: Divertimento
- 2014: Peach Weber
- 2015: Sutter & Pfändler
- 2016: Fabian Unteregger
- 2017: Helga Schneider
- 2018: Pattie Basler
- 2019: Renato Kaiser
- 2020: n/a
- 2021: n/a
- 2022: n/a
- 2023: Charles Nguela
- 2024: Claudio Zuccolini

=== Newcomer ===
- 1999: Subzonic
- 2000: Daniel Fohrler
- 2001: Susanne Kunz
- 2002: Plüsch
- 2003: Mia Aegerter
- 2004: Baschi
- 2005: Daniel Kandlbauer
- 2006: Cornelia Bösch
- 2007: Stefanie Heinzmann
- 2008: Sophie Hunger
- 2009: Lea Lu
- 2010: Steff la Cheffe
- 2011: Bastian Baker
- 2012: Luca Hänni
- 2013: Nicole Bernegger
- 2014: Ira May
- 2015: Kunz
- 2016: Georg Schlunegger
- 2017: Nemo
- 2018: Noëmie Schmidt
- 2019: Stubete Gäng
- 2020: n/a
- 2021: n/a
- 2022: n/a
- 2023: Joya Marleen
- 2024: Remo Forrer

=== Pop/Rock ===
- 1999: Gotthard
- 2000: Martin Schenkel
- 2004: Plüsch
- 2005: Adrian Stern
- 2006: Lovebugs
- 2007: Stephan Eicher
- 2008: Bligg
- 2009: Seven
- 2010: Adrian Stern
- 2011: 77 Bombay Street
- 2012: Gotthard
- 2013: Bastian Baker
- 2014: Pegasus
- 2015: Patent Ochsner
- 2016: Trauffer
- 2017: Kunz
- 2018: Lo & Leduc
- 2019: Hecht
- 2023 Pop/Rock Band: Patent Ochsner
- 2023 Pop/Rock Singer: Bastian Baker
- 2024: Züri West

=== Radio-, TV- and Filmproductions ===
- 1994: Pingu Film
- 1995: Fascht e Familie TV
- 1996: Katzendiebe Film
- 1997: Viktors Spätprogramm TV
- 1998: Apéro (SR DRS) Radio
- 1999: Benissimo TV
- 2000: Viktors Spätprogramm TV
- 2001: Total Birgit TV
- 2002: Aeschbacher with Kurt Aeschbacher TV, Marc Forster Film
- 2003: Lüthi und Blanc (soap opera) TV, Achtung, fertig, Charlie! Film
- 2004: Berg und Geist (3sat, [SF]) TV, 2004: Sternenberg Film
- 2005: Mein Name ist Eugen Film
- 2006: Glanz & Gloria TV, Die Herbstzeitlosen Film
- 2007: Die grössten Schweizer Hits TV, Chrigu Film
- 2008: Giacobbo/Müller TV, Auf der Strecke Film
- 2009: La Bohéme im Hochhaus TV, Die Standesbeamtin Film
- 2010: Kampf der Chöre TV, Sennentuntschi Film
- 2011: Der VerdingbubFilm, Happy Day TV
- 2012: Potzmusic SRF1, More Than Honey
- 2013: Die schwarzen Brüder, Der Bestatter SFR
- 2014: Der Goalie bin ig, Auf und davon SRF
- 2015: Schellen-Ursli, SRF bi de Lüt - Landfrauenküche
- 2016: Ma vie de Courgette, Gotthard SRF
- 2017: Die göttliche Ordnung, Wilder
- 2018: «Wolkenbruchs wunderliche Reise in die Arme einer Schickse», «Tatort: Die Musik stirbt zuletzt»
- 2019: Zwingli, Persönlich Radio SRF 1
- 2023: Die goldenen Jahre, Tschugger
- 2024: Bon Schuur Ticino, Davos 1917

=== Actors on TV and film ===
- 1994: Sue Matthys
- 1995: Jörg Schneider
- 1996: Mathias Gnädinger
- 1997: Inigo Gallo
- 1998: Bruno Ganz
- 1999: Christian Kohlund
- 2000: Erich Vock
- 2001: ?
- 2002: Walter Andreas Müller
- 2003: Esther Gemsch
- 2004: Bruno Ganz
- 2005: Mike Müller
- 2006: Stephanie Glaser
- 2007: Anatole Taubman
- 2008: Sabina Schneebeli
- 2009: Erich Vock
- 2010: Hanspeter Müller-Drossaart

=== Popular hits/ (folk music), popular Swiss country music ===
- 1994: Peter Reber
- 1995: Carlo Brunner
- 1996: Peter Zinsli
- 1997: Leonard
- 1998: Francine Jordi
- 1999: Francine Jordi
- 2000: Carlo Brunner
- 2000: ?
- 2002: Ruedi Rymann
- 2003: Streichmusik Alder
- 2004: Hans Aregger
- 2005: Carlo Brunner
- 2006: ChueLee
- 2007: Jodlerklub Wiesenberg
- 2008: Oesch’s die Dritten
- 2009: Yasmine-Mélanie
- 2010: Nicolas Senn

=== Other categories ===
In these categories the award is not given every year or is no longer awarded:

==== Artists (Clowns), (Circus) ====
- 1994: Louis Knie
- 1995: Dimitri
- 1996: Ursus & Nadeschkin
- 1998: Karls kühne Gassenschau

==== Country/Blues/Roots ====
- 1995: John Brack
- 2005: John Brack
- 2008: Philipp Fankhauser
- 2011: C.H. (Kisha, Reto Burrell, Rickenbacher)

==== Dance ====
- 2005: DJ Tatana

==== DJ/Hip Hop ====
- 2002: DJ Tatana
- 2009: Greis
- 2010: Bligg

==== International success ====
- 1995: DJ BoBo

==== Jazz/Gospel/Boogie-Woogie ====
- 1995: Bo Katzman

==== Writers for TV, TV-moderators ====
- 1994: Charles Lewinsky
- 1996: Viktor Giacobbo
- 1997: Beni Thurnheer

==== Music award ====
- 2001: Gotthard

==== Pop ====
- 1994: DJ BoBo
- 1995: Sina
- 1996: Florian Ast
- 1997: DJ BoBo
- 1998: Kisha
- 2002: Polo Hofer
- 2003: Lunik

==== Rock ====
- 1994: Züri West
- 1995: Polo Hofer
- 1996: Gotthard
- 1997: Gotthard
- 1998: Gölä
- 2003: Patent Ochsner

==== Popular hits / french "Chanson" ====
- 1994: Dodo Hug
- 1999: Toni Vescoli
- 2006: ChueLee

==== Cirkus, Theater and Musical ====
- 1994: Keep Cool
- 1995: Space Dream
- 1998: Circus Monti
- 2000: Circus Monti
- 2006: Karls kühne Gassenschau
- 2007: Ewigi Liebi
- 2008: -
- 2009: Die kleine Niederdorfoper
- 2010: Dällebach Kari

==== Special events ====
- 2010: Open Air Hoch-Ybrig
