= Lüönd =

Lüönd is a surname. Notable people with the surname include:

- Paul Lüönd (1950–2014), Swiss musician and politician
- Walo Lüönd (1927–2012), Swiss movie actor
