= Stupid Boy (disambiguation) =

"Stupid Boy" is a 2006 single by Keith Urban.

Stupid Boy may also refer to:

- Stupid Boy (film), a 2004 film by Lionel Baier
- "Stupid Boy", a song by the Gear Daddies from Billy's Live Bait
- "Stupid Boy", a song by T. Mills
- "Stupid Boy", a song by Ronnie Radke from the 2014 mixtape Watch Me
