= Die Herbstzeitlosen =

Die Herbstzeitlosen (German Meadow saffron) may refer to:

- Used People, American film directed by Beeban Kidron
- Late Bloomers (2006 film), 2006 Swiss film directed by Bettina Oberli
