= Das Traumhotel =

- Starring: Christian Kohlund
- Country of origin: Germany

Das Traumhotel is a German/Austrian television series.

== See also ==
- List of German television series
