= Bread and Stones =

- Directed by: Mark M. Rissi
- Written by: Walther Kauer; Mark M. Rissi
- Starring: Liselotte Pulver; Hans Rhyn; Beatrice Kessler
- Cinematography: Edwin Horak
- Music by: Martin Böttcher; Véronique Müller; Eugster Trio
- Production company: Logos-Film
- Release date: 1979
- Running time: 89 minutes
- Country: Switzerland
- Language: Swiss German

Bread and Stones (German: Brot und Steine) is a 1979 Swiss drama film directed by Mark M. Rissi and starring Liselotte Pulver, Hans Rhyn and Beatrice Kessler.

== Cast ==
- Liselotte Pulver as Bodenbauers Mutter
- Hans Rhyn as Widimattbauern Hans
- Beatrice Kessler as Ursula
- Walo Lüönd as Bodenbauer
- Sigfrit Steiner as Tierarzt

== Bibliography ==
- Goble, Alan. The Complete Index to Literary Sources in Film. Walter de Gruyter, 1999.
