= Marco Rima =

Swiss actor, comedian, cabaret artist and producer

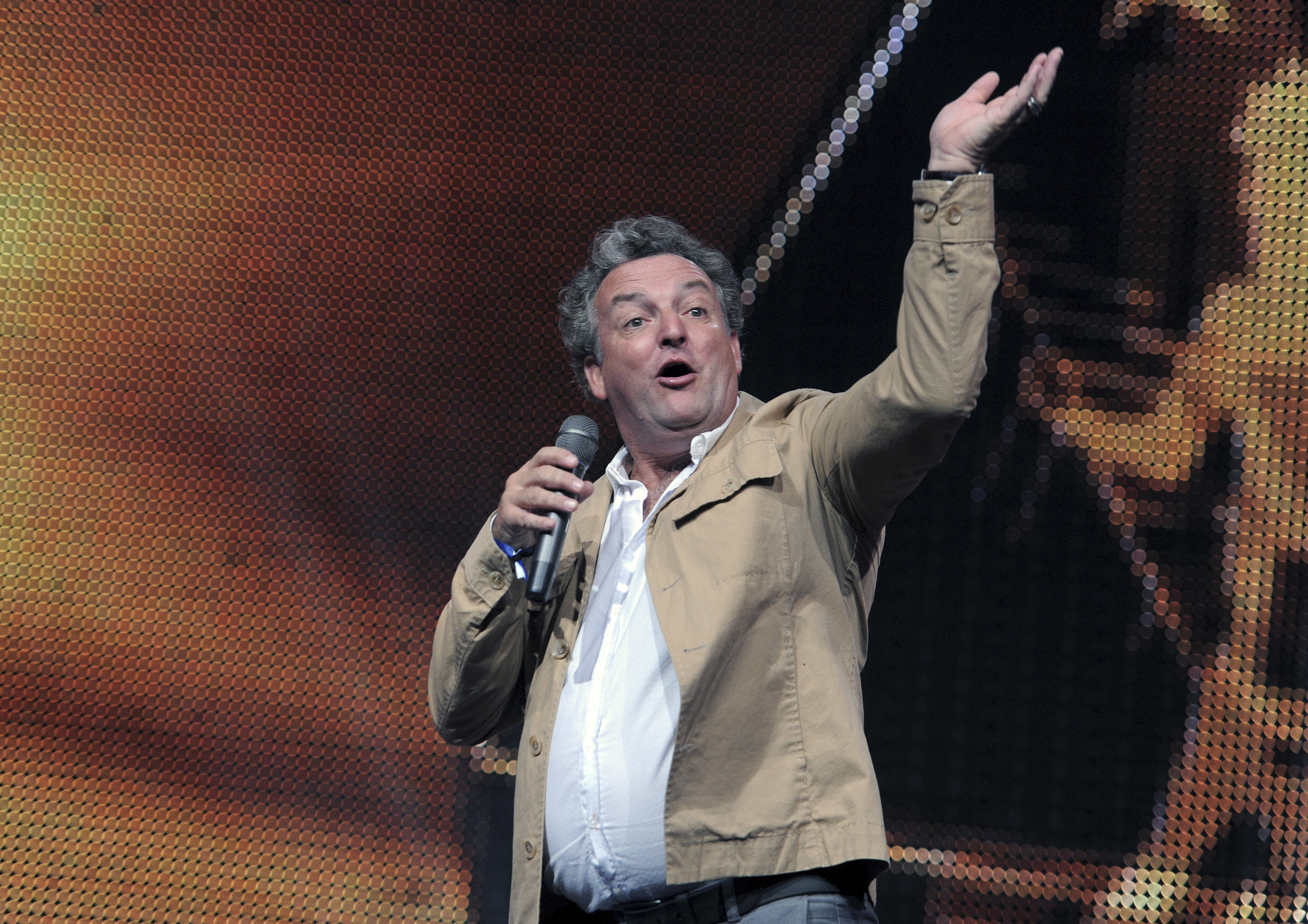
Marco Rima at 12. Internationale Sportnacht Davos 2014

Marco Rima (born April 7, 1961 in Winterthur, Switzerland) is a Swiss actor, comedian, cabaret artist and producer. He grew up in the canton of Zug and studied elementary school teaching. He now lives in Oberägeri, canton of Zug.

== Career ==
In 1983 Rima and Marcello Weber founded the cabaret-duo Marcocello. In 1992 Marcocello received a platinum record for their programme Juhubilé. Then in 1993 the duo split up. He now works as a solo artist.

In 1992 Rima wrote and produced the comedy musical Keep cool, in which he played the lead role. Approximately 500.000 visitors went to see the show in Switzerland and Germany until 1996.

From 1996 Rima participated in the Wochenshow, with which he also became known in Germany. Especially the characters Opa Adolf, Frey und Horst Lemminger he portrayed, gained a lot of popularity. After three years, in 1999, Rima left the Wochenshow to focus on other projects.

Rima produced the comedy musical Hank Hoover, which was performed from 1998 to 2001. Over 170.000 visitors saw the show in Switzerland and Germany. Various solo-shows followed form the years 2002 to 2013, among these were Think Positive and Humor Sapiens. In 2010 Rima performed on the multimedial comedy musical Die Patienten. Furthermore, Rima was involved in the production of the movies Achtung, fertig, Charlie , Handyman and Liebling lass uns scheiden (with Esther Schweins and Mark Keller).

After a longer break, Rima was back on German television on Sat.1 with Die Marco Rima Show in spring 2008.

Rima has received the Prix Walo five times: in 1993 as the most popular entertainer, in 1994 in theater/musical category, and in 1999, 2003 and 2005 as the most popular entertainer in the cabaret and comedy category. Rima also performs regularly at the Arosa Humor Festival, for example at the first edition in 1992 with Cabaret Marcocello, as well as in 2010 and 2011, most recently as host of the TV recordings.

Since 2021, he has had a weekly video format Rima-Spalter on the Nebelspalter.

Rima performs character comedy, parodies, physical comedy, sketch comedy and integrates word plays in his work.

=== COVID-19 pandemic ===
In the wake of the COVID-19 pandemic, Rima expressed criticism of the measures taken against the pandemic in Switzerland. In September 2020, he appeared at a demonstration of "Corona skeptics" in Zurich. He is a member of the committee of an initiative that collects signatures against compulsory vaccination. By his own account, he lost several sponsors, including the children's charity UNICEF Switzerland and Liechtenstein, for which he had collected donations for 20 years.

In his weekly video format Rima Spalter on YouTube he expressed his attitude humorously towards the measurements in various videos showing his skepticism. Rima portrayed the Swiss Federal Council of Health Alain Berset in a parody. With this parody he encouraged people to vote against a referendum on the tightening of the Covid laws in Switzerland.

== Filmography ==
=== TV shows ===
- 1996: Die Wochenshow
- 1998: Varell & Decker
- 1998: Menschen
- 1999: Wir vom Revier
- 2000: Max & Lisa
- 2008: Die Marco Rima Show
- 2018: Ich nehm’ dann mal ab – Marco Rima tritt in die Pedale

=== Movies ===
- 1998: Der Kinderhasser
- 1999: Monty Python's wunderbare Welt des Schwachsinns
- 2001: Sind denn alle netten Männer schwul
- 2001: Ein Millionär zum Frühstück
- 2002: Drei Frauen, ein Plan und die ganz große Kohle
- 2003: Zwei Väter einer Tochter
- 2003: Strategy of Seduction
- 2003: Achtung, fertig, Charlie!
- 2004: Frechheit siegt
- 2005: Gefühl ist alles
- 2006: Handyman
- 2009: Champions – Es ist nie zu spät für ein Comeback
- 2010: Liebling, lass uns scheiden
- 2013: Achtung, fertig, WK!

== Stage programs ==
- 1992: Keep Cool (comedy musical)
- 1998–2001: Hank Hoover (comedy musical)
- 2002: Think Positive
- 2007: No Limits
- 2010: Time Out
- 2011: Die Patienten (comedy musical)
- 2012: Humor Sapiens
- 2015: Made in Hellwitzia
- 2018: Just for Fun!

== Publications ==
- Lotti, Otti & Mocke (three-part radio play series)
- 1991: Cabaret Marcocello: Juhubilé
- various CDs und DVDs to all "Rima" musicals und stage programs

== Literature ==
- Stefan Koslowski, Tanja Stenzl: Marco Rima. In: Andreas Kotte (publisher.): Theaterlexikon der Schweiz. volume 3, Chronos, Zürich 2005, ISBN 3-0340-0715-9, S. 1498.
