= Papa Moll =

Papa Moll is a comic work of children's fiction published in 1952 by Swiss author Edith Oppenheim-Jonas. It is a novel about the events in the life of a father and his family in Switzerland.

Papa Moll is created by Edith Oppenheim-Jonas, in 1952. Edith Oppenheim-Jonas mentioned to Swiss Radio Schweizer Radio DRS that she was inspired by her own family when writing the stories of Papa Moll. Edith Oppenheim-Jonas died in 2001 at the age of 93.

== The Story ==
Papa Moll is the main character in the comic. He is a family father with a bald head and a big belly. He usually wears a tie and a jacket. His wife called Mama Moll and their three children: Willy, Fritz and Evi. The sixth member of the family is Tschips, a dachshund. Moll is a charming, clumsy, kind father and husband. Due to his traits, he gets into adventures and troubles. By which his family always accompany him through these amusements. The book Father and Son (comics) written in 1934 by the German author Erich Ohser, was first published in the Berliner Illustrirten Zeitung. The two stories share many similarities in plot line and imagery.

== Second use ==
Translations into French were tried, but were not published due to translation difficulties. In 2012, all books were published in Chinese.

Some of the Papa Moll books are also available as audiobooks. Kamil Krejčí, a Czech-Swiss actor, rewrote the audio books, directed and voiced Papa Moll. Other roles are played by Brigitte Schmidlin (Mama Moll), Beat Gärtner (Tschips, as well as all the animals and guest roles), Gabriela Leutwiler (Evi Moll), Ralph Vogt/Reto Mosimann/Peter Hottinger (Fritz Moll) and Peter Steiner (Willy Moll). The music for the radio plays was composed by Alexius Tschallener.

After several unsuccessful attempts, in the summer of 2016 the Papa Moll story was adapted as a feature film, titled Papa Moll and the abduction of the flying dog (Papa Moll und die Entführung des fliegenden Hundes). The English title was Adventures at the Chocolate Factory or Mr. Moll and the Chocolate Factory. Based on the original, a complete cinema plot was developed, and the story was expanded to include additional characters: Papa Moll works in a chocolate factory and his ambitious supervisor (Herr Stuss) makes life hard. The main role is played by Swiss actor Stefan Kurt. The film was directed by Manuel Flurin Hendry and produced by Zodiac Pictures. The premiere took place on 2 December 2017 in Baden, and the Swiss theatrical release was on 21 December 2017 .
