= Der grosse Sommer =

Swiss-German language comedy film

Der Grosse Sommer
- Mathias Gnädinger and Loïc Sho Güntensperger on the film poster for the Swiss cinemas
- Directed by: Stefan Jäger
- Written by: Theo Plakoudakis; Marco Salituro
- Produced by: Katrin Renz
- Starring: Mathias Gnädinger; Loïc Sho Güntensperger
- Cinematography: Knut Schmitz
- Edited by: Robin Wenger
- Music by: Angelo Berardi
- Distributed by: Impuls Pictures AG
- Release date: 28 January 2016
- Running time: 100 minutes
- Countries: Switzerland; Japan
- Language: Swiss German

Der grosse Sommer (English: The great Sommer) is a Swiss-German language comedy film that was released in Switzerland on 28 January 2016. Produced partly in Japan, it is the last film to star Mathias Gnädinger.

The title of the film refers to the German surname Sommer, and to the German word for "summer". The term gross (meaning "tall") refers to the protagonist's stature, and also to "great".

== Cast ==
- Mathias Gnädinger as Anton Sommer
- Gilles Schyvens-Gnädinger, as young Sommer
- Loïc Sho Güntensperger, as Hiro Akima
- Reto Stalder, as Hofer
- Monica Gubser
- Sonja Riesen
- Hanspeter Müller-Drossaart
- Mitsuko Baisho
- Tomio Suga

== Plot ==
Anton Sommer (Mathias Gnädinger) is retired and lives quietly in the countryside. Once a popular Swiss wrestler, Sommer now tinkers with his bottle ships and wants to be left alone. However, Hiro (Loïc Sho Güntensperger) does not respect Sommer's wish to live a seclusive life. When Hiro's grandmother, the owner of Sommer's apartment, unexpectedly dies, the boy asks Sommer to accompany him to the south of Japan where Hiro intends to attend a school for Sumo wrestlers. Sommer does not plan to fulfill Hiro's wish, as he is done with his past. But the little boy is just as stubborn as Sommer; after Hiro to terminate his lease, the old man agrees to go with him. Sommer leaves Switzerland for the first time in his life and the two travel to Japan and start to develop a strong friendship.

== Production ==
Mathias Gnädinger on the promotional film poster during the production

The film's production in Japan was documented by 10vor10. Gnädiger was fascinated by the old Japanese traditions and his ten-year-old co-star Loïc Sho of Swiss-Japanese ancestry. Gnädinger was told to get in touch with the Swiss wrestling (Schwingen) just one time as a boy. Ursula Gnädinger assisted her husband on the production as make-up artist. Gnädinger's son, Gilles, played Sommer as a young man.

Following the completion of filming in Switzerland and Japan in autumn 2014, Mathias Gnädinger died on 3 April 2015. While post production work had not yet finished, Tellfilm decided to move up the film's release from 2016 to (late) summer 2015. After being delayed for several months, the film was released in Switzerland on 28 January 2016. The script was based on two intense research trips to Japan. The film's production was supported by the Swiss Federal Office of Culture, the Zürich Film Foundation and the Migros Kulturprozent.

== Festivals ==
- 2016: Solothurner Filmtage, Solothurn, Switzerland.

== Release ==
The Swiss comedy premiered on 14 December 2015 in Tokyo, on 23 January at the 2016 Solothurn Film Festival in Europe, and started in the Swiss cinemas on 28 January 2016.

== Home media ==
The film was released under the title Der grosse Sommer on DVD (RC2) on 25 August 2016. The home release includes language versions in German and Swiss German, with subtitles in English, French, Italian, Japanese and German.
