= Welcome to Switzerland =

2004 film

- Film poster
- Bienvenue en Suisse
- Directed by: Léa Fazer
- Written by: Léa Fazer
- Produced by: Hélène Delale; Bruno Pésery; Ruth Waldburger
- Starring: Vincent Perez; Emmanuelle Devos; Denis Podalydès
- Cinematography: Myriam Vinocour
- Edited by: Hervé de Luze; Élise Fiévet
- Music by: Laurent Levesque; Loïk Dury
- Distributed by: Pathé
- Release dates: 13 May 2004 (Cannes); 30 June 2004 (France)
- Running time: 105 minutes
- Countries: France; Switzerland
- Language: French
- Budget: € 5.3 million

Welcome to Switzerland (French: Bienvenue en Suisse) is a 2004 French-Swiss comedy film directed by Léa Fazer. It was screened in the Un Certain Regard section at the 2004 Cannes Film Festival.

== Cast ==
- Vincent Perez as Aloïs Couchepin
- Emmanuelle Devos as Sophie
- Denis Podalydès as Thierry
- Walo Lüönd as Adolf Sempach
- Marianne Basler as Béatrice
