= The Foster Boy =

- Film poster
- German: Der Verdingbub
- Directed by: Markus Imboden
- Starring: Katja Riemann; Stefan Kurt
- Release date: 3 November 2011
- Running time: 107 minutes
- Country: Switzerland
- Language: Swiss German

The Foster Boy (German: Der Verdingbub) is a 2011 Swiss drama film directed by Markus Imboden. It dramatizes the fate of two Verdingkinder in Emmental.

== Plot ==
Max is an orphan whose one true passion is to play the accordion. He is sent to the Bosigers farm where he meets Berteli who is also with the Bosigers as a foster child. Even though they are cared for by being fed and sent to school, Max and Berteli are treated like servants. Berteli is upset at being separated from her mother and at first Mrs Bosiger shows tenderness towards her by giving her chocolate when she cries at the dinner table. Max is indifferent towards Berteli in the beginning but later on develops a genuine affection towards her. Max has a pet rabbit which he loves and Berteli innocently tells Jakob, the Bosigers son, about it, who cruelly kills the rabbit and brings the meat for Mrs Bosiger to cook. When he reveals at the table that it was Max's rabbit that he brought, Max rushes outside disgusted and vomits, repulsed over eating his own rabbit.

At school, Max and Berteli's teacher, Miss. Sigrist, take a special interest in Max and encourages him to play his accordion for Schwingen Day. The family enjoy the evening out during which Jakob makes sexual advances on Miss Sigrist, causing Max to intervene and beat up Jakob. Jakob takes his revenge on Max by burning his accordion. Life gets more unbearable for Berteli when Jakob visits her room every night to rape her. Berteli tries to return to her mother, who is unable to look after her but still begs the man she's living with to keep Berteli with her. He refuses and Berteli, sensing her mother's dilemma, voluntarily leaves and says that she will go back to the Bosigers and that she came to see her because she was homesick. Unable to bear what is happening to them both, Max suggests that they should run away to Argentina where he can become a professional musician. Miss Sigrist tries to intervene and goes to the authorities to expose the abuse Max and Berteli are suffering. Berteli becomes pregnant, and one day a horrified Max sees Jakob going to Berteli's room and confides in Miss Sigrist. Miss Sigrist visits the farm and tells Mrs. Bosiger that Jakob has been having sex with Berteli, upon which Mrs Bosiger becomes furious and throws her out. Miss Sigrist angrily tells Mrs Bosiger that it is her responsibility to care for these two children and not ignore what has been happening to Berteli. Miss Sigrist who has now lost her job because she tried to help Max and Berteli, leaves after giving Max a brand new accordion. Mrs. Bosiger sees Berteli vomiting and asks her why she is sick to which replies that it is because of what Jakob does to her at night. Mrs. Bosiger gets angry and forces Berteli to say that she is lying, but does confront Jakob who doesn't admit or deny anything. Mrs. Bosiger makes Berteli drink a bottle of castor oil as part of a home remedy abortion, and at night Berteli's screams are heard by Max as she starts aborting the baby. A heavily intoxicated Mr. Bosiger prevents Max from going to Berteli and forces him to play his accordion to hide her screams. Max visits Berteli after her contractions stop and Mrs. Bosiger is seen changing the blood stained sheets. The two plan to run away to Argentina as soon as Berteli becomes better, but she dies and it is unclear whether she has committed suicide or succumbed to infection. The authorities investigate and Mrs Bosiger and Jakob claim that Berteli's death was a suicide. When the Reverend starts to pray before taking Berteli's body away, Max comes shouting the truth about Berteli's death. Mr. Bosiger shows the authorities the bottle of castor oil that Mrs Bosigner forced Berteli to drink. The authorities are now aware of the abuse foster children suffer and plan to investigate further.

Max runs away to Argentina and gets onto a ship where he works and plays his accordion to make a living. Although he is sad about Berteli's passing, he narrates as though he is speaking to her about how much he earns, his work, the food and how he is no longer beaten. He says that he will continue to communicate through his music with Berteli who is in heaven with her father and Max's rabbit. The final scene shows Max, now an old man, playing his accordion to an audience showing that he reached Argentina and became the musician he always dreamed of.

== Cast ==
- Katja Riemann - Bösigerin
- Stefan Kurt - Bösiger
- Max Simonischek - Jakob
- Max Hubacher - Max
- Lisa Brand - Berteli
- Miriam Stein - Esther Sigrist (teacher)
- Andreas Matti - Hasslinger
- Heidy Forster - Grossmutter
- Ursina Lardi - Mutter Dürrer
- Ernst C. Sigrist - Polizist
- Christoph Gaugler - Störmetzger
