= Stephanie Glaser =

Swiss actress (1920–2011)

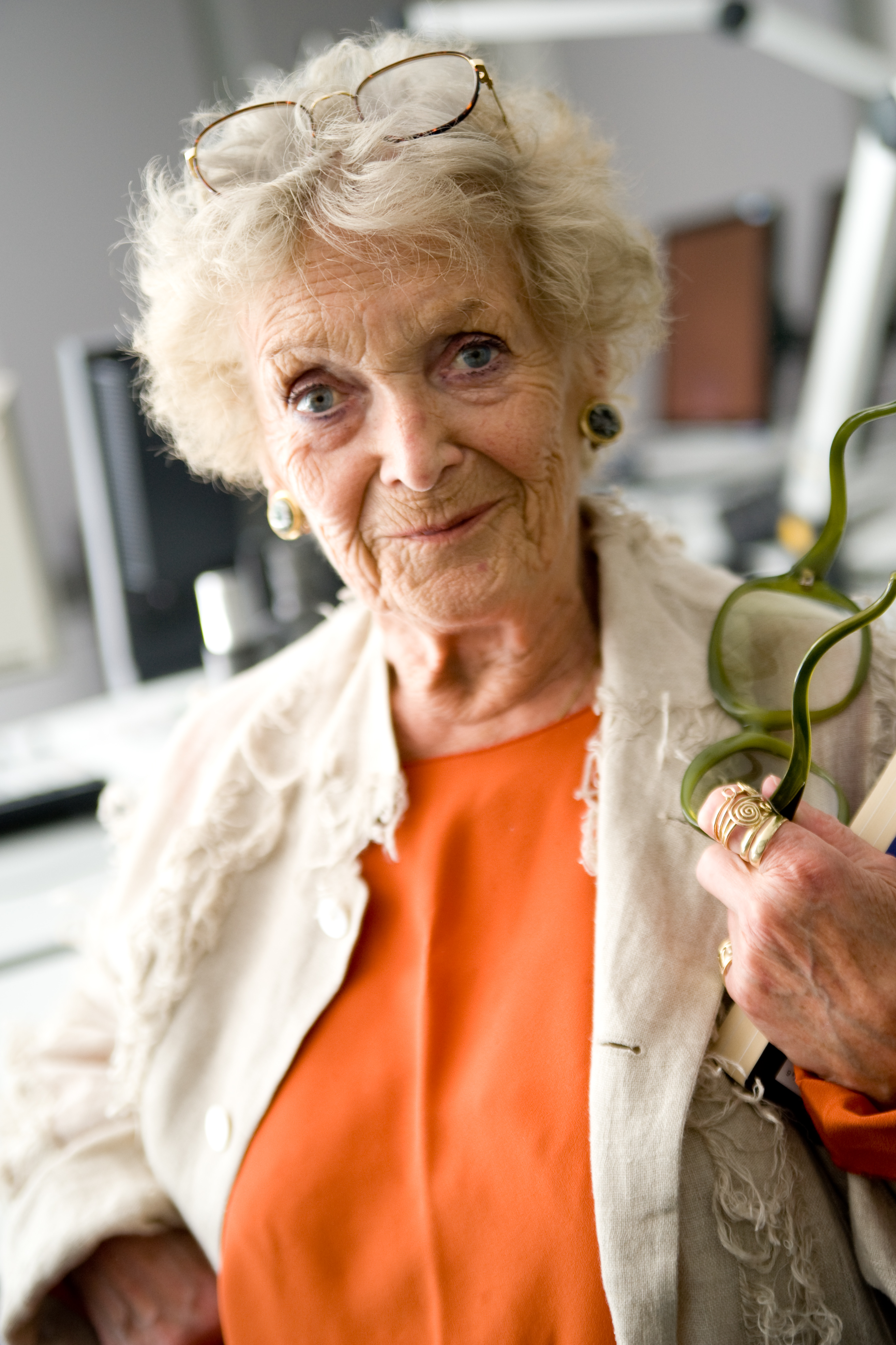
- Stephanie Glaser in 2009
- Born: Stephanie Glaser; 22 February 1920; Neuchâtel, Switzerland
- Died: 14 January 2011 (aged 90); Zollikon, Switzerland
- Occupations: Actor; cabaret artist
- Years active: 1954-2011
- Spouse: Oscar Düby (m. 1954; died 1982)

Stephanie Glaser (22 February 1920 – 14 January 2011) was one of Switzerland's most prominent stage, TV and film actresses, popular for her portrayal of down-to-earth, sympathetic characters.

== Early life and education ==
Glaser was born 22 February 1920 in Neuchâtel, Switzerland to Willy Albert Glaser (1891–1949), a hotelier and restaurateur, and Alice Glaser (née Aeberli), originally from Schaffhausen. Her father operated several hotels during his career most notably the Hotel Terminus in Spiez and the Hotel de la Poste in Bern. Her mother was the first woman in Bern to drive an automobile and she formed a women's automobile club.

Her paternal family immigrated to Switzerland from Germany in the 1840s and became citizens of Niederhünigen in 1855. Her paternal grandfather, Dr. Georg Glaser–Schmid, a psychiatrist was the general director of the Psychiatric Hospital in Münsterlingen.

After some time in England and at finishing school, she studied acting at the Reinhardt-Seminar in Vienna.

== Career ==
Glaser then performed at various theatres in Switzerland and Germany. She was a member of the Bäretatze, Floigefänger and Fédéral comedy troupes, and became, alongside Walter Roderer, one of Switzerland's noted popular actresses as well as a leading figure of the 1950s Swiss comedy scene.

She became known to the general public for her roles in the Gotthelf film adaptations Uli der Knecht and Ueli, der Pächter, and notably for starring as "Aunt Elise" in the TV show Teleboy by Kurt Felix between 1974 and 1981. Later she was also cast in the TV series Motel and Die Direktorin.

A great success was "Stan und Ollie in der Schweiz", starring Ursula Schaeppi as Stan and Glaser as Ollie in 1987.

In the 1980s she returned to film work and in 2006, at the age of 86, she was cast in her first title role in the critically and commercially successful movie Late Bloomers (Die Herbstzeitlosen). Stephanie Glaser continued working as an actress in her old age. A few months before she died on 14 January 2011, aged 90, she had been shooting scenes for the TV movie Mord hinterm Vorhang.

== Personal life ==
In 1954, Glaser married Oscar Düby (1904-1982), who was a movie producer. They did not have children, something that Glaser regretted later in life.

== Selected filmography ==
- 1954: Uli der Knecht – Trinette
- 1955: Ueli der Pächter – Trinette
- 1955: Polizischt Wäckerli
- 1957: Taxichauffeur Bänz – Lilly
- 1984: Motel (TV show)
- 1988: Klassezämekunft – Lisbeth Schneider
- 1989: Leo Sonnyboy – Mother of Leo
- 1990: Der Tod zu Basel – Ms. Steiner
- 1994: Die Direktorin (TV show)
- 1998: Fascht e Familie (1 episode)
- 2000: Komiker – Mother Beck
- 2001: Spital in Angst – Patient
- 2001: Birdseye – Maya Vogelaug
- 2004: Sternenberg – Old Lady
- 2005: Mein Name ist Eugen – Aunt Melanie
- 2006: Late Bloomers – Martha Jost
- 2007: Wen der Berg ruft
- 2008: Hunkeler und der Fall Livius (TV movie)
- 2009: Das Fräuleinwunder – Frida Borel
- 2010: Mord hinterm Vorhang – Lydia Walliser

== Awards ==
- 2006: Special Leopard of the Locarno International Film Festival for Late Bloomers
- 2006: SwissAward in the culture category for Late Bloomers
- 2006: Prix Walo

== Bibliography ==
- «Stephanie Glaser». In: Susanna Schwager. Das volle Leben: Frauen über achtzig erzählen. Wörterseh Verlag, Gockhausen b. Zürich, 2007, p. 45–67.
