= Embers (1983 film) =

1983 film by Thomas Koerfer

- Directed by: Thomas Koerfer
- Written by: Thomas Koerfer; Dieter Feldhausen
- Starring: Armin Mueller-Stahl; Katharina Thalbach
- Cinematography: Frank Brühne
- Edited by: Georg Janett
- Music by: Peer Raben
- Release date: 1983
- Language: German

Embers (German: Glut) is a 1983 Swiss-West German drama film co-written and directed by Thomas Koerfer. The film was entered into the main competition at the 40th edition of the Venice Film Festival.

== Cast ==
- Armin Mueller-Stahl as François Korb / Andres Korb
- Katharina Thalbach as Claire Korb
- Matthias Habich as Albert Korb
- Krystyna Janda as Anna
- Sigfrit Steiner as Obert Wettach
- Thomas Lücking as Andres
- Agnes Zielinski as Anna
- Barbara Freier as Antonia
