= Lionel Baier =

Swiss film director

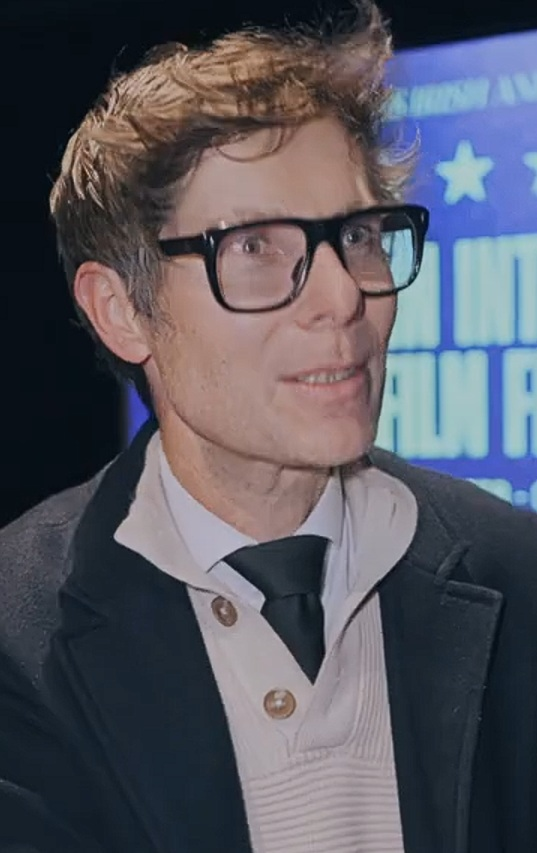
- Baier at DIFF 2026
- Born: 13 December 1975 (age 50); Lausanne, Switzerland
- Occupation: Film director
- Years active: 2003–present

Lionel Baier (born 13 December 1975 in Lausanne) is a Swiss film director.

== Career ==
Lionel Baier studied Art at University of Lausanne from 1995–98. In 2009, he co-founds the production company Bande à Part films, together with Ursula Meier, Jean-Stéphane Bron and Frédéric Mermoud.

Several of his films have been nominated for or awarded with the Swiss Film Award: Émile de 1 à 5 was nominated in the Best Short Film category in 2012, Comme des voleurs was nominated for Best Feature Film in 2007, as was Longwave (Les grandes Ondes (à L'ouest)) in 2014 and Vanity (La vanité) in 2016; the latter two were also nominated for the Best Screenplay award, which Baier co-wrote with Julien Boussioux. For their performance in Vanity, actor Patrick Lapp was awarded the prize for best male lead, as well as Ivan Georgiev for best supporting actor.

His films have been screened at various prestigious festivals: Vanity premiered at the 2015 Cannes Film Festival in the ACID section, and later screened in the Piazza Grande at the Locarno Film Festival. In 2018, Shock Waves: First Name: Mathieu (Ondes de choc – Prénom: Mathieu) was released, as part of the loose TV crime series Shock Waves (Ondes de choc), based on true stories. The film premiered at the Berlinale in 2018.

His latest feature film, Continental Drift (South) (La dérive des continents (au Sud)), has premiere in the Director's Fortnight section at Cannes in 2022.

Besides his work as a director and screenwriter, he teaches at École cantonale d'art de Lausanne (ÉCAL) in Lausanne, which's film department he chaired from 2002–21.

== Filmography (selection) ==
- 2000: Celui au pasteur
- 2002: La Parade (notre histoire)
- 2004: Stupid Boy (Garçon stupide)
- 2006: Comme des voleurs
- 2008: Un autre homme
- 2011: La faute à Rousseau (co-directed)
- 2012: Émile de 1 à 5 (short film)
- 2013: Longwave (Les grandes ondes (à l'Ouest))
- 2015: Vanity (La vanité)
- 2018: Shock Waves: First Name: Mathieu (Ondes de choc – Prénom: Mathieu)
- 2022: Continental Drift (South) (La dérive des continents (au Sud))
- 2025: The Safe House, In competition at the 75th Berlin International Film Festival

== Theatre ==
Director

- 2022: : Foucault en Californie, based on the book by Simeon Wade, Théâtre de Vidy, Lausanne.
