= List of Swiss films of 2014 =

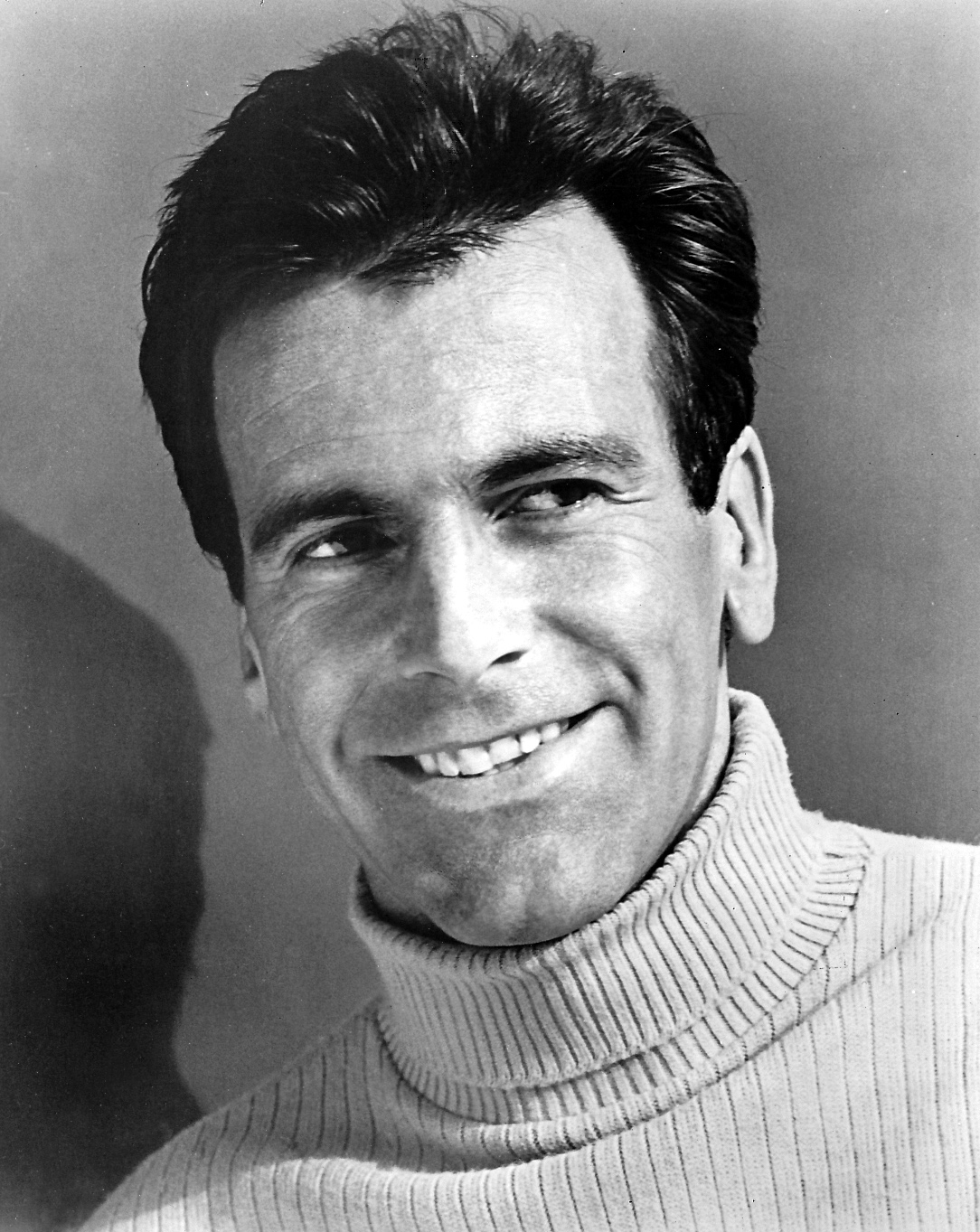
2014 saw the death of Maximilian Schell.

The Swiss film industry produced over two hundred feature films in 2014. This article fully lists all non-pornographic films, including short films, that had a release date in that year and which were at least partly made by Switzerland. It does not include films first released in previous years that had release dates in 2014.

== Major releases ==
Opening		Title	Cast and crew	Studio	Genre(s)	Ref.
F E B R U A R Y	8	Beloved Sisters	Director: Dominik Graf; Cast: Hannah Herzsprung, Florian Stetter, Henriette Confurius		Biography	
F E B R U A R Y	9	Superegos	Director: Benjamin Heisenberg; Cast: André Wilms		Drama	
A P R I L	5	The Ninth Cloud	Director: Jane Spencer; Cast: Michael Madsen, Jean-Hugues Anglade, Meredith Ostrom, Megan Maczko, Joshua Feinman, Wendy Thomas, Leo Gregory		Comedy; Drama	
M A Y	14	Grace of Monaco	Director: Olivier Dahan; Cast: Nicole Kidman, Tim Roth, Frank Langella, Parker Posey, Milo Ventimiglia, Derek Jacobi, Paz Vega	The Weinstein Company	Biography; Drama	
M A Y	18	The Wonders	Director: Alice Rohrwacher; Cast: Alba Rohrwacher, André Hennicke, Monica Bellucci		Drama	
M A Y	21	Goodbye to Language	Director: Jean-Luc Godard; Cast: Héloïse Godet, Kamel Abdeli, Richard Chevallier, Zoé Bruneau	Wild Bunch	Experimental	
M A Y	22	Bridges of Sarajevo	Directors: Aida Begić, Leonardo Di Constanzo, Jean-Luc Godard, Kamen Kalev, Isild Le Besco, Sergei Loznitsa, Vincenzo Marra, Ursula Meier, Vladimir Perišić, Cristi Puiu, Marc Recha, Angela Schanelec, Teresa Villaverde		Documentary	
M A Y	23	Clouds of Sils Maria	Director: Olivier Assayas; Cast: Juliette Binoche, Kristen Stewart, Chloë Grace Moretz	Les Films du Losange	Drama	
A U G U S T	14	Pause	Director: Mathieu Urfer; Cast: Baptiste Gilliéron		Comedy	
A U G U S T	28	The Price of Fame	Director: Xavier Beauvois; Cast: Benoît Poelvoorde, Roschdy Zem, Séli Gmach, Chiara Mastroianni, Nadine Labaki, Peter Coyote	Mars Distribution	Comedy; Drama	
S E P T E M B E R	18	The Circle	Director: Stefan Haupt; Cast: Matthias Hungerbühler, Sven Schelker, Marianne Sägebrecht, Anatole Taubman		Docudrama	
S E P T E M B E R	21	War	Director: Simon Jaquemet; Cast: Sascha Gisler		Drama	
O C T O B E R	9	Northmen: A Viking Saga	Director: Claudio Fäh; Cast: Tom Hopper, Ryan Kwanten, Ken Duken, Charlie Murphy, Ed Skrein, Anatole Taubman, Leo Gregory, James Norton, Darrell D'Silva, Johan Hegg, Danny Keogh	The Salt Company	Historical; Action	

== Minor releases ==
Title	Director	Release date	Genre
20 Regeln für Sylvie	Giacun Caduff	18 September 2014 (Switzerland)	Comedy
Anuk 2: The Fire Mountain	Luke Gasser	10 July 2014 (Switzerland)	Action
Au Bord Du Leman	Roni Can Vesar		Drama
Carl Lutz	Daniel von Aarburg	25 April 2014 (Switzerland)	Biography
Chubby	Bruno Deville	5 November 2014 (France)	Comedy
Confusion	Laurent Nègre		Thriller
Cure: The Life of Another	Andrea Staka	August 2014 (Switzerland)	Drama
Dawn	Romed Wyder	1 March 2014 (Switzerland)	Drama
Der letzte Mentsch	Pierre-Henry Salfati	8 May 2014 (Germany)	Drama
Der Schmetterlingsjäger	Harald Bergmann	17 July 2014 (Germany)	Drama
Deux jours avec mon père	Anne Gonthier		Drama
Devo Parlarti!	Carlo Sortino	21 February 2015 (Italy)	Comedy
Die weisse Lilie	David Borter		Drama
Dog Men	Dario Bischofberger		Science Fiction
Final Draw for Canada 2015	Eva Avila	6 December 2014 (Canada)	Sport
Fuori Mira	Erik Bernasconi	30 October 2014 (Switzerland)	Drama
Grüningers Fall	Alain Gsponer	31 January 2014 (Austria)	Drama
Homo Faber (Trois Femmes)	Richard Dindo	14 August 2014 (Switzerland)	Drama
I Am the Keeper	Sabine Boss	6 February 2014 (Switzerland)	Drama
Komm Doch Nach	Pascal Griesshammer		Drama
Kommunisten	Jean-Marie Straub	11 March 2015 (France)	Drama
La buca	Daniele Ciprì	25 September 2014 (Italy)	Comedy
Little Buddho	Danilo Beckovic	24 September 2014 (Serbia)	Comedy
Love Island	Jasmila Zbanic	9 October 2014 (Croatia)	Comedy
Manche Hunde müssen sterben	Laurent Wyss		Crime
Milky Way	Cyril Bron	January 2014 (Switzerland)	Comedy
A Normal Day in the Life	Vladimir Bieinisowitsch		Drama
Now or Never	Fredi M. Murer		Comedy
Oro verde	Mohammed Soudani	25 January 2014 (Switzerland)	Comedy
PURE: A Shades of Winter Movie	Mario Feil		Action
A Quintet	Roberto Cuzzillo	19 August 2014 (Bosnia and Herzegovina)	Comedy
Schwarzer Panther	Samuel Perriard	19 October 2014 (USA)	Drama
Schweizer Helden	Peter Luisi	13 August 2014 (Switzerland)	Comedy
Scrap Girl	Frank Luchs		Science Fiction
Second Life of Thieves	Ming Jin Woo	3 October 2014 (South Korea)	Drama
Shana: The Wolf's Music	Nino Jacusso	23 April 2015 (Germany)	Drama
Simplify Your Soul	Markus Boestfleisch	23 October 2014 (Germany)	Comedy
Simply gay le film	Benjamin Karmer	13 August 2014 (UK)	Drama
Therapy for a Vampire	David Rühm	19 December 2014 (Austria)	Comedy
They Chased Me Through Arizona	Matthias Huser	August 2014 (Switzerland)	Drama
Tim & Leon	André Kuenzy	1 September 2014 (Switzerland)	Comedy
Tyfelstei	Chris Bucher	April 2014 (Switzerland)	Mystery
Un Jour De plus En Moins	Adrien Gremaud		Drama
Viktoria: A Tale of Grace and Greed	Men Lareida	2 October 2014 (Hungary)	Drama
Waterfall 1: No Words, No Sex, Just Relax	Volker Bossert	2 June 2014 (Germany)	Family

== Notable deaths ==
Month	Date	Name	Age	Nationality	Profession	Notable films
February	1	Maximilian Schell	83	Austrian-Swiss	Actor	Judgment at Nuremberg; Deep Impact
May	12	H. R. Giger	74	Swiss	Visual effects	Alien; Prometheus

== See also ==
- 2014 in film
- 2014 in Switzerland
- Cinema of Switzerland
- List of Swiss submissions for the Academy Award for Best Foreign Language Film
