= Mathias Gnädinger =

Swiss actor (1941–2015)

- Born: 25 March 1941; Ramsen, Switzerland
- Died: 3 April 2015 (aged 74); Zürich, Switzerland
- Occupations: Stage and film actor
- Years active: 1968–2015
- Notable work: Leo Sonnyboy (1989); Journey of Hope (1990); Kinder der Landstrasse (1992); Sternenberg (2004); Downfall (2004); Usfahrt Oerlike (2015)

Mathias Gnädinger (25 March 1941 – 3 April 2015) was a Swiss stage and film actor.

== Career ==
Initially a typesetter and typographer, Gnädinger began his acting training at the Bühnenstudio Zürich (now part of the Zurich University of the Arts) from 1962 to 1966.

His first role in Swiss television was in 1968. He starred in Leo Sonnyboy, Das Boot ist voll, Journey of Hope and the Austrian-German-Swiss co-production Kinder der Landstrasse. Since 1988, he had worked as a freelance actor.

Gnädinger starred in about 70 character roles in television and German-language cinema, as well as stage actor in about 130 theater productions, among them at the Burgtheater in Vienna, the Schaubühne in Berlin, and the Schauspielhaus and Theater am Neumarkt in Zürich when latter was established in 1966. The Swiss drama film Usfahrt Oerlike was released in January 2015, and is the second last film starring Gnädinger alongside Jörg Schneider. According to the film's director Paul Riniker, a sequel was planned, but neither it nor another project focusing on the 74-year-old actor will be realized, as Gnädinger died on 3 April 2015.

In Mathias Gnädinger's last film, Der grosse Sommer, directed by Stefan Jäger, he plays Anton Sommer, a former Swiss wrestling champion in the footsteps of a Sumo wrestler in Japan. The production works in Japan were documented by 10vor10, and Gnädiger was absolutely fascinated by the old Japanese tradition, and his ten years old co-star Loïc Sho of Swiss-Japanese origin. Gnädinger said he got in touch with Swiss wrestling only once, as a boy. Ursula Gnädinger assisted her husband at the production works as make-up artist. The comedy is scheduled for release in the second half of 2015.

== Personal life ==
Born in Ramsen, Schaffhausen, Gnädinger lived in Stein am Rhein. He had four brothers and was raised on a farm. His mother was of Sicilian-Appenzell origin; she was the daughter of a typesetter and was educated in St. Gallen. Gnädinger's father was a farmer and the town clerk of Ramsen. Gnädinger married his former childhood sweetheart, Ursula, in 2004. He organized his career as an actor without an agency and managed everything himself. His wife Ursula later became his manager and assisted him in all aspects. "For him, this late love was a godsend."

== Death ==
Gnädinger died on 3 April 2015 in Zürich from cardiac complications and acute respiratory distress syndrome. The funeral took place within the family; a public acknowledgment was celebrated at Münster Schaffhausen on 16 April 2015.

== Awards (excerpt) ==
- 2014: Georg-Fischer Award for his lifetime work (Lebenswerk)
- 2012: Lifetime Award by the Swiss Television SRF (Lebenswerk)
- 2005: Swiss Film Prize, nominated Best Performance in a Leading Role (Bester Hauptdarsteller/Beste Hauptdarstellerin) for Ricordare Anna (2004)
- 2003: Swiss Film Prize, won Best Actor (Bester Darsteller) for Big Deal (2002)
- 2002: Swiss Film Prize nomination as Best Actor (Bester Darsteller) for Lieber Brad (2001)
- 1996: Hans Reinhart-Ring
- 1996: Prix Walo, won Actors on TV and film (Schauspieler)

== Filmography ==
- 1968: Die vier Brüder (Ich, TV) - Die vier Brüder #2
- 1970: Das Verhör von Habana - Ein Selbstbildnis der Konterrevolution (TV) - Pablo Prganvides Parada
- 1976: The Sudden Loneliness of Konrad Steiner - Sanitäter
- 1977: San Gottardo - Shop keeper
- 1977: Em Lehme si Letscht - Willi
- 1978: Heidi (TV series, 5 episodes) - Miller / Meunier
- 1979: Trilogie 1848: Der Galgensteiger (TV) - Johannes Gross
- 1979: Der Chinese (TV) - Kaltenegger
- 1980: St. Pauli-Landungsbrücken (TV)
- 1980: The Boat Is Full - Franz Flueckiger
- 1981: Der Erfinder - Spekulant
- 1982: Who's Crazy, Doc? - Nachtclubbesitzer
- 1983: Der Gemeindepräsident - Hans Sturzenegger
- 1986: Triumph der Liebe (TV)
- 1986: Du mich auch - Romeos Vater
- 1987: The Winner Takes All (TV) - Lirchmair
- 1987: Der elegante Hund (TV series)
- 1988: Spielergeschichten (TV series)
- 1988: Arbeitersaga (TV series) - Dr. Guido M. Lizenti
- 1989: La nuit de l'eclusier - Koebi
- 1989: Pestalozzi's Mountain - Büttel
- 1989: Gekauftes Glück - 'Hirschen'-Wirt
- 1989: Leo Sonnyboy - Leo Mangold
- 1990–2002: Tatort (TV series, 4 episodes) - Heinz Osburg / Alex Kerger / Schneider / Walter Howald
- 1990: Klassäzämekunft - Emil Brandenberger
- 1990: Bingo - Bingo
- 1990: Journey of Hope - Truckdriver Ramser
- 1990: Der Berg - Manser
- 1990: Winckelmann's Travels - Berner
- 1991: Tassilo - Ein Fall für sich (TV series) - Archivar
- 1992: Children of the Open Road - Roger Kessel
- 1992: Eurocops (TV series) - Armin Luchsinger
- 1993: Probefahrt ins Paradies - Freddie
- 1993: Der grüne Heinrich - L'oncle
- 1993: Justiz - Police Chief
- 1994: Joe & Marie - Marie's father
- 1994: Magic Hunter - Police Chief
- 1994: Jazz
- 1996: Tresko - Der Maulwurf (TV)
- 1996: Deutschlandlied (TV miniseries) - Hermann Sternke
- 2000: WerAngstWolf
- 2000: Comedian - Stephan Ernst
- 2001: Lieber Brad - Urs
- 2001: Im Namen der Gerechtigkeit (TV) - Adalbert Jentsch
- 2002: Big Deal (TV) - Walter Oberholzer
- 2002: Andreas Hofer (TV) - Marshal François Joseph Lefebvre
- 2003: Spital in Angst (TV) - Kommandant Bertschinger
- 2003–2006: Lüthi und Blanc (TV series, 169 episodes) - Ruedi Egger
- 2004: Sternenberg
- 2004: Downfall - Reichsmarschall Hermann Göring
- 2004: Das Paar im Kahn - Peter Hunkeler
- 2004: Ricordare Anna - Viktor Looser
- 2005: Hunkeler: Tod einer Ärztin - Peter Hunkeler
- 2005: Die Vogelpredigt
- 2005: Steinschlag (TV)
- 2007: Marmorera - Gregor Sonderegger
- 2008: Hunkeler macht Sachen (TV) - Peter Hunkeler
- 2009: Hunkeler und der Fall Livius (TV) - Peter Hunkeler
- 2010: Länger leben - Max Wanner
- 2011: Silberkiesel - Hunkeler tritt ab - Kommissar Hunkeler
- 2012: Hunkeler und die Augen des Ödipus (TV) - Peter Hunkeler
- 2014–2015: Der Bestatter (TV series, 8 episodes) - Louis Lauener
- 2015: Usfahrt Oerlike - Willi Keller
- 2015: Der grosse Sommer - Anton Sommer (final film role)
