= Ready, Steady, Charlie! =

- Theatrical release poster
- Directed by: Mike Eschmann
- Written by: David Keller; Michael Sauter
- Produced by: Lukas Hobi; Kurt Steiner; Mark Haeberli; Reto Schaerli
- Starring: Michael Koch; Melanie Winiger; Marco Rima
- Cinematography: Roland Schmid
- Edited by: Mike Schaerer
- Music by: Manuel Stagars
- Distributed by: Buena Vista International
- Release date: September 2003
- Running time: 92 minutes
- Country: Switzerland
- Language: Swiss German

Ready, Steady, Charlie! (German: Achtung, fertig, Charlie!) is a 2003 Swiss German-language comedy film directed by Mike Eschmann and written by David Keller and Michael Sauter. It stars Michael Koch, Melanie Winiger, and Marco Rima, and follows a young man who is called up to military recruit school on his wedding day and devises a plan to get expelled. The film set an opening-weekend record for a Swiss film and became the country’s most successful domestic film since The Swissmakers (1978).

== Synopsis ==
Just as he is about to marry his fiancée, Antonio is called up to Swiss military recruit school. Hoping to return home, he devises a plan to get expelled by seducing fellow recruit Michelle Bluntschi, the daughter of his commanding officer, and being caught breaking the barracks rules.

== Cast ==
The cast includes:

- Michael Koch as Antonio Carrera
- Melanie Winiger as Michelle Bluntschi
- Mia Aegerter as Laura Moretti
- Marco Rima as Captain Franz Reiker
- Mike Müller as Paolo

== Production ==
The film was developed with the involvement of the Swiss Federal Department of Defence, Civil Protection and Sport (VBS), which supported filming with material and sets. After the film was completed, however, the department distanced itself from its content and portrayal.

== Release and reception ==
The film premiered in September 2003. It had a record opening in Swiss cinemas, drawing 70,000 admissions by the end of its opening weekend and surpassing the previous Swiss film opening record set by Ernstfall in Havanna. By November 2003, it had surpassed 500,000 admissions in Switzerland, becoming the country’s most successful film since The Swissmakers (1978).

=== Awards and nominations ===
It won the 2003 Prix Walo for Best Film Production. It was later nominated for Best Fiction Film at the 2004 Swiss Film Awards, where Corinna Glaus won the Special Jury Prize.

=== Critical response ===
Filmdienst described it as a formulaic military comedy and criticised what it saw as the film’s reactionary propaganda.

== Festival screenings ==
In 2004, Ready, Steady, Charlie! was screened at the European Film Market, Filmfest Hamburg, the Swiss American Film Festival, and the Bratislava International Film Festival.
