= Paul Lüönd =

Swiss musician and politician (1950–2014)

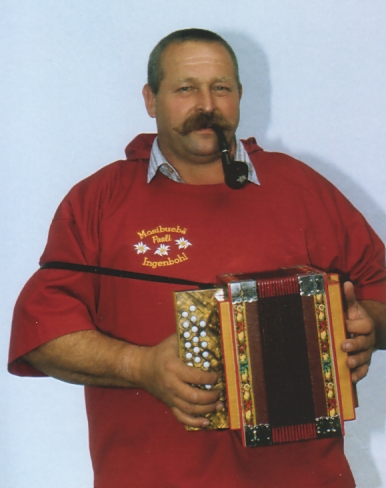
Paul Lüönd in the summer of 1999.

Paul Lüönd (15 April 1950 – 3 April 2014) was a Swiss musician and politician. He formed a group with his older two brothers called Mosibuäbe. He grew up in the Mosi in Ingenbohl and was a member of the right-wing populist Swiss People's Party.

He died on 3 April 2014 from a long illness in Switzerland, aged 63.

== Other websites ==
Media related to Paul Lüönd at Wikimedia Commons
