= Bankomatt =

1989 film

- Original film poster
- Directed by: Villi Hermann
- Written by: Villi Hermann; Giovanni Pascutto
- Produced by: Villi Hermann; Enzo Porcelli
- Starring: Bruno Ganz
- Cinematography: Carlo Varini
- Edited by: Fernanda Indoni
- Music by: Franco Piersanti
- Release date: February 1989
- Running time: 88 minutes
- Countries: Italy; Switzerland
- Language: Italian

Bankomatt is a 1989 Italian-Swiss drama film directed by Villi Hermann. It was entered into the 39th Berlin International Film Festival. The story follows a man planning and conducting a bank robbery. It is revealed he was formerly an employee of the bank, and is acting out of disgruntlement towards the current boss.

== Cast ==
- Bruno Ganz as Bruno
- Giovanni Guidelli as Stefano
- Francesca Neri as Maria
- Omero Antonutti as Ernesto Soldini
- Pier Paolo Capponi as Impiegato banca
- Roberto De Francesco as Amico di Stefano
- Fabrizio Cerusico
- Andrea Novicov
- Renata Pozzi
- Tatiana Winteler
