= Léa Fazer =

Swiss film director

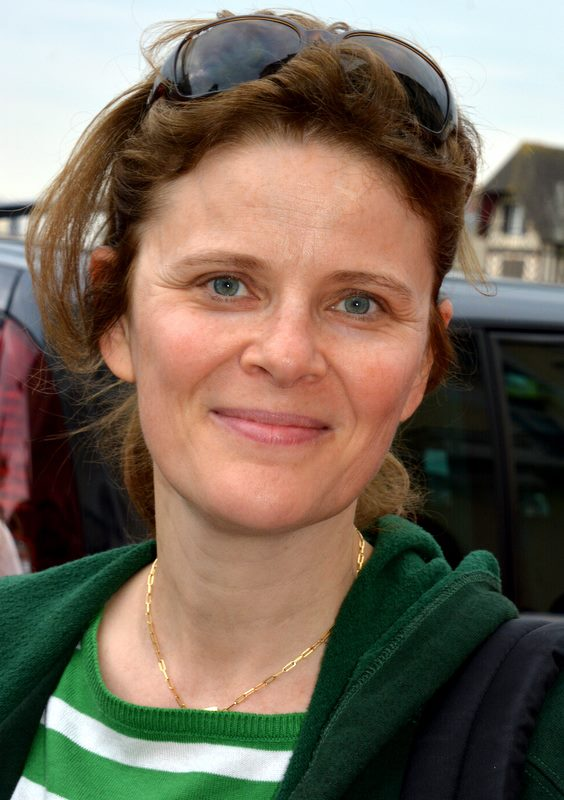
- Léa Fazer at the 2014 Cabourg Film Festival
- Born: 20 April 1965 (age 61); Geneva, Switzerland
- Occupations: Film director Screenwriter; Actor
- Years active: 2004–present

Léa Fazer (born 20 April 1965) is a Swiss film director, screenwriter and actress. She studied film at the University Paris Diderot. Her film Bienvenue en Suisse was screened in the Un Certain Regard section at the 2004 Cannes Film Festival.

== Filmography ==
Year	Title	Credited as			Notes
Year	Title	Director	Screenwriter	Actress	Notes
2004	Welcome to Switzerland	Yes	Yes		Nominated—Cannes Film Festival - Prix Un Certain Regard; Nominated—Cannes Film Festival - Caméra d'Or
2008	Notre univers impitoyable	Yes	Yes	Yes	
2008	Bientôt j'arrête	Yes	Yes		Short
2008	L'Autre Rive			Yes	Short
2010	Together Is Too Much	Yes	Yes		
2013	Cookie	Yes	Yes	Yes	
2013	Turning Tide			Yes	
2014	Maestro	Yes	Yes		
2015	Mystère à la Tour Eiffel	Yes			Telefilm
2015	Mystery at the Opera	Yes			Telefilm
2016	Nadia	Yes			Telefilm
