= The Homeless One =

1981 film

- Directed by: Villi Hermann
- Written by: Angelo Gregorio; Villi Hermann
- Produced by: Villi Hermann
- Starring: Omero Antonutti
- Cinematography: Carlo Varini
- Release date: 1981
- Running time: 90 minutes
- Country: Switzerland
- Language: Italian

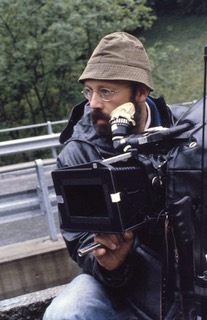
Villi Hermann on the set

The Homeless One (Italian: Matlosa) is a 1981 Swiss drama film directed by Villi Hermann. It was entered into the 13th Moscow International Film Festival.

== Cast ==
- Omero Antonutti as Alfredo
- Francesca De Sapio
- Flavio Bucci as Il matlosa
- Nico Pepe as Zio Poldo
- Roger Jendly as Vincent
- Mario Marchetti
- Cleto Cremonesi
- Salvatore Landolina
- Roberto Pistone
