= Viktor Giacobbo =

Swiss writer, comedian and actor (born 1952)

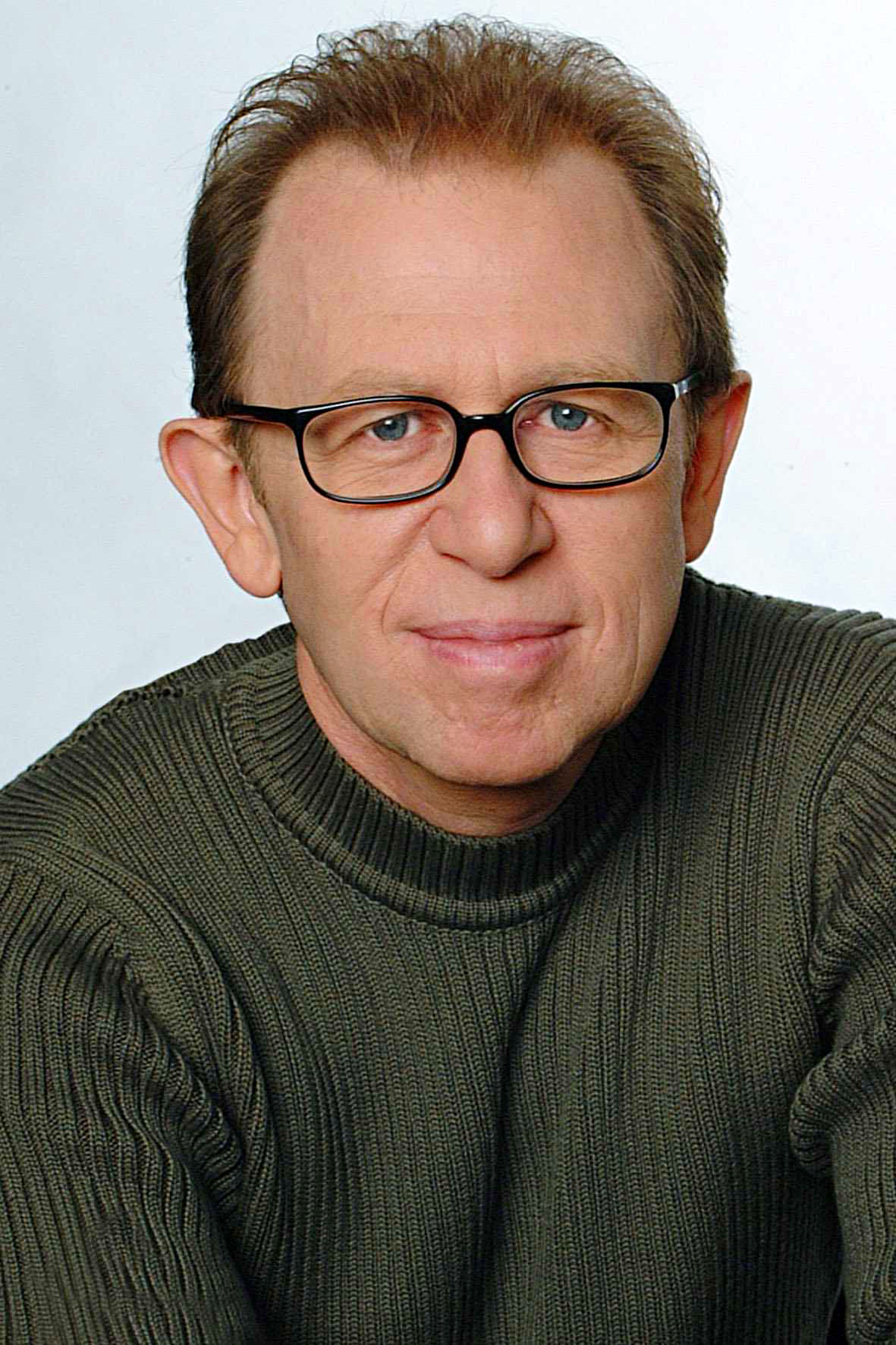
Viktor Giacobbo

Viktor Giacobbo (born 6 February 1952) is a Swiss writer, comedian and actor.

== Life ==
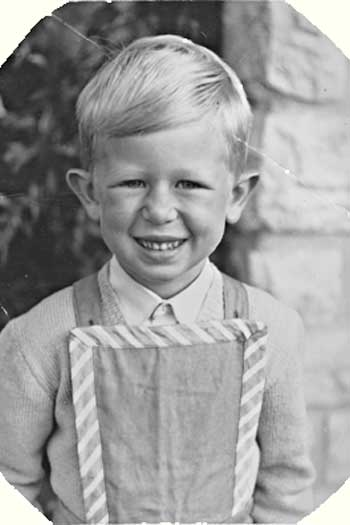
Giacobbo as a child

After school in Winterthur, he made an apprenticeship as a typesetter. Afterwards, he was a corrector, reader and media documentalist. Initially, he was an author and actor at the independent comedy-theatre groups “Stuzzicadenti” (1979–1986) and “Zampanoo's Variété” (1984–1985), then a member of the comedy group “Harul's Top Service” (1985–1998). He worked for Radio DRS’ satire programme Satiramisù (1991–1994).

During the 90s, he created satirical figures like Harry Hasler, Debbie Mötteli, Fredi Hinz and Erwin Bischofberger (see below for detailed list). He became well known, thanks to his job as a moderator and co-author of the satirical programmes Viktors Programm (1990–1994) and Viktors Spätprogramm (1995–2002) on SF DRS and as an author and main actor in the film Ernstfall in Havanna (2002). In 2000, Giacobbo initiated, together with Patrick Frey and others, the “Casinotheater” Winterthur. Since then, he has been Verwaltungsrats-Präsident of the „Casinotheater AG”. In 2006 he was the Circus Knie’s guest star. He lives near Winterthur.

== Characters played ==
- Alter ego

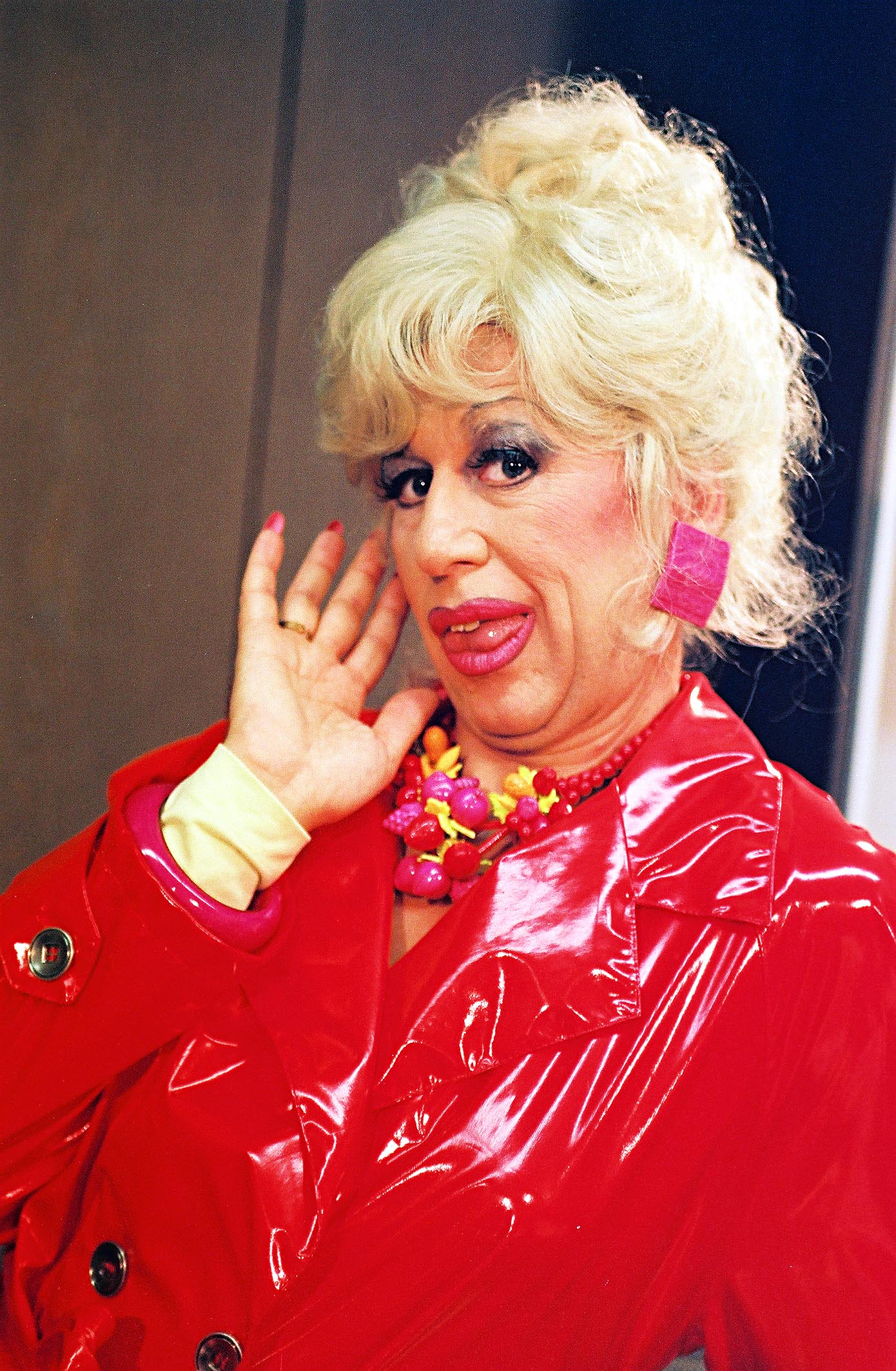
"Debbie Mötteli"

Giacobbo sometimes plays himself as a selfish, arrogant egoist, who is accompanied by bodyguards who hold back the fans. As part of this characterization: he has a desk full of goblets, a large poster showing himself, and gets paid for product placement in reportages for the Schweizer Illustrierte, a Swiss personality magazine. He refuses a children's home's offer to take part in a ceremony because the offer doesn't offer a large enough honorarium. Furthermore, Giacobbo cuts Walter Andreas Müller’s gage. Giacobbo plays a video to show Müller, how miserable Müller's acting was, but the acting shown is Giacobbo’s. Müller is hustled out of the office and gets the commission and honorarium to participate in the children’s home ceremony.

This alternative Giacobbo is depicted as a man who originally was respectable, prudish and very uptight. The sketch indicates that his real name had been “Erwin Bischofberger“ (see below) but he had adopted the improbable and discordant alias of “Viktor Giacobbo“ combining the Germanic version of a forename, and an Italian family name. TV director Peter Schellenberg discovered him, when Bischofberger was singing as a female yodler in a duet. But Bishofberger/Giacobbo had a big success after he had stolen the idea to disguise himself as “Harry Hasler” (see below). This idea allegedly had been stolen from a Chinese programme's main persona, and the Harry Hasler persona was the occidental copy of that Asian figure called "Ha Li Hassel“.

- Harry Hasler, (persona allegedly born 1952 in Weinfelden).

Is a typical macho Manta-driver, he plays a bouncer and pimp from Zürich's "Stadtkreis Schwamendingen“ ( a Zürich City district). His favourite holiday destination is Pattaya, Thailand. His attributes are a hairy chest, white country singer's clothing and golden necklaces. A typical gesture is standing on one leg and angling the other, then stretching it and angling it again (as in pushing an automobile gas pedal). Typical words: "aber volle Pulle, Du!“ (Give it gas man!), "Wennt weisch was i mein!“ (If you know what I mean!), or the greeting formula "Saletti zäme!“ (Hi there!). He doesn't visit Thailand to see culture and huge Buddha sculptures or temples but rather have “meetings” (sexual ones).

Hasler once was a guest on a fictional programme about travelling, to tell the viewers about "Mailand" (Milan, Italy) however, there was an error in understanding and the city actually being discussed was Venice, Italy. Furthermore, Hasler thinks, the gondola (of which he shows a model) was a fertility goddess symbol. According to Viktors Universum 1, DVD 1/2, Hasler earns money by selling these souvenirs. Other sketches show Hasler in other jobs: leader of a private army of civilians, and hawker (seller) at an esoteric fair. Regularly, Hasler is said to be a producer/seller of adult movies.

Hasler drives a "Chevrolet Corvette Stingray“. One of his favourite locals (tavern or pub) is the "Pattaya" bar, a bar that actually exists in Zürich. Harry has a father, who resembles himself, Konrad Hasler. Further, he has an uncle, that isn't similar to him, but is a regular and respectable-looking elder man, who is a bit silent.

According to a comment by Giaccobo, Hasler's first appearance was in a sketch about a fictional discussion programme, that dealt with humour. But then, he wasn't called "Hasler", but "Grüter" or "Grütter". He doesn't really enrich the fictional discussion programme but tells jokes about Manta drivers instead of discussing humour.

Giacobbo played a Christmas Santa on the street which was filmed by a hidden camera. The "Santa" spoke like Harry Hasler, and pretended to intimately (physically) know a female passerby. In another sequence, the "Santa" had the "Italian guy"'s (see below) pronunciation.

Disguised as Harry Hasler, Giacobbo moderated a programme of Viktors Spätprogramm. Fredi Hinz Is a "typical" homeless doper. His attributes are unkempt hair and clothing, as well as a plastic bag, which he carries all the time. His style of speaking is in fits and starts, aspirating, like a heavy smoker. He often begs for two "zwei Schtutz" (Swiss-German dialect for "zwei Franken" - "two Swiss Franks") to sleep at the Notschlafstelle (emergency/homeless sleeping shelter).

A surprising aspect of Hinz' character is his (very seldom) intellectual thoughts. For example: when he has to interview fictional expert Stolte-Benrad (Patrick Frey) concerning Iraq, he awkwardly searches the question list, while the expert gets angry. The expert starts talking despite there's no question, but suddenly, Fredi interrupts him and claims, that the expert is wrong because the discussed "region obviously was coined monotheistic". He shows bits of deep knowledge and blames the expert for a short moment - just to start talking about "black Afghan", "red Lebanese" and other types of the region's "shit" (hemp) afterwards again.

Disguised as Fredi Hinz, Giacobbo moderated a programme of Viktors Spätprogramm, in which he interviewed the (real) sect leader Uriella.

- Rajiv Prasad

A man from India, that is incessantly keen on money. He speaks bad English, with a staccato Indian accent. He deals and arranges everything. Once, he even tried to sell Indian soccer players to the Swiss team. He would even agree to sell his own sister when the price is right.

Right-wing politician Christoph Mörgeli criticised Giacobbo for discriminating against Indian people. However, the Swiss Indian community immediately replied that they don't feel being discriminated by the Rajiv character.

Disguised as Rajiv Prasad, Giacobbo moderated a programme of Viktors Spätprogramm.

- Debbie Mötteli

She and her girlfriends (allegedly) are the typical "Goldcoast chicks"

Zürich Goldcoast, on the right side of Lake Zürich, where residents are allegedly noted for high incomes, expensive residences and villas, and an upscale lifestyle. The name "Goldcoast" comes from the large amount of afternoon sunlight which the south-facing ridge side area receives compared to adjoining areas

Debbie wears a waterproof red coat, and is uneducated and naive. She doesn't even recognize Hitler, when finding him in an archive's cupboard. Hitler makes his gestures and rantings, but Mötteli just asks, who this man "with the little moustache" was.

In a certain sketch, Debbie's boyfriend is introduced as a trucker called Küde (Mike Müller), who plans to blacken the traffic ministre

with Debbie like Monica Lewinsky with Bill Clinton.

Disguised as Debbie Mötteli, Giacobbo moderated a programme of Viktors Spätprogramm, in which he interviewed Gunvor and Nella Martinetti.

- Dr. Klöti

Is a very nervous expert, who speaks extremely fast. For example, he gives banal tips to stop smoking, or a very short quiz containing absurd and doubtable questions.

- Prelate Morgenthaler and Sister (Viktoria) Morgenthaler (a nun)

Are from Catholic clerics, both with the same ugly teeth. The prelate once acted as a clerical occupational counsellor, who degrades bishop Wolfgang Haas after a laughable qualifying examination.

The nun appears in a fictional TV-advertising spot, which tries to find new members for church. (Do you know the Landeskirche? Do you know, that only every second person is member? (...) Call now!). This advertising is made like callsex-commercials, with the nun winking seductively.

The "Landeskirche" is the official state church in each canton -- can be Protestant or Roman Catholic depending on the historical religious population of the canton.

- 'Erwin Bischofberger

Is an uptight library employee (according to other comments, he is a counsellor for enterprises, too. Once, Bischofberger even spoke at a real meeting of a real Swiss enterprise). He has huge glasses. In a fictional coupling show, Bischofberger's hobby is described to be riding a "motorcycle" - the following part of the film shows him riding a moped.

- Jakob Liniger

A pensioner with shifted bit

and partially bald head. He is anchorman of the fictional programme „Bettflucht“.

- Sonny Boppeler, called Jack Boppeler, too

A soccer coach, that isn't very sympathetic. In one sketch, he tries to deal with African players.

- Italian-guy (called "Gian-Franco Benelli". In the sketch "Die Weihnachtsgeschichte" ("The Christmas Tale"), Benelli who is an Italian guest worker (foreign labourer), speaks a bad but fast Swiss German. His cadence is rhythmic and "Italian", as are his gestures. He seemingly doesn't know dialectical Swiss-German spoken grammar and therefore he makes mistakes such as "double verbs", etc.. Furthermore, he doesn't really assume a conversation's momentane content, but simply

shouts his typical phrases, e.g. „Chasche nitte mache!“ (You can't do that!).

- Turkish- or Kurd-guy (called "Mehmet Örkan" in sketch "Der neue Arena-Moderator")

A seldom seen figure, a bit similar to the Italian guy, but with different hair (partially grey). According to the sketch "Der neue Arena-Moderator", he is a "weapons dealer and mafioso". In a fictive discussion of the programme "Arena", he celebrates himself, putting his hands in the air and making gestures to increase his own applause. The (real) Kurt Aeschbacher, who plays the moderator, says that Örkan speaks the Swiss German dialect of Berne very well - But Örkan only says a few, merely unclear, words and imitates gun sounds.

Possibly because of their similarity, "Turkish/Kurd-guy" and "Italian-guy" are in the same folder on Viktors Universum DVD 1½, which has a chapter menu that organizes sketches after the figures appearing in the sketch.

== Real persons that were parodied (a selection) ==
- Roger Schawinski
- Ueli Maurer
- Martina Hingis

Further, there were e.g. parodies of: Carla Del Ponte, Jean Ziegler, Christoph Blocher, Wolfgang Haas, Ursula Koch, but these parodies were by other actors of the programme: (Mike Müller, Peter Fischli, Walter Andreas Müller, Birgit Steinegger, Patrick Frey etc.)

There are also fictive figures played by others:

- Mauro, an Italian of the 2nd generation Mike Müller
- Herr Schupisser, expert and ambassador Andrej Togni

== Publications ==
- columnist for news magazine „Facts“ (1995–1999)
- columnist for „Tages-Anzeiger“ (since 1999)
- „Spargel der Vergeltung“ (collected columns), edition "Kein & Aber" (1998)
- Calendar for 1999 and 2001 „Viktors Wandprogramm“, edition "Kein & Aber" (1998, 2000)

== Films and programmes on VHS, CD and DVD ==
- CD Saletti, Rap alias Harry Hasler (1996)
- Videocassette Volle Pulle, alias Harry Hasler, Warner Home Video (1996)
- Videocassette Viktors Spätprogramm - Selection, Warner Home Video (1998–2001)
- DVD Viktors Universum 1 & 2, Warner Home Video (2000, 2001)
- DVD Ernstfall in Havanna, Warner Home Video, Vega Film (2002)
- DVD Viktors Universum - Finale, Warner Home Video (2003)
- CD Sickmen, Audio-CD of the theatre play, edition "Kein & Aber" (2004)
- DVD Undercover, Vega Film (2005)
- CD Fredi Hinz - Unstoned, Audio-CD, edition "Kein & Aber" (2005)
- Movie script writer (with Domenico Blass), actor and co-producer of Ernstfall in Havanna, Director: Sabine Boss (2001/2002)
- Actor in Germanikus by Gerhard Polt (2004)

== Awards ==
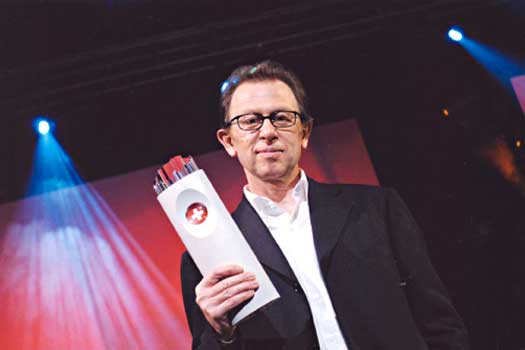
Swiss Awards 2002

- Salzburger Stier 1991 (with Birgit Steinegger)
- Telepreis 1996
- Prix Walo (Category: Medienschaffende) 1996
- Prix Walo for „Viktors Spätprogramm“ (Category: Fernsehsendung) 1997
- Prix Walo for „Viktors Spätprogramm“ (Category: Fernsehproduktion) 2001
- Swiss Award 2002 (Category: Showbusiness)
- Spezialpreis für Fernsehsatire, Oltner Cabarettage, 2003
