= Vanity (2015 film) =

- Film poster
- Directed by: Lionel Baier
- Written by: Lionel Baier; Julien Bouissoux
- Produced by: Estelle Fialon; Frédéric Mermoud; Agnieszka Ramu
- Starring: Patrick Lapp; Carmen Maura
- Cinematography: Patrick Lindenmaier
- Edited by: Jean-Christope Hym
- Release date: 18 May 2015 (CFF)
- Running time: 75 minutes
- Countries: Switzerland; France
- Language: French

Vanity (French: La Vanité) is a 2015 French / Swiss drama film directed by Lionel Baier.

The film stars Patrick Lapp as David Miller, a man in his 70s who checks into a fleabag motel with the intention of committing assisted suicide. He discusses his motivations with Esperanza (Carmen Maura), the administrator of the clinic who is assigned to assist in his death, but the situation is complicated when the legal requirement for a second witness brings Treplev (Ivan Georgiev), a Russian rent boy who is servicing clients in the next room and who awakens David's own repressed homosexuality, into the situation.

The film premiered in the ACID program at the 2015 Cannes Film Festival, where it was a nominee for the Queer Palm.

== Cast ==
- Patrick Lapp - David Miller
- Carmen Maura - Esperanza
- Ivan Georgiev - Treplev
- Adrien Barazzone
- Stéphanie Blanchoud
- Stéphanie Chuat
- Véronique Reymond
