= Villi Hermann =

Swiss film director (born 1941)

- Born: 1941 (age 84–85); Lucerne, Switzerland
- Occupations: Film director Screenwriter
- Years active: 1969-present

Villi Hermann (born 1941) is a Swiss film director and screenwriter. His 1981 film The Homeless One was entered into the 13th Moscow International Film Festival. His 1989 film Bankomatt - with actor Bruno Ganz in the leading role - was entered into the 39th Berlin International Film Festival.

== Filmography ==
=== Director ===
- Fed Up (1969)
- 24 su 24 (1970)
- 10ème Essai (1970
- Eine Lokalzeitung im Wandel der Zeit (1972)
- Processed By... (1972)
- Cerchiamo per subito operai, offriamo... (Wanted: Labourers) (1974)
- San Gottardo (1977)
- It's Cold in Brandenburg (Kill Hitler) (1980)
- The Homeless One (1981)
- Innocenza (1986)
- Bankomatt (1989)
- Siamo tutti pedoni (1990)
- En voyage avec Jean Mohr (In viaggio con Jean Mohr) (1992)
- Per un raggio di gloria (For a Spoke of Glory) (1996)
- Giovanni Orelli. Finestre aperte (Giovanni Orelli. Open Windows) (1998)
- TAMARO. Pietre e angeli. Mario Botta Enzo Cucchi (1998)
- Luigi Einaudi. Diario dall'esilio svizzero (2000)
- Mussolini, Churchill e cartoline (Mussolini, Churchill and Postcards) (2004)
- Walker. Renzo Ferrari (2004)
- Sam Gabai. Presences (2005)
- Greina (2006)
- Pédra. A Reporter without Borders (2006)
- DJ Mafio. Positive Vibes (2008)
- From Somewhere to Nowhere. On the road in China with photographer Andreas Seibert (2009)
- Gotthard Schuh. A Sensual Vision of the World (2011)
- CHoisir à vingt ans (CHoosing at Twenty) (2017)
- Ultime sfornata (2020)
- Ultime mazza (2021)
- Ultime luci rosse (2021)

=== Producer ===
- Ombre by Alberto Meroni (2008)
- Sinestesia by Erik Bernasconi (2010)
- The Ice Sculptor by Alberto Meroni (2010)
- Tapperman by Alberto Meroni (2012)
- Tutti Giù by Niccolò Castelli (2012)
- La Buca by Daniele Ciprì (2014)
- Oltre il confine. La storia di Ettore Castiglioni by Andrea Azzetti e Federico Massa (2017)
- La Bataille d'Alger, un film dans l'Histoire by Malek Bensmaïl (2017)
- Cronofobia by Francesco Rizzi (2018)
- La fin da la val l'è mia la fin dal mund (The End of the Valley Is Not the End of the World) by Peter Frei (2018)
- Atlas by Niccolò Castelli (2021)
- Il sergente dell'Altopiano. La storia di Mario Rigoni Stern by Tommaso Brugin e Federico Massa (2022)
