= Thomas Koerfer =

Swiss director, screenwriter and film producer (born 1944)

- Born: 23 March 1944 (age 81); Bern, Switzerland
- Occupation: Filmmaker

Thomas Koerfer (born 23 March 1944) is a Swiss film director, screenwriter and producer.

== Life and career ==
Born in Bern, Koerfer studied economics and sociology in Berlin, Munich and St. Gallen. He started his career as assistant director of Alexander Kluge and Brunello Rondi. His film debut The Death of the Flea Circus Director was screened at the International Critics' Week of the 1974 Cannes Film Festival, while his 1983 film Embers entered the main competition at the 40th Venice International Film Festival.

== Filmography ==
- The Death of the Flea Circus Director (Der Tod des Flohzirkusdirektors oder Ottocaro Weiss reformiert seine Firma, 1973)
- Der Gehülfe (1975)
- Alzire oder der neue Kontinent (1977)
- Die Leidenschaftlichen (1981)
- Embers (1983)
- Konzert für Alice (1985)
- Noch ein Wunsch (TV-movie, 1989)
- Exit Genua (1990)
- Gesichter der Schweiz (1991)
