= Leo Sonnyboy =

- Swiss DVD cover showing Dieter Meier, Mathias Gnädinger and Christian Kohlund
- Directed by: Rolf Lyssy
- Written by: Rolf Lyssy
- Produced by: Edi Hubschmid
- Starring: Mathias Gnädinger; Christian Kohlund; Ankie Lau; Stephanie Glaser
- Cinematography: Hans Liechti
- Edited by: Lilo Gerber
- Music by: Ruedi Häusermann
- Release date: 15 December 1989
- Running time: 95 min
- Languages: Swiss German, English

Leo Sonnyboy is a 1989 Swiss film directed by Rolf Lyssy. The comedy was filmed in Zürich and at various locations in Switzerland, and produced in Switzerland.

== Plot ==
Leo (Mathias Gnädinger) is about 40-year-old man who lives as a single in Zürich. He works as a train driver and is mothered by his Mama (Stefanie Glaser), but seems to be a bit solitary. His best friend Adrian (Christian Kohlund) has a serious problem with the Fremdenpolizei authorities, the immigration police of Switzerland, as his girlfriend Apia Kolong (Ankie Lau) from Thailand works as an exotic dancer, but Adrian is already married with children. Leo is persuaded by Adrian to marry Apia to allow her to continue living in Switzerland. Leo and Apia fall in love, and Apia wants to change her life. Problems and irritations ensue.

== Cast ==
- Mathias Gnädinger : Leo Mangold
- Christian Kohlund : Adrian Hauser
- Stephanie Glaser : Mama Mangold
- Ankie Lau : Apia Kolong
- Dieter Meier : Willi Zeier

== Reception ==
The Swiss comedy was one of the most successful films in the Swiss German cinemas between 1975 and 2004, and had an audience of 131,572 people. The comedy is distributed on DVD (RC 2). On 16 March 1991 the comedy started also at the New York New Directors/New Films Festival.

== Soundtrack ==
Dieter Meier of Yello played a demimonde businessmen, and so Yello also distributed the soundtrack.
