= Mia Aegerter =

Swiss musician (born 1976)

- Born: Mia Aegerter; October 9, 1976 (age 49); Fribourg, Switzerland
- Occupations: Musician; * Model  * Actress  * Songwriter  * Columnist
- Years active: 2000–present
- Notable work: Gute Zeiten, Schlechte Zeiten; * Achtung, fertig, Charlie! * So wie I bi / The way I am
- Awards: PRIX WALO (2003); * VIVA COMET (Best CH Act)  * Swiss Award

Mia Aegerter is a Swiss musician, model, and stage and film actress.

== Childhood and early career ==
Aegerter was born on October 9, 1976, into an artist family in Fribourg, Switzerland. Her parents were members of a band, which drew Aegerter to the stage at an early age. She started working as a model and took part in many talent competitions. At a young age, she won the "Little-Prix Walo," an important talent competition for young artists in Switzerland. She also succeeded in the famous "Bravo Girl - Model Contest,“ in Germany.

At fifteen, she began to write her own songs. After a yearlong stay in America, she graduated from high-school and moved to Munich to study music, dance, and acting. After a short time, Aegerter was discovered by a talent scout and moved to Berlin, Germany.

== Musical and film career ==
From 2000 to 2003, she became famous for starring as "Xenia di Montalban" in eight episodes of Gute Zeiten Schlechte Zeiten, the most successful daily soap opera in Germany at the time.

At the beginning of 2003, Aegerter had a breakthrough in the national music scene. Her single, "U don't know how to love me," achieved high radio-ratings and got into the Top 20 of the Swiss single charts and the Top 40 of the German single charts. Shortly after, Aegerter played the role of “Laura Moretti” in the film Achtung, fertig, Charlie, which came in second on the list of the most successful Swiss movies ever made (with over 560'000 entries at the box office as of 2011; behind Rolf Lyssy's classic "Schweizermacher" of 1978 with over 940'000 tickets sold). The film was also released in France, Germany, Italy, Russia and the USA, where it was renamed, Ready, Steady, Charlie!. Aegerter also composed and sang the film's title song, "Hie u Jetzt," which became a hit in Switzerland, reaching the Top 5 of the Swiss single charts. She received prizes and honors for her work, including the PRIX WALO in 2003, the VIVA COMET in the category of "Best of all CH Act," and the famous SWISS AWARD.

With her debut album, So wie I bi / The way I am, released in 2004, Aegerter proved that she is not only an excellent dialect singer, but very expressive with English lyrics. With the song, "Alive," she took part in the German selection to the "Grand Prix d'Eurovision". "Alive" was her fourth single release and got into the Swiss and German charts.

In January 2005, the Album So wie I bi / The way I am went gold in Switzerland.

In the same year, Aegerter played the female lead in the Swiss film, Leben auf Kredit, which also played in France and Italy. She also hosted the weekly youth magazine, Bravo TV, for one year. Bravo TV was also broadcast in Germany, Switzerland and Austria.

After many unplugged gigs in 2004-2005, she and her rock band, were a supporting-act of Ronan Keating's German Tour, which allowed them to perform on the biggest stages in the country. Aegerter also had her own Club Tour in Switzerland and played in various open-air festivals.

== Other skills ==
Besides acting in various plays and movies in Switzerland and Germany, Aegerter's main passion remains the music and the songwriting. Her lyrics have a healthy portion of provocative irony. She takes the listeners on a journey through her thoughts and beliefs.

She extended her writing, by working for three years, as a columnist for the Neue Luzerner Zeitung, a renowned daily Swiss newspaper.

== Albums ==
| Year | Information | Chart positions |
| Year | Information | SWI |
|---|---|---|
| 2004 | So wie i bi / The Way I Am: Debut studio album; Released: 26 October 2004 | 5 |
| 2006 | Vo Mänsche u Monschter / Of Humans & Monsters: Second studio album; Released: 6 September 2006 | 21 |
| 2009 | Chopf oder Buuch: Third studio album; Released: 1 January 2009 | 17 |
| 2012 | Gränzgängerin: Fourth studio album; Released: 7 September 2012 | 33 |
| 2017 | Nichts für Feiglinge: Fifth studio album; Released: 26 May 2017 | 60 |

== Singles ==
| Year | Single | Chart positions | | Album |
| Year | Single | SWI | GER | Album |
|---|---|---|---|---|
| 2003 | "U don't know how to love me" | 19 | 78 | So wie i bi / The way I am |
| 2003 | "Hie u jetzt / Right here " | 5 | — | So wie i bi / The way I am |
| 2004 | "So wie i bi" | 4 | — | So wie i bi / The way I am |
| 2005 | "Alive" | 36 | 92 | So wie i bi / The way I am |
| 2006 | "Meischterwärk" | 55 | — | Vo Mänsche u Monschter / Of Humans & Monsters |
| 2009 | "Land in Sicht" | — | — | Chopf oder Buuch |
