= Sternenberg (film) =

- Swiss film poster for Sternernberg
- Directed by: Christoph Schaub
- Written by: Sabine Pochhammer; Micha Lewinsky
- Produced by: Bernard Lang
- Starring: Mathias Gnädinger; Walo Lüönd; Stephanie Glaser
- Cinematography: Peter Indergand
- Edited by: Marina Wernli
- Music by: Balz Bachmann; Peter Bräker
- Distributed by: Buena Vista International
- Release date: 22 April 2004
- Running time: 90 minutes
- Country: Switzerland
- Language: Swiss German

Sternenberg is a 2004 Swiss German language film. It was filmed and produced at locations in the canton of Zürich in Switzerland, and stars Mathias Gnädinger, Walo Lüönd and Stephanie Glaser.

== Plot ==
Franz (Mathias Gnädinger) is shocked when he returns after 30 years to his hometown Sternenberg – the primary school of Sternenberg will be closed as there is a just a handful of students in the small isolated village in the Töss Valley, and the teacher thus would lose her job. Franz is personally concerned and hides a secret, as the teacher, Eva Joos (Sara Capretti), is his daughter. But he did not dare to tell Eva that he is her father. Eva also repeatedly stressed that her father was an "asshole" who had never been interested in his family; she would not want to meet him, even if she could. To help Eva and to get in touch to her, Franz decides to save the school, and goes about this task in an unusual way: he enrolls as a student and pretends that he had not attended school as a child. He therefore claims his "right to education". The trick seems to work, and the minimum number of students is reached, but it needs to ensure that the school will continuously be funded. Franz goes along with the children to school, thus Eva reacts very dismissive at first, but the being to get closer.

== Cast ==
- Sara Capretti as Eva Joos
- Mathias Gnädinger as Franz Engi
- Walo Lüönd as Hans Grob
- Stephen Sikder as Babu Sivaganeshan
- Daniel Rohr as Oskar Freudiger
- Hanspeter Müller as Walter Jauch
- Stephanie Glaser as alte Dame (old lady)
- Ettore Cella as älterer Herr (older gentleman)

== Title ==
The title of the film derives from the former independent municipality of Sternenberg that merged in 2015 with Bauma ZH.

== Production ==
Sternenberg was shot in the village of Sternenberg in the Canton of Zürich and at various locations in Switzerland. One of the main locations, the historical restaurant Sternenberg that was first mentioned in 1703, burnt down on 18 December 2016. The film was produced in Switzerland.

== Reception ==
Produced as a TV-Movie for the Swiss Television SRF, after its airing the producers decided to release it theatrically in Swiss German cinemas on 22 April 2004, becoming the most successful Swiss Film of 2004. The broadcast on SRF 1 on 3 October 2004 attracted more than 816,000 viewers.

== Festivals ==
- 2004 Baden-Baden TV Film Festival.
- 2004 Genève Festival Tous Ecrans.
- 2005 Solothurn Film Festival.
- 2006 Pyongyang International Film Festival.

== Awards ==
- 2004 Genève Festival Tous Ecrans, Prix FNAC du Public.
- 2004 Prix Walo, Beste Filmproduktion.
- 2004 Baden-Baden TV Film Festival, nominated as 3Sat Audience Award for Christoph Schaub.
- 2005 Swiss Film Prize, nominated as Best Film (Bester Spielfilm) for Christoph Schaub.
- 2005 Solothurn Film Festival, nominated as Best Fiction Film.
- 2006 Pyongyang International Film Festival, Best Actress Award.
