= Stefan Kurt =

Swiss actor

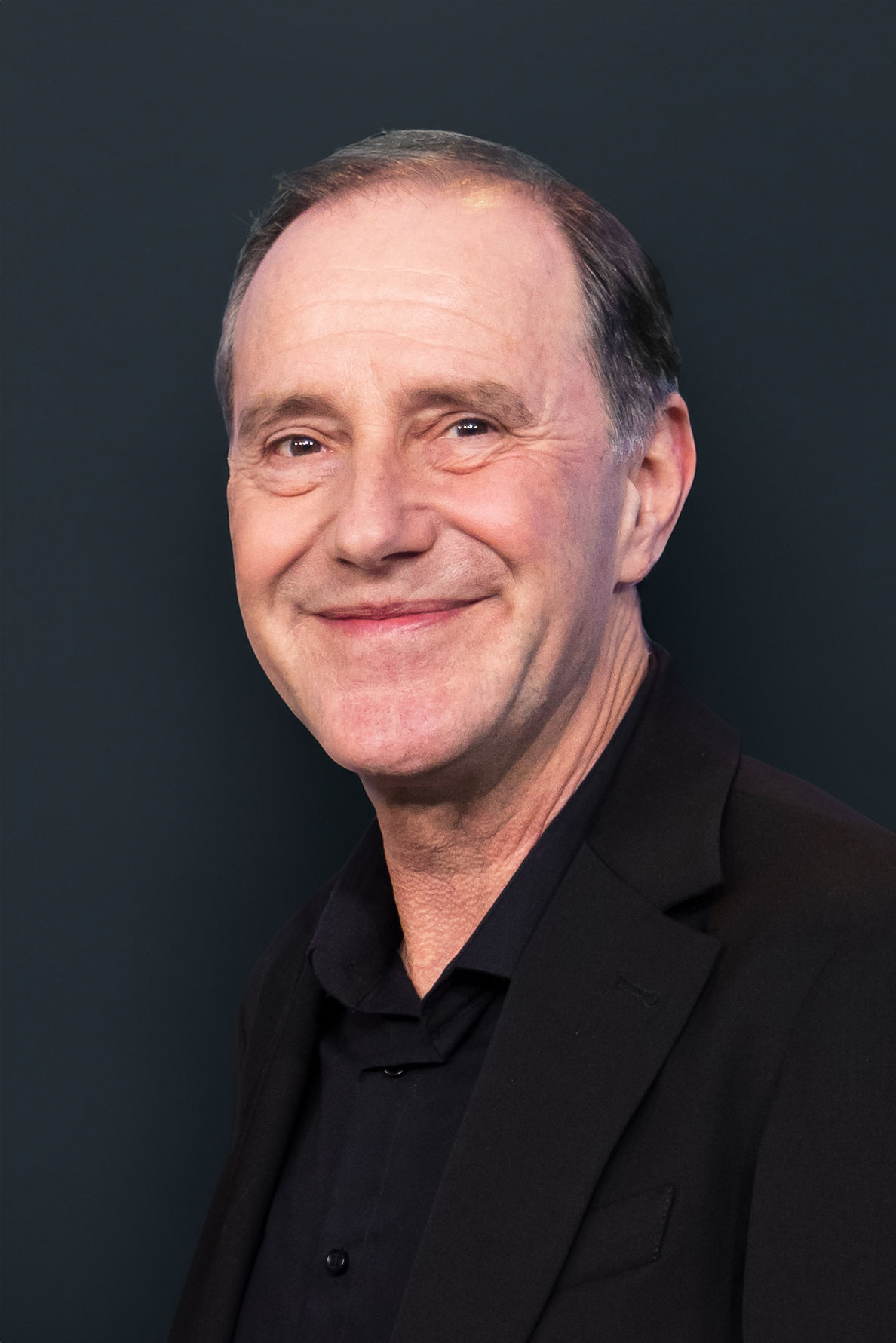
Image of Stefan Kurt

Stefan Kurt (born 22 October 1959 in Bern) is a Swiss actor. He attended the University of the Arts Bern before pursuing a professional acting career. He performed on stage as well as in more than fifty films since 1993.

== Selected filmography ==
Year	Title	Role	Notes
1998	Daybreak	David Gladbaker	TV film
1999	Beresina, or the Last Days of Switzerland	Claude Bürki	
1999	Long Hello and Short Goodbye	Doctor	
2000	Cloned to Kill	Dr. Straub	TV film
2002	Die Affäre Semmeling	Sigi Semmeling	TV miniseries
2002	Birdseye	"Birdseye"	
2002	Big Girls Don't Cry	Hans	
2004	The Other Woman	Stefan Schumacher	TV film
2006	Four Minutes	Meyerbeer	
2007	My Führer – The Really Truest Truth about Adolf Hitler	Albert Speer	
2007	Suddenly Gina	Gerd Jonas	TV film
2009	Haus und Kind	Bernd Neubauer	TV film
2009	Being Mr. Kotschie	Jürgen Kotschie	
2010	Anatomy of Evil (first episode)	Michael Sand	TV film
2011	Alive and Ticking	Uncle Bernie	
2011	The Foster Boy	Bösiger	
2012	Glory: A Tale of Mistaken Identities	Leo Richter	
2013	Lovely Louise	André	
2013	Akte Grüninger	Paul Grüninger	
2015	Me and Kaminski	Bogovich	
2017	Papa Moll	Papa Moll	
