= Stupid Boy (film) =

- French: Garçon stupide
- Directed by: Lionel Baier
- Written by: Lionel Baier, Laurent Guido
- Produced by: Robert Boner
- Starring: Pierre Chatagny, Natacha Koutchoumov
- Distributed by: Picture This!
- Release date: 10 March 2004 (Switzerland)
- Running time: 94 minutes
- Country: Switzerland
- Language: French

Stupid Boy (French: Garçon stupide) is a 2004 Swiss film directed by Lionel Baier. The film addresses the life of the gay community in the canton of Vaud.

== Plot ==
20-year-old Loic works by day in a chocolate factory, and by night cruises the internet for sex with older men. His life is a series of pointless anonymous sexual encounters until he meets one man who appears to be interested in him for himself, and not just his body.

Loic's journey to self-awareness is told through a series of episodic events, such as the suicide of his best friend, his growing infatuation with a local team's soccer star, a car accident and subsequent hospitalisation which uncomfortably reunites him with his parents. At the end of the film he realizes that he can be his own person and he recites a list of things he will never do in order to fit in and belong.

== Cast ==
- Pierre Chatagny as Loïc
- Natacha Koutchoumov as Marie
- Rui Pedro Alves as Rui
- Lionel Baier as Lionel

== Reception ==
A review for Abus de Ciné found the film "appalling".
