= Late Bloomers (2006 film) =

- Directed by: Bettina Oberli
- Screenplay by: Bettina Oberli; Sabine Pochhammer
- Produced by: Alfi Sinniger
- Starring: Stephanie Glaser; Annemarie Düringer; Monica Gubser; Heidi Maria Glössner; Hanspeter Müller-Drossaart
- Cinematography: Stéphane Kuthy
- Edited by: Michael Schaerer
- Music by: Luk Zimmermann
- Release date: August 2006
- Country: Switzerland
- Language: Swiss German

Late Bloomers (German: Die Herbstzeitlosen) is a 2006 Swiss German-language comedy film directed by Bettina Oberli and starring Stephanie Glaser. It follows an elderly seamstress who opens a lingerie boutique in her Emmental village, causing unrest. The film was Switzerland's submission for the Academy Award for Best Foreign Language Film at the 80th Academy Awards, and Annemarie Düringer won Best Actress at the Geneva International Film Festival in 2006.

== Synopsis ==
After the death of her husband, Martha withdraws from the Sunday card games in the Emmental village of Trub, worrying her friends Lisi, Hanni, and Frieda. In an effort to cheer her up, they suggest that she pursue a long-held dream, leading the eighty-year-old seamstress to open a lingerie boutique. The venture causes a stir in the village and disrupts its social routine.

== Cast ==
The cast includes:

- Stephanie Glaser as Martha Jost
- Hanspeter Müller-Drossaart as Walter Jost
- Heidi Maria Glössner as Lisi Bigler
- Lilian Naef as Vreni Jost
- Annemarie Düringer as Frieda Eggenschwyler
- Monika Niggeler as Shirley Bigler
- Monica Gubser as Hanni Bieri
- Manfred Liechti as Fritz Bieri
- Peter Wyssbrod as Ernst Bieri
- Alice Brüngger as Lotte

== Production ==
Bettina Oberli based Martha partly on her grandmother. Early drafts of the screenplay had Martha opening a café rather than a lingerie boutique. Filming took place in the Emmental, where production was disrupted after flooding damaged the main road below Trub.

== Reception ==
=== Awards and recognition ===
The film was Switzerland's submission for the Academy Award for Best Foreign Language Film at the 80th Academy Awards, but it did not advance to the shortlist. At the Geneva International Film Festival in 2006, Annemarie Düringer won the Prix Swissperform de la meilleure interprétation féminine, and the film won the Prix Walo for Best Film Production in Zurich in 2006. It was nominated for Best Foreign-Language Film at the 8th AARP Movies for Grownups Awards, where it lost to The Edge of Heaven.

=== Critical response ===
Filmdienst described the film as a Swiss German comedy that avoided the clichés and broad sentimentality of the traditional Heimatfilm and became a charming plea for dignity and joie de vivre in old age.

== Festival screenings ==
The film premiered in August 2006. It was later screened at festivals including Der Neue Heimatfilm in August 2007, the Osaka European Film Festival in November 2007, the Palm Springs International Film Festival in January 2008, the Seattle International Film Festival in May 2008, the Shanghai International Film Festival in June 2008, and the Solothurn Film Festival in January 2015.

== See also ==
- Cinema of Switzerland
- List of submissions to the 80th Academy Awards for Best Foreign Language Film
- List of Swiss submissions for the Academy Award for Best Foreign Language Film
