= Christian Kohlund =

Swiss actor and director (born 1950)

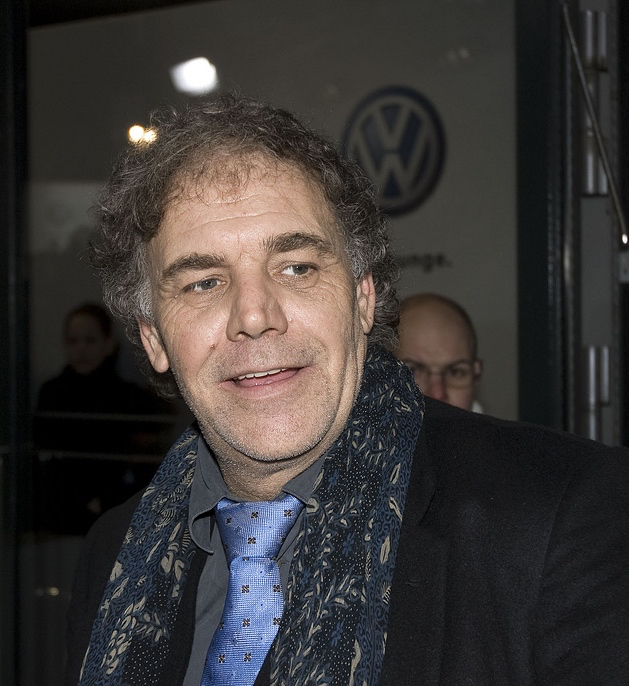
Christian Kohlund, Volkswagen People’s Night

Christian Kohlund (born 17 August 1950 in Basel, Switzerland) is a Swiss actor and director.

== Selected filmography ==
- The Cheese Factory in the Hamlet (1958), as School boy
- The Pedestrian (1973), as Erwin Gotz
- Die Brücke von Zupanja (1975), as Oberfeldwebel Schuster
- The Chinese Miracle (1977), as Dr. Kristian Keller
- Disorder and Early Torment (1977), as Max Hergesell
- Abelard (1977), as Georg Rauh
- Derrick - Season 5, Episode 2: "Tod eines Fans" (1978, TV), as Konrad Peiss
- La Nouvelle Malle des Indes (1981, TV miniseries), as Thomas Waghorn
- Derrick - Season 12, Episode 1: "Der Mann aus Antibes" (1985, TV), as Bondeck
- Girl in a Boot (1985), as Thomas Stauffer
- The Black Forest Clinic (1986–1989, TV series, 35 episodes), as Prof. Alexander Vollmers
- Leo Sonnyboy (1989), as Adrian Hauser
- Bony (1992, TV series, 13 episodes), as Detective Sergeant Frank Fisher
- By Way of the Stars (1992, TV miniseries), as Karl Bienmann
- Abraham (1993, TV film), as Eshkol
- Anna Maria – Eine Frau geht ihren Weg (1994–1996, TV series, 33 episodes), as Alexander Langer
- Sun on the Stubble (1996, TV miniseries), as Marcus Gunther
- Nancherrow (1999, TV film), as Nikko Bernhoffer
- Alarm für Cobra 11 (1999, TV series, 2 episodes), as Carlos Berger
- Jesus (1999, TV film), as Caiaphas
- The Apocalypse (2002, TV film), as Quintus Maximus, a general
- Julius Caesar (2003, TV miniseries), as Lepidus
- Das Traumhotel (2004–2014, TV series, 20 episodes), as Markus Winter
- Der Zürich-Krimi (since 2016, TV series, 17 episodes), as Thomas Borchert
