= Walo Lüönd =

Swiss actor (1927–2012)

Walo Lüönd (1974)

Walo Lüönd (born 13 April 1927 in Zug, died 17 June 2012 in Locarno) was a Swiss movie actor, best known for his role in the movie The Swissmakers (Die Schweizermacher) along with comedian Emil Steinberger. He has had roles in 102 films and television shows.

He had been married to Eva-Maria Bendig since 1957; they have two children, Daniel (1957-1987) and Oliver (b. 1958).

He died on 17 June 2012, at the age of 85 in a hospital in Locarno, Ticino, due to pneumonia after suffering a hip fracture in his residence in Losone. His funeral took place on Tuesday, 26 June, in Untersiggenthal in the canton of Aargau.

== Filmography ==
Year	Title	Role	Notes
1952	Palace Hotel	Hotelpage	Uncredited
1962	Café Oriental	Ludwig	
1962	The Invisible Dr. Mabuse	Kriminalbeamter Hase	
1962	The Phone Rings Every Night	Steward Jan Piepenbrink	
1965	Die Schlüssel	Inspektor Lang	TV Mini-Series, 2 episodes
1970	Dällebach Kari	Karl Dällenbach	
1972	Der Fall	Alfons Grendelmann	
1973	Die Fabrikanten	Otmar Nef	
1975	De Grotzepuur	Schäggel der Knecht	
1976	Riedland	Backpfiff	
1977	Die Konsequenz	Giorgio Manzoni, der Vater	
1978	The Swissmakers	Max Bodmer	
1979	Bread and Stones	Bodenbauer	
1979	Grauzone	Nachtwächter	
1980	The Inventor	Otti	
1981	Völlerei oder Inselfest (Todsünde 4)	Geeni Weber	
1981	Seuls	Laval	
1981	Fire and Sword	Gorvenal	
1983	Die schwarze Spinne	Rüedu	
1983	Hunderennen	Herr Wälti	
1983	Teddy Bär	Otmar Fischli	
1984	Knock on the Wrong Door	Landlord	
1984	L'air du crime	L'homme du bateau	
1985	Crooks in Paradise	Emil Bächerli	TV film
1985	Girl in a Boot	Generalkonsul	
1986	Lisi und der General	General	
1988	Der Experte	Horst Neumann	
1988	Goldjunge	Herr Troller	
1994	Pumuckl und der blaue Klabauter	Kapitän	
1997	Irrlichter	Sepp Tresch	
2000	Komiker	Alois Bissinger	
2001	Meine polnische Jungfrau		
2001	Escape to Paradise		
2004	Sternenberg	Hans Grob	
2004	Welcome to Switzerland	Adolf Sempach	
2010	The Day of the Cat	Schneider Feinstein	(final film role)
