= Museum of Communication (Bern) =

Interactive museum in Switzerland

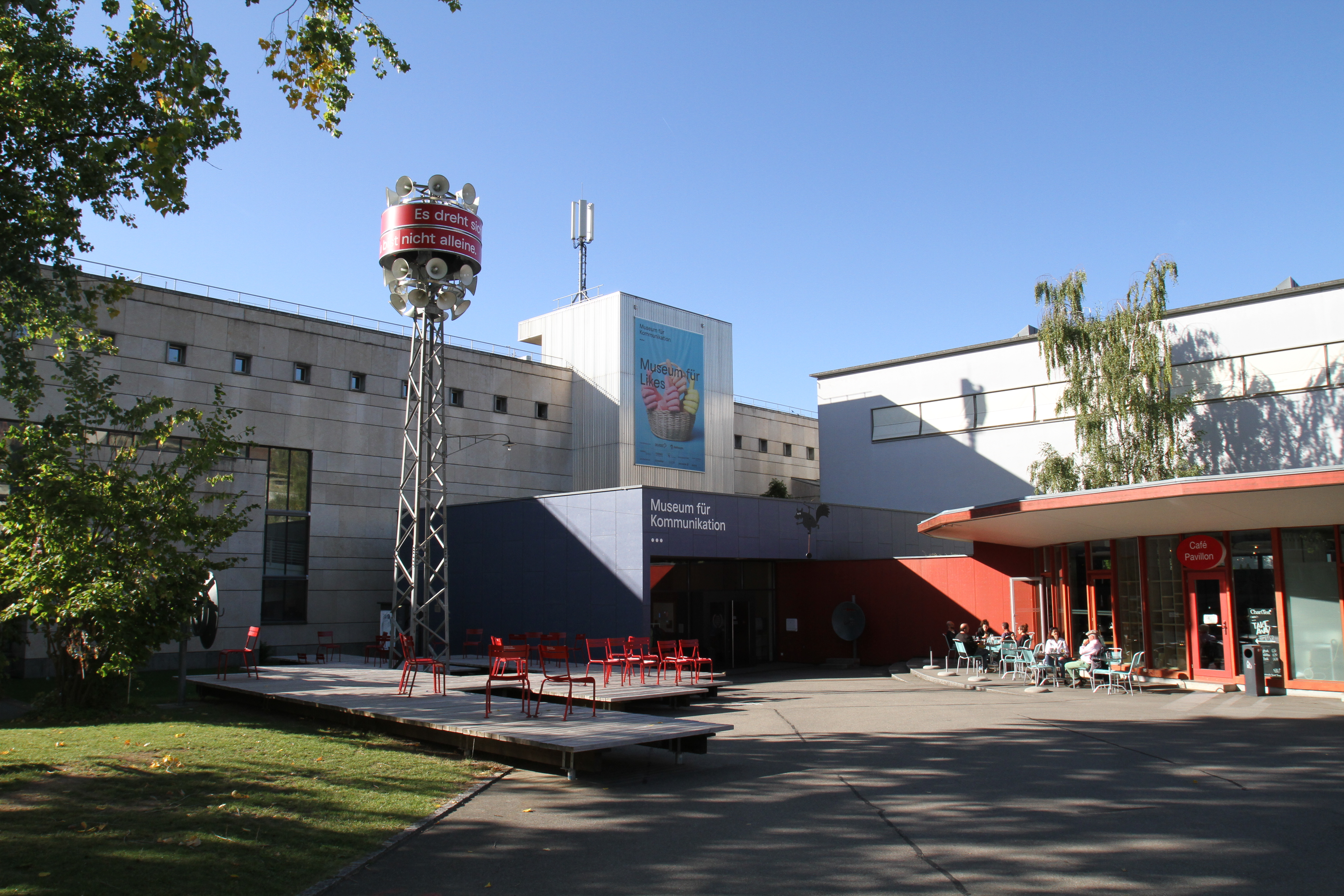
- Established: 1893 / 1990 / 2017
- Location: Helvetiastrasse 16, 3000 Bern, Switzerland
- Coordinates: 46°56′30″N 7°27′00″E
- Type: Telecommunications, Post, Philately, Radio and Television
- Visitors: 100 000 annually
- Director: Jacqueline Strauss
- Architect: Andrea Roost
- Owner: Schweizerische Stiftung für die Geschichte der Post und Telekommunikation
- Website: mfk.ch/en

The Museum of Communication is an interactive museum dedicated to the subject of communication in Bern, Switzerland. In 2019 it was awarded the Council of Europe Museum Prize. It was founded in 1907 as the corporate museum of Swiss Post (later called PTT), the national postal service of Switzerland. The restructuring of the museum into a foundation of Swiss Post and Swisscom led to a broadening of the overall theme and a new name, the Museum of Communication. The latest incarnation of the museum, which opened its doors with a redesigned permanent exhibition in 2017, is focused completely on its visitors.

== Temporary exhibitions ==
Ever since it moved to its first purpose-built location in 1990, the Museum of Communication has regularly staged temporary exhibitions. The exhibitions address the social and cultural impact of communication and communication technology and also delve a little deeper into certain rather surprising aspects of communication. In recent years they have included the role of inhibitions, the art of growing old or the challenges and potential capacities of silence. Entitled "Sounds of Silence", this particular exhibition won several international awards, including the iF Design Award by the iF Industrie Forum Design. The initial output of three to four temporary exhibitions every year was later reduced to one or two.

== Core exhibition ==
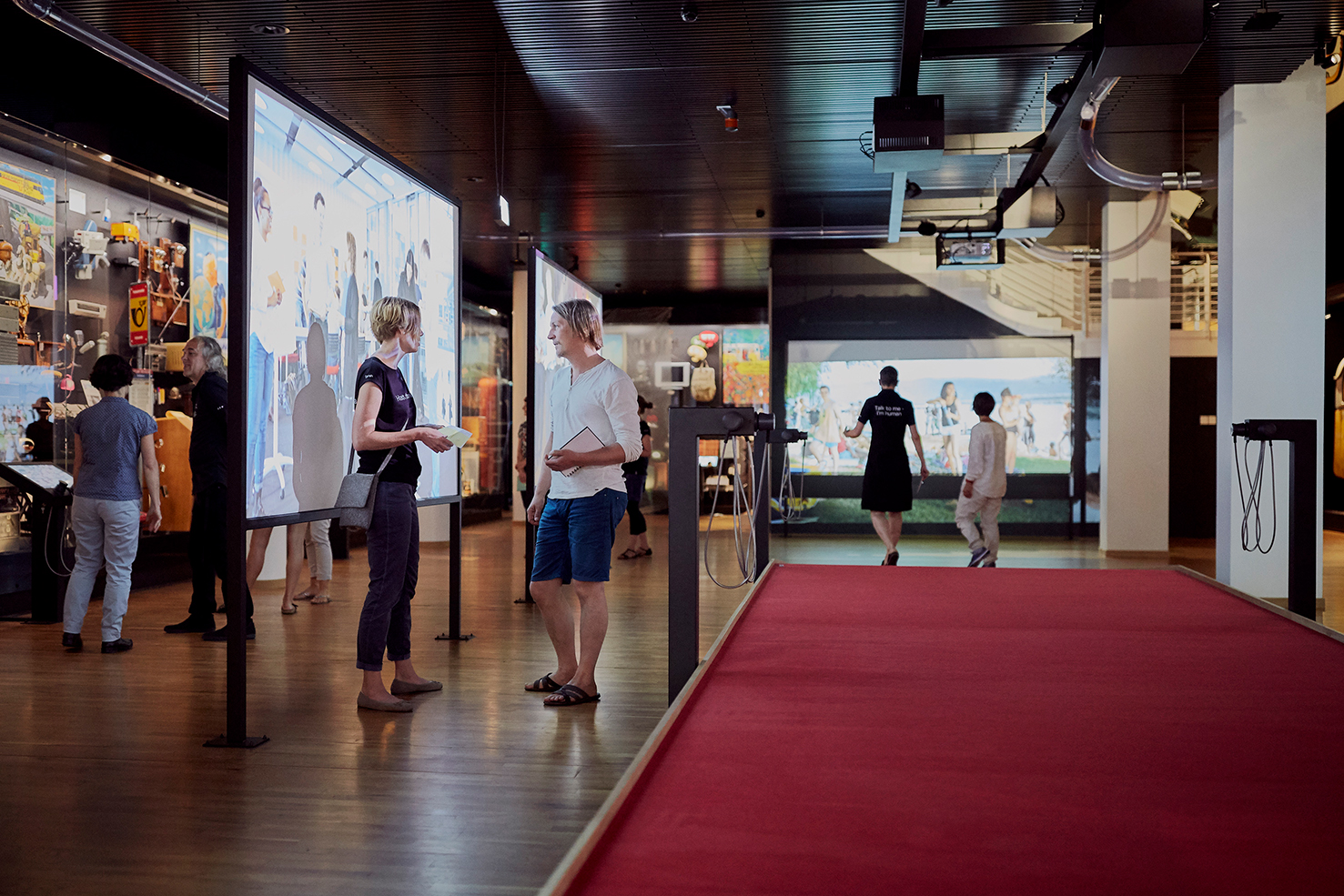
Red carpet in the core exhibition, which opened in 2017

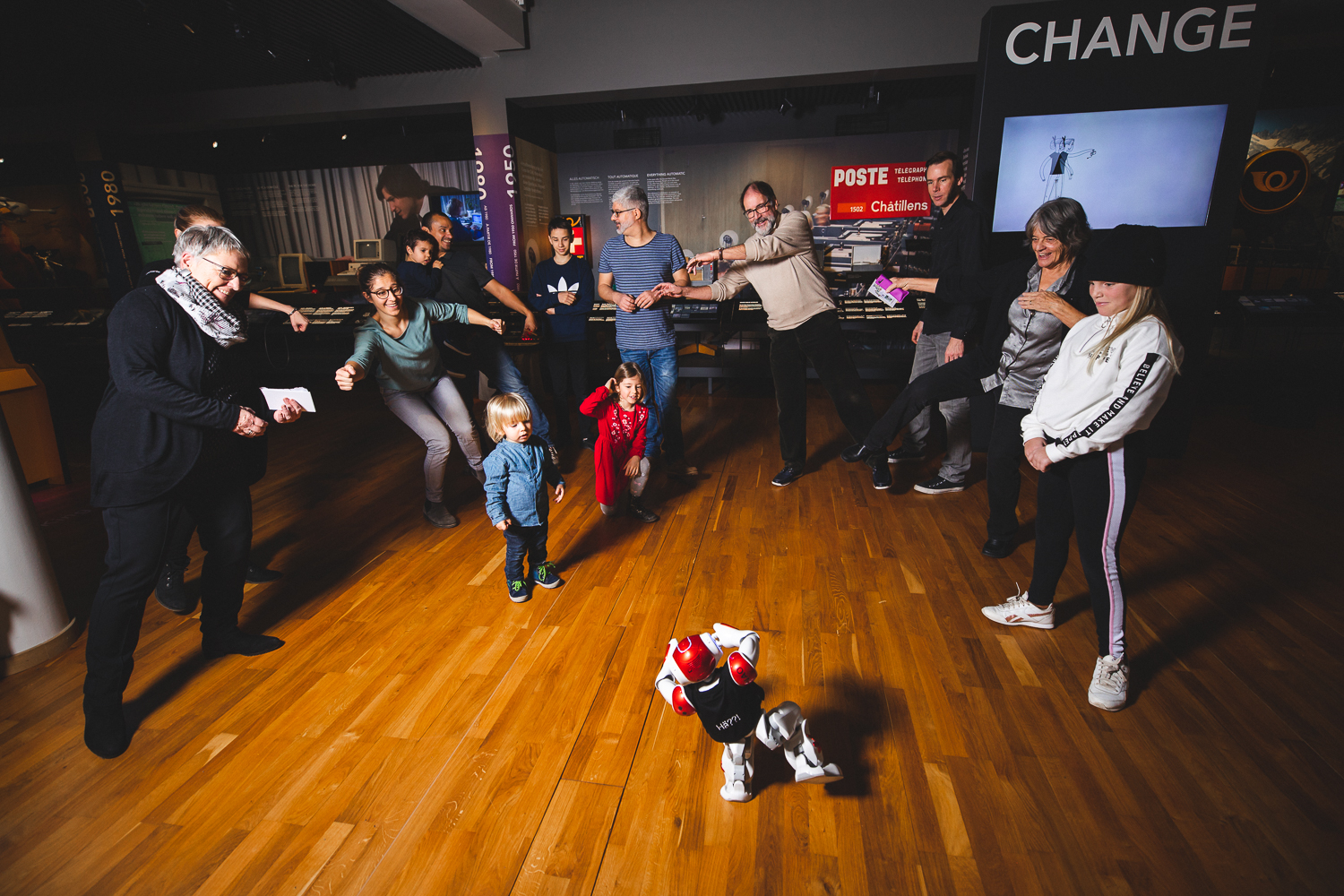
Visitors doing Tai Chi with "Nao" the robot

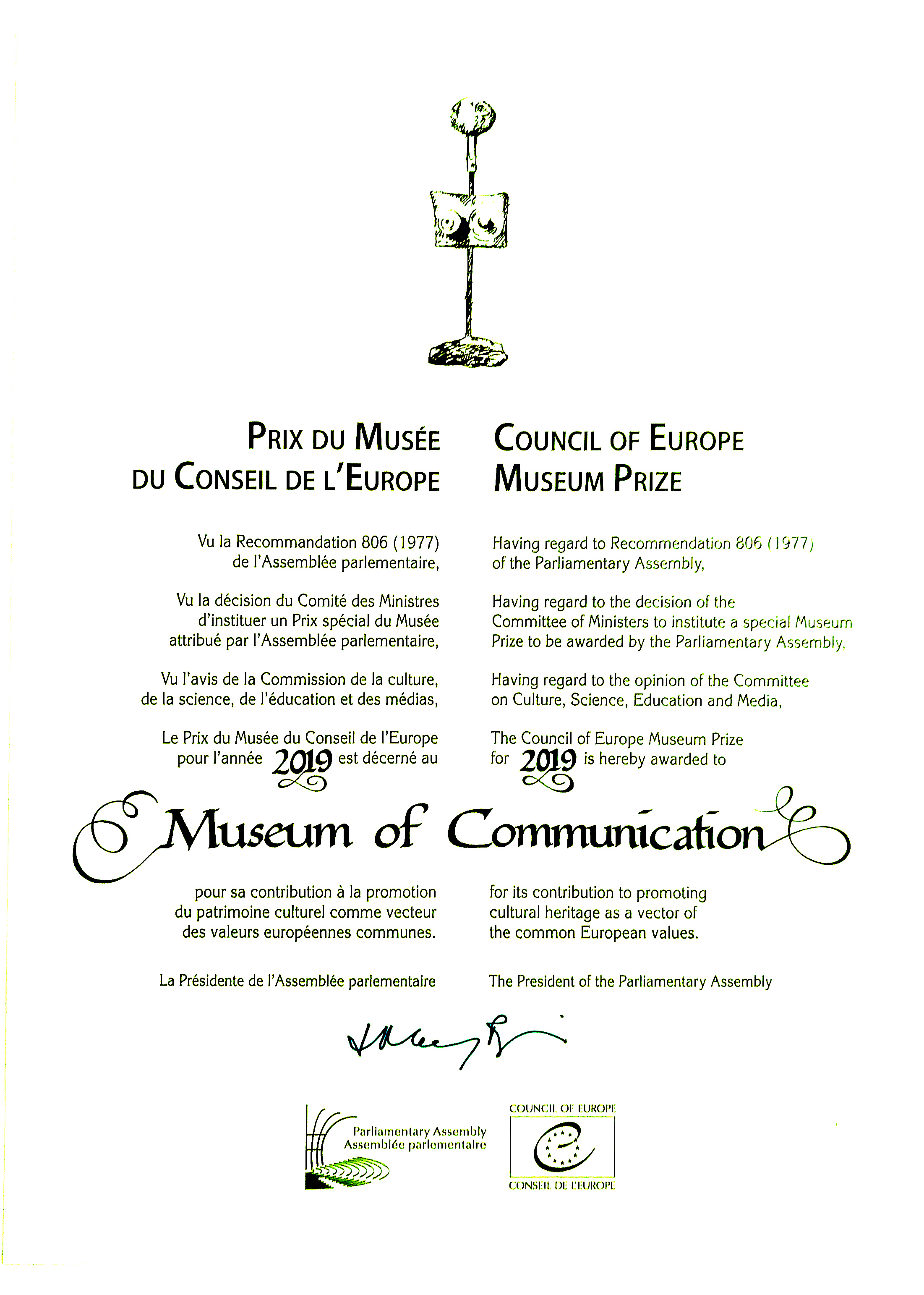
Certificate of the Council of Europe Museum Prize

Following a period of renovation which lasted a year, the Museum of Communication Bern celebrated the reopening of its permanent exhibition on 17 August 2017. The new core exhibition allows visitors to experience the omnipresence of communication, both in analogue and in digital form, in an entertaining way. Face-to-face encounters, experiments and an easy-to-understand design take centre stage. Additional information on the themes addressed in the exhibition is also conveyed by communicators who are present at all times, and by encouraging the visitors to interact with each other. The communicators are not like ordinary museum assistants, but rather engage in direct dialogue with visitors. In 2019, the Museum of Communication was awarded the Council of Europe Museum Prize for its overall interactive concept and staff-centred communication.

== Evolution of permanent exhibitions ==
=== Post Museum and PTT Museum as corporate museums ===
Ever since the first museum was established in 1907, it has staged its own permanent exhibitions. After a phase of adding to the collection in the main post office building in Bern and then a period of closure due to the mobilisation during the First World War, the collection of stamps on display were mainly of interest to philatelists.

After moving to the new building of the Swiss Alpine Museum, the management decided to add more "current relevance and practical value to the Post Museum" and to design a more modern exhibition which, until the Second World War broke out, attracted some 12,000 visitors annually.

After the war, the museum reverted to normal opening hours and resumed its research and collection work. It also participated in shop-window exhibitions in various parts of the country and at regional fairs and cultural events. This had a positive impact on the museum's public awareness and on its visitor numbers.

The idea behind the PTT Museum, which was housed in a new building constructed specifically for the purpose, was to combine the three main exhibition themes and allow visitors to experience them as a whole: postal history, the history of telecommunications and the stamp collection. The aim of the new museum was to "paint an holistic and comprehensive picture of the PTT as a conveyer of communications". The intention was that the exhibition would be informative and easy to understand, even for laypeople. The exhibits were displayed in their relevant social setting and the idea was to "present them in a well-thought-out and educational way, grouped according to a number of well-structured central themes". Moreover, visitors were given the opportunity to take an active part in simulated real-life situations. This included interactive exhibits on letter writing and simulations of senders and recipients.

=== Museum of Communication as a theme-based museum ===
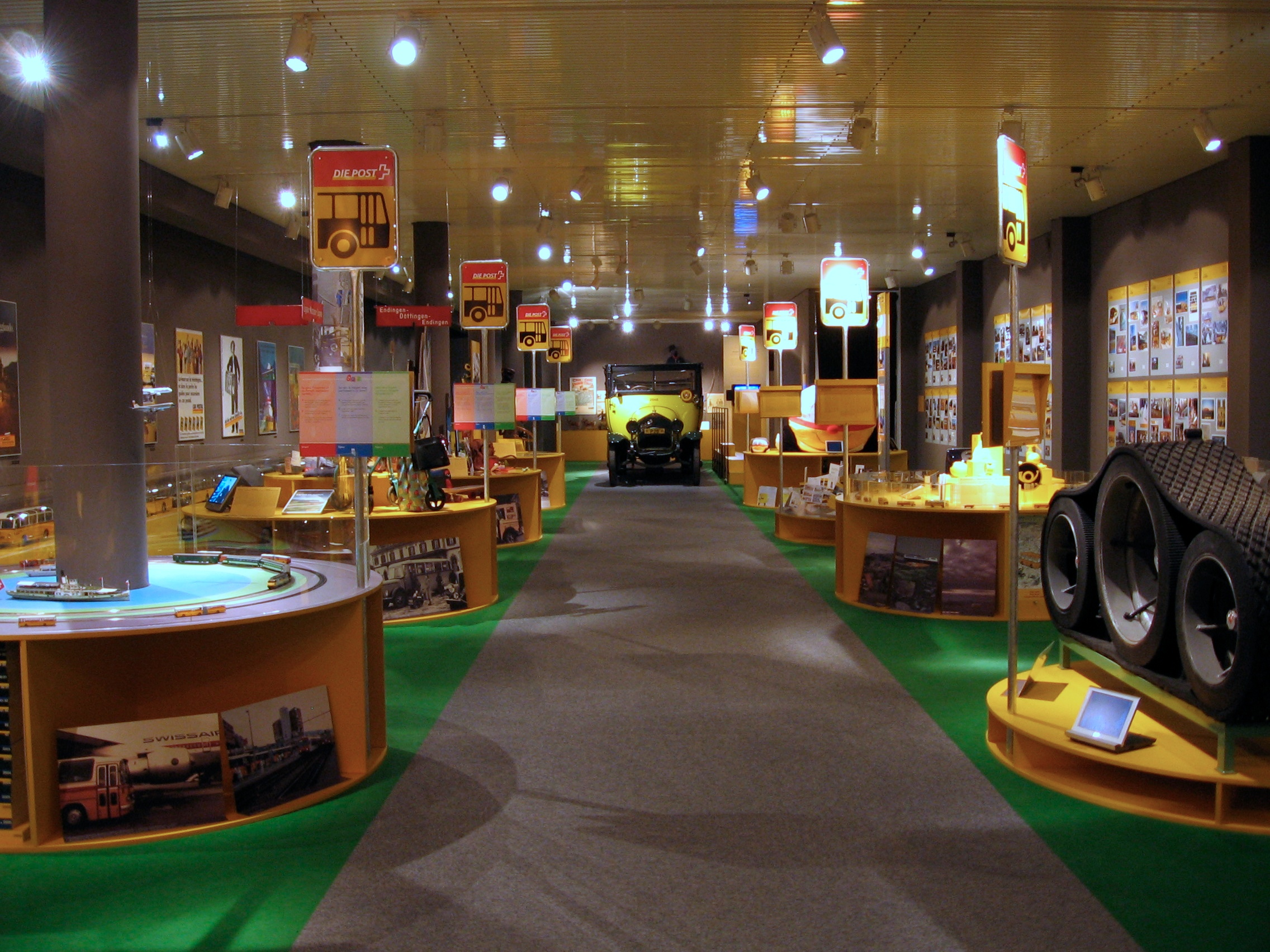
Exhibition on the history of the postal service, 2006

In 1997, the museum's legal framework was changed to that of a nonprofit foundation and it was renamed the Museum of Communication. It was now independent and the new name also made it possible to show the exhibits from the historical collection in a wider thematic and chronological context under the overall topic of communication.

A year later, the board signed off on a basic concept for the new exhibition which would involve visitors taking an active part in museum events. The aim was to feature not just rational topics but also emotional experiences and insights. In 1999, the Museum of Communication Bern welcomed 36,297 visitors.

The new concept was put in place from the year 2000 onwards. The museum was extended in several stages to include a room for events, a café and a shop. The first part of the three-part permanent exhibition opened its doors in 2003 under the title "Adventures in Communication", which was later changed to "Near and far: People and their media".

The other two parts of the permanent exhibition opened in 2007 under the titles: "As Time Goes Byte: Computers and digital culture" and "Images that stick: the world of postage stamps". This concluded the overall renewal of the museum and "Adventures in Communication" was made the overall motto of the multipart permanent exhibition. Visitor numbers were now for the first time reaching the 80,000 mark.

The preparatory work for a complete overhaul of the museum concept began in 2012. The aim was to create an interactive, up-to-date Museum of Communication and, after a year-long closure for renovation work, the new core exhibition opened its doors in 2017.

Since that time, visitor numbers have significantly increased. In 2019, the Museum of Communication welcomed a total of 115,664 visitors. Over the space of 20 years, visitor numbers had more than tripled.

In order to live up to the expectations of a society in technological flux, a digital strategy was developed in 2019. With an emphasis on maintaining a digital presence, a culture of participation and a cultural memory, it aims to make the museum and its strengths accessible within the digital space.

== History, architecture, locations ==
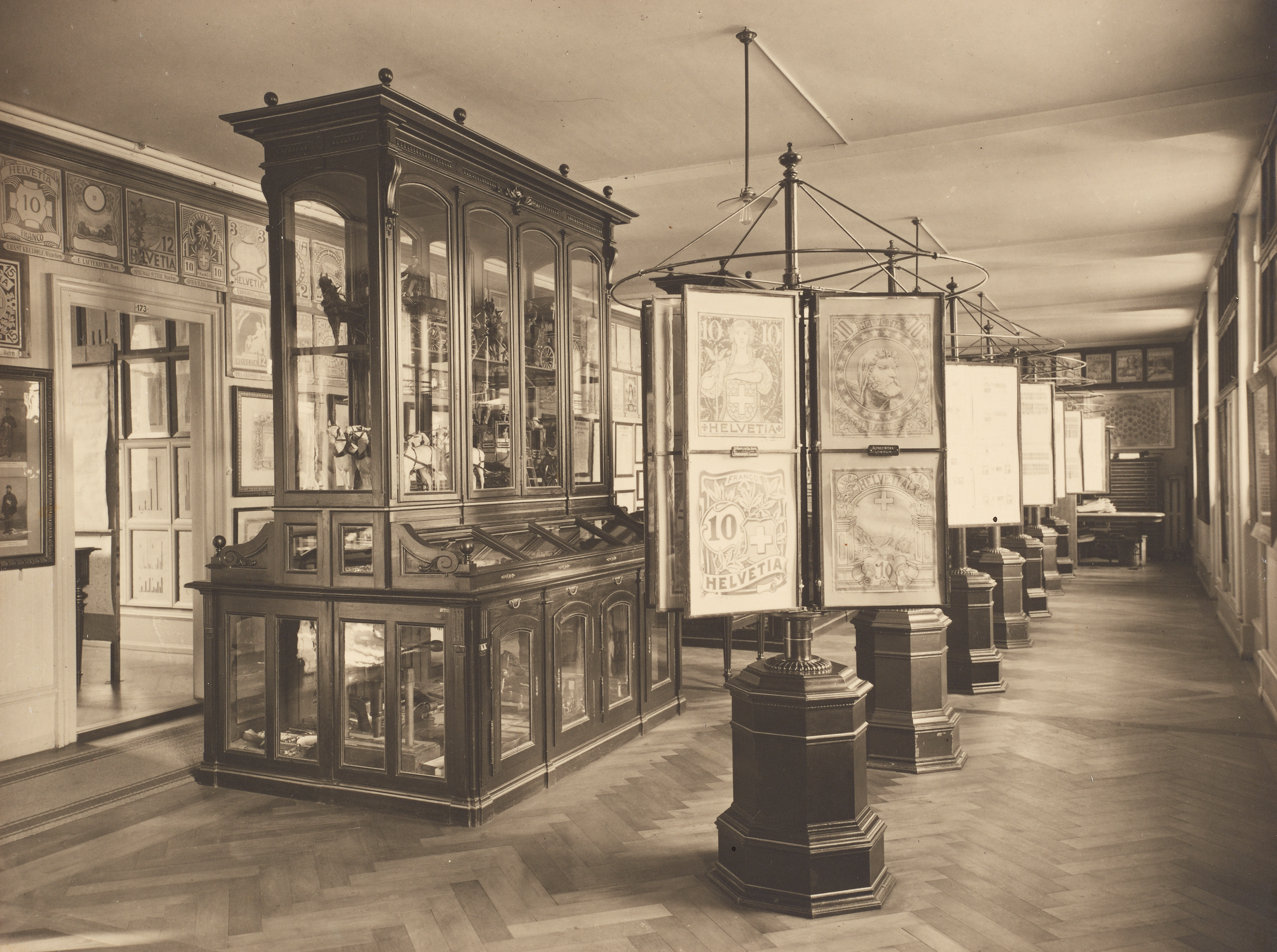
Post Museum at Bollwerk III, established in 1907

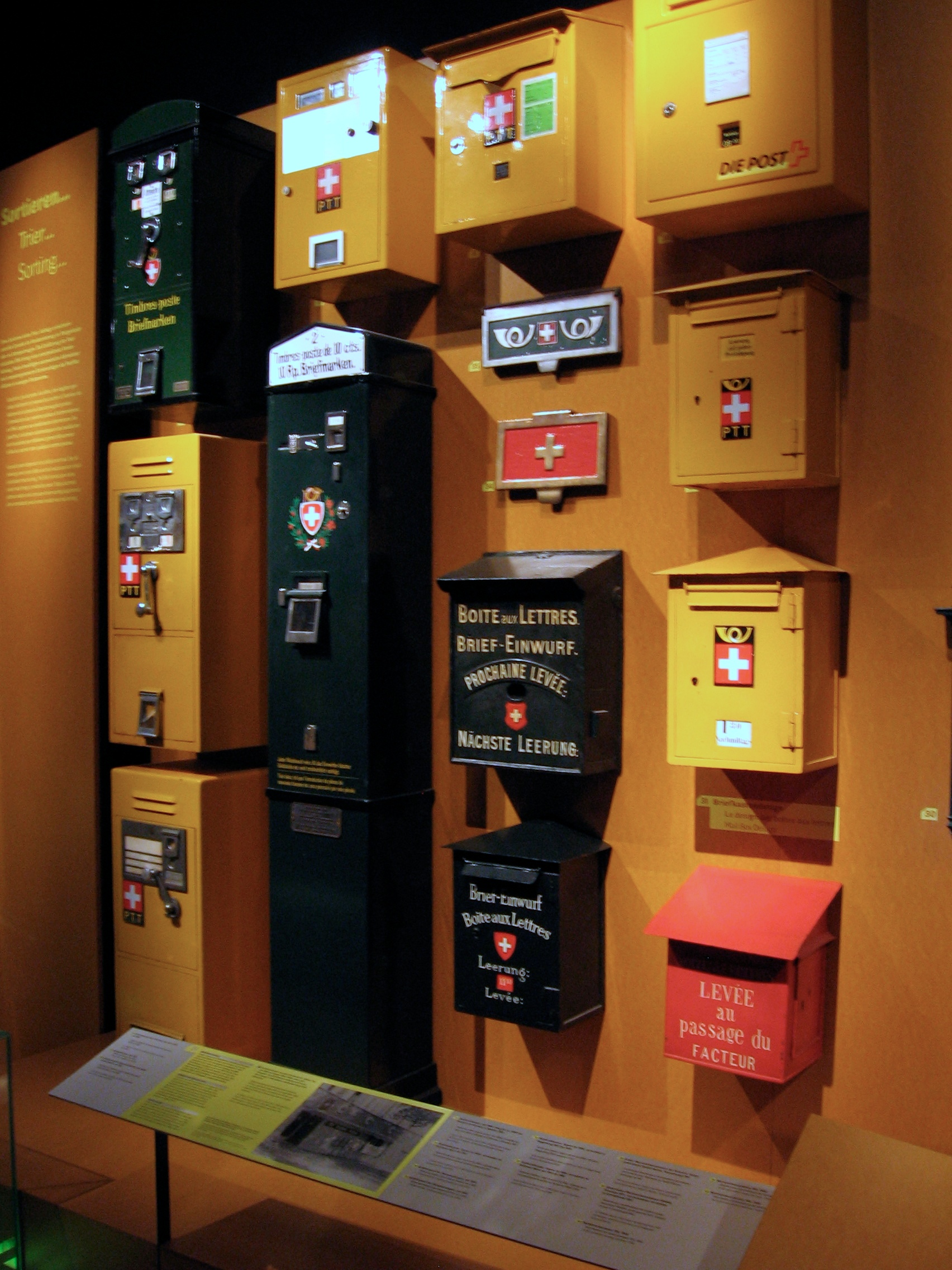
Before yellow became the Swiss Post colour, letter boxes were green.

In 1901, Anton Säger, the Chief Executive Director of the Swiss postal service issued an order that objects and documents relating to the postal service should be collected. In his former role as Chief Postal Inspector he had already instructed staff in 1893 to "maintain an archive and postal museum". The Post Museum eventually opened its doors at the main post office building at Bollwerk in Bern in 1907.

The Post Museum was later taken over by the PTT. Because the telephone switchboard at Bollwerk had to be extended, the museum moved to the ground floor of the new Swiss Alpine Museum on Helvetiaplatz in 1933. The Alpine Museum building in the then still relatively new Kirchenfeld quarter of Bern was an example of the Neues Bauen style. In 1949, the Post Museum was renamed the PTT Museum. Because its collection was constantly expanding and the Alpine Museum required more and more space, the PTT Museum began to search for a new home.

When the Burgergemeinde and the municipality and Canton of Bern developed plans to build a heritage protection centre in the Kirchenfeld area, of which only a small part was ultimately realised, a new purpose-built PTT Museum finally became a reality and in 1990 it moved to the building designed by architect Andrea Roost on Helvetiastrasse in the Kirchenfeld quarter, where it is still located today.

In the course of the liberalisation of the telecommunications market, the PTT was divided into Swiss Post AG and Swisscom AG in 1997. Together, the two companies decided to establish the Schweizerische Stiftung für die Geschichte der Post und Telekommunikation. The PTT Museum was expanded from a corporate museum to a theme-based museum and was given its current name, the Museum of Communications.

In 1998, the foundation was tasked with maintaining the PTT Archive on behalf of Swiss Post and Swisscom. The archive itself is housed not at the museum, but in Köniz near Bern. In 1999, the former Shortwave transmitter Schwarzenburg was added to the museum and is now also being used as a museum depot. Before that, the museum's cultural heritage objects were stored in several smaller depots in various locations. In 2013, the depot in Schwarzenburg was extended by adding a timber structure designed by Patrick Thurston. The timber extension itself was awarded the 2015 Prix Lignum in gold.

The idea of creating a museum quarter in the Kirchenfeld area became more realistic in 2019. Since its establishment in the early 20th centuryuni, the quarter has been home to several ostentatious buildings and a multitude of Bern museums. The new plan envisages linking the different cultural institutions both spatially and with regard to their contents, thereby creating a cohesive educational and cultural quarter.

== Collections ==
The current collection of the Museum of Communication represents a record of the evolution of communication. The focus is on the history of the media and their interactions with Swiss society. It not only includes technological artefacts but also highlights their associated cultural techniques, processes and stories. The PTT Archive of administrative documents places the collection in a wider context. It is of national importance and is divided into the following areas:

=== Post and transport history ===
Children's post office

The foundation stone for today's Museum of Communication was laid in 1893, when the Swiss postal service decided to collect historical objects for a future Post Museum. From the very beginning, the goal was to document the changes in the Swiss postal service from its inception to the present. A number of objects from various post offices, uniforms, items from the Swiss National Exhibitions in 1883 in Zurich and in 1896 in Geneva, as well as a modest collection of stamps formed the core of the initial collection.

In conjunction with the postal system, a national network of public transport was also set up. Because the railway system was still in its infancy when the postal service was established, carrying passengers became one of its main tasks in the beginning. This led to the accumulation of a postal transport history collection.

By transporting and conveying messages, goods, money and people, the postal service transcended space and time. More than 10,000 objects represent the various periods and modes of transportation and communication. The post and transport history collection also includes objects from the areas of travel and tourism.

=== Information and communications technology ===
When the post and telegraph services merged to form the Postal Telegraph and Telephone Agency (PTT) in 1920, the collection was extended by the objects from the merging administrations. When the Post Museum became the PTT Museum in 1949, the telegraphy and telephony artefacts from the collection were incorporated into the new museum.

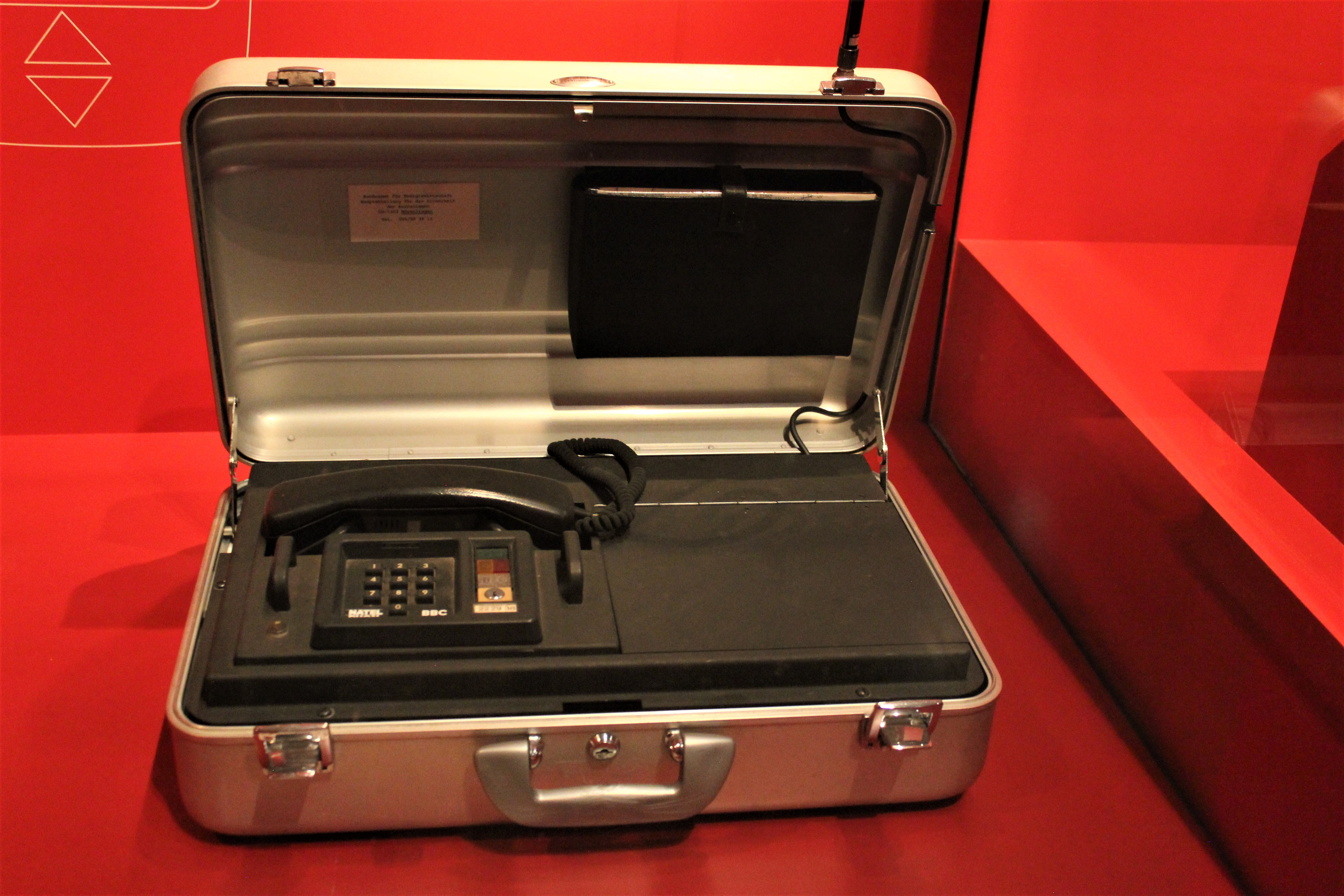
An early mobile telephone, the Natel A

The telephony and telegraphy sections of the collection have in recent times been further expanded; telex, fax and videotex (text on screen) exhibits were added to the telegraphy section and mobile telephony to the telephony collection. The holdings cover the main phase of development in each technology up to its final stage or the present. Morse telegraphs are among the oldest objects in this part of the collection, which also includes more than 1,500 telephones from all eras and various technologies up to today's smartphones with touchscreens. The objects mainly derived from the PTT companies and their successors, Telecom PTT and Swisscom. Objects from the company Ascom Holding AG were added in 2007. The museum specifically collects objects and documents on the use and reception history of the different types of technology.

Four completely preserved automatic switchboards and their original buildings are a special part of the collection. They are being maintained by the museum as in situ objects.

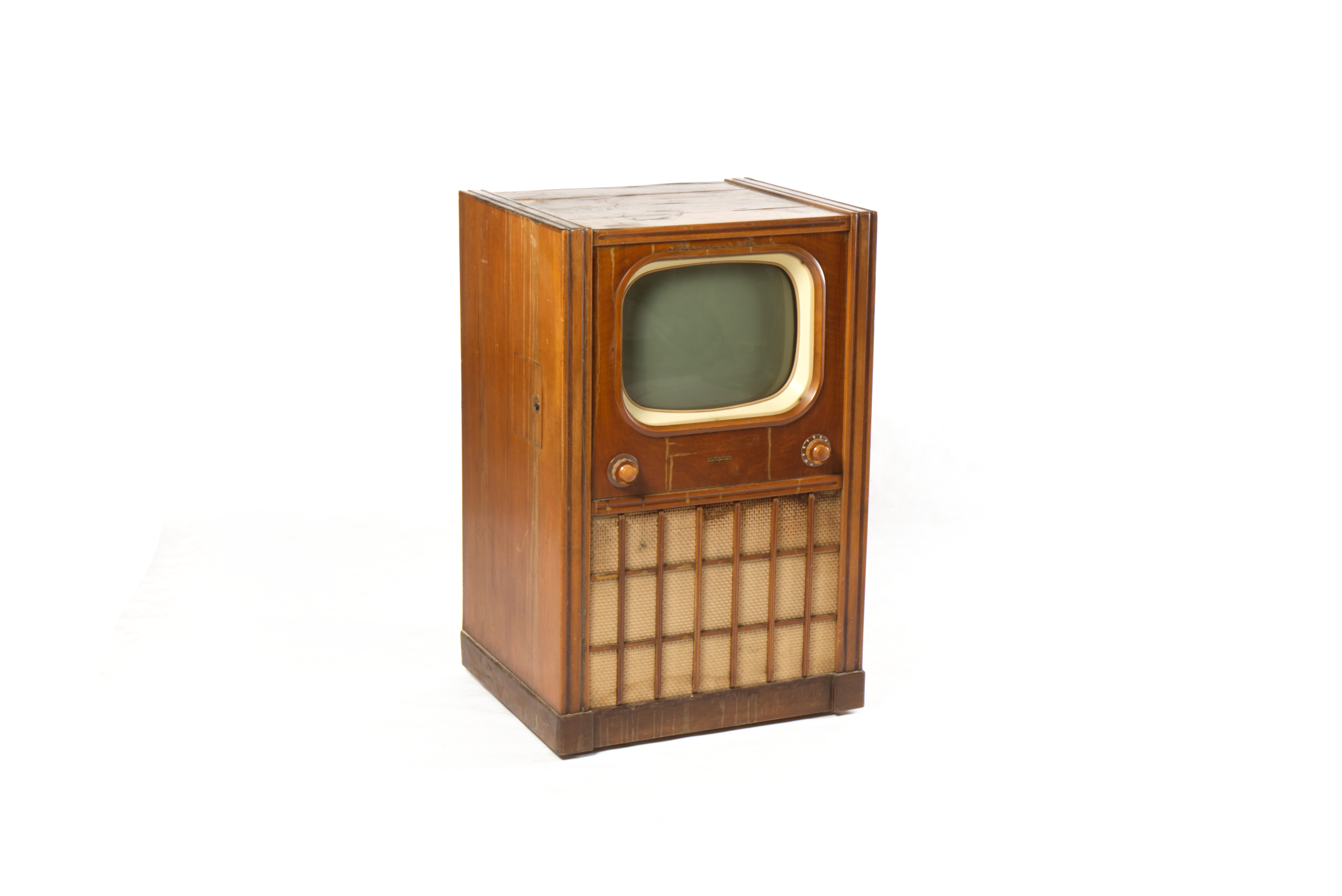
Television receiver La Dôle by the Swiss Company Autophon (1953/1954)

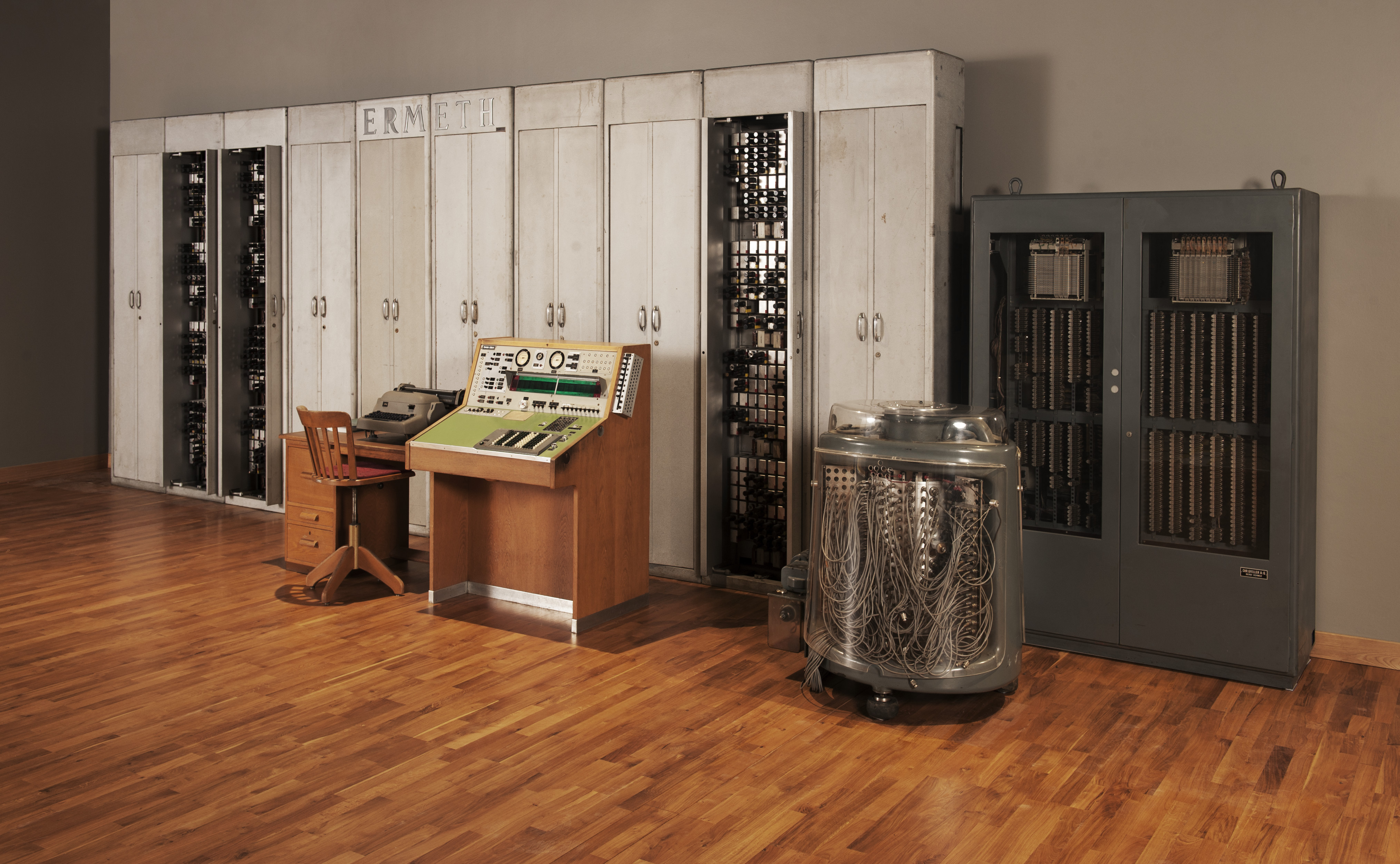
Electronic calculating machine ERMETH developed by ETH Zurich

From 1923, the PTT transmitted radio programmes and television programmes were also broadcast from 1953. From the establishment of the Swiss Broadcasting Corporation (SRG) in 1931 until the end of the 1980s, the PTT was also responsible for the procurement and maintenance of the studio equipment. As a consequence, the collection also includes 200 television sets and some 1,000 radios. The holdings cover the first 40 years of Swiss radio history and the early days of Swiss Television broadcasting. An agreement with SRG SSR idée suisse ensures the continuation of the collection of objects from radio and television studios.

The private companies that operate in Switzerland also feature in the collection. On the one hand it documents the technological advances, on the other it maintains the audio-visual cultural heritage of Switzerland in the museum's own collections and makes them accessible to a wider audience.

The collection highlights the evolution of computer engineering from the mid-20th century up to the present day. Until the establishment of the foundation in 1997, the IT collection was part of the telecommunications holdings and mainly included mainframe computers from the Swiss PTT companies. Once the museum's own collection had been created, the IT collection was gradually expanded.

=== Paper, photographs, and audio-visual media ===
The paper, photographs & audio-visual media collection includes 500,000 photographs, 5,000 digital and analogue videos and films as well as the audio and graphic design holdings consisting of posters, graphic designs, maps, technical plans and diagrams. It mainly comprises the archives of the PTT (today's Swiss Post and Swisscom) and other institutions and of private donations. Since the foundation was established, additions to the holdings are strictly limited to objects and works that relate to the museum's core themes.

The Museum of Communication has a unique picture archive that has continued to grow for more than a century. Since the founding of the museum, the "photo library" has included a visual record of the history of Post and PTT. It also contains individual collections of Swiss institutions and photographers. The total photographic heritage of the Museum of Communication comprises approximately 500,000 pictures. Some 60,000 of them have already been made accessible on the museum's online database (as of 2021). The museum houses and maintains the most important collection of photographic records of the Swiss post and telecommunications service, both past and present. The holdings also contain photographic records of national relevance on the history of road and rail traffic, travel and tourism and of Alpine mountaineering. More recent collections cover the history of electronic mass media such as radio and television, electronic data processing and personal computing. The photographic collection of the Museum of Communication is part of the Swiss collective memory and the country's cultural heritage. A comprehensive long-term project launched in 2019 aims to preventively conserve and digitalise the photographic collection, thereby making it accessible to all.

=== Art ===
The art collection of the Museum of Communication in Bern presents its core theme from the perspective of art. It can be roughly divided into three areas. Firstly it contains works of visual arts, which relate to the museum's core themes and were collected from the very beginning. A second group (since 1998) comprises works of contemporary art whose contents or media relate to the topic of communication. The art collection is not part of the traditional core holdings of the museum but is actively maintained because it raises questions concerning communication and because it can be used to convey complex issues related to the topic. The third collection comprises mail art. The museum has collected works from this global art movement since 1990. Thanks to the addition of the archives of Swiss artists H.R. Fricker and Marcel Stüssi, a representative collection with an emphasis on Swiss works has been built up.

=== Philately ===
The stamps room in the Post Museum

The Museum of Communication has one of the largest collections of stamps worldwide. It comprises some three million postage stamps and has been part of the museum's core holdings since the foundation was first established. It includes a valuable collection of Swiss postage stamps such as the Zürich 4 and Zürich 6, the Double Geneva and the Basel Dove. The collection mainly contains all postage stamps issued in Switzerland since they were first introduced in 1843. There is also a representative selection of stamps from all over the world. In 1874 the World Postal Union was established in Bern. Its purpose was to coordinate the postal communication between different countries. The postage stamps provided to the World Postal Union by its member states, which now number 192, are also part of the museum's philately collection.

Other specimens include drafts of stamps, die proofs, objects related to the production of stamps, mail and collector's items.

== See also ==
- PTT Archive
- List of museums in Bern
- List of museums in Switzerland
