= Emil Steinberger (actor) =

Swiss comedian, writer, director and actor (born 1933)

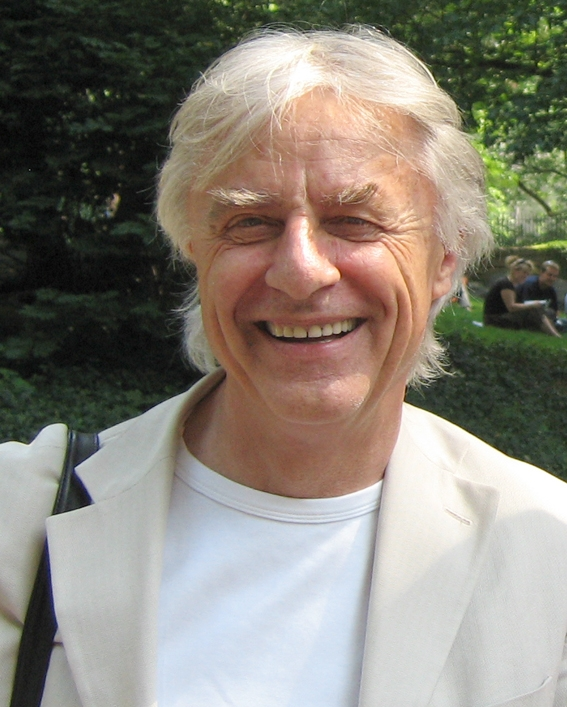
- Born: Emil Steinberger; 6 January 1933 (age 93); Lucerne, Lucerne, Switzerland
- Occupations: Cabaret artist, author, film director and actor
- Years active: 1967 - present
- Spouses: Maya Rudin (m. 1966; div. 1989) Nicole 'Niccel' Kristuf (m. 1999)
- Children: 2
- Website: emil.ch

Emil Steinberger (born 6 January 1933), commonly known as Emil, is a Swiss comedian, writer, director and actor. He is predominantly known as a comedian and actor in Switzerland, Germany and Austria. He lived in New York City from 1993 to 1999, which inspired him for his book Emil via New York.

== Early life and education ==
He was born in Luzern to Rudolf and Creszentia Steinberger. He had one sister, Hannah 'Hanny' and one brother, Rudolf 'Ruedi'. Already during his schooling years he was known as the class comedian. In 1951, he started a commercial apprenticeship, with Swiss Post. After working as a counter clerk for nine years, he completed the Lucerne School of Design (today known as Fachklasse Grafik Luzern) and became a certified graphic designer. Back then he started acting part-time in a theater society known as Cabaradiesli in Lucerne.

== Career ==
He is well known as Emil in Switzerland and Germany for his acts on television in the 1970s and 1980s.

== Partial filmography ==
=== Cinema ===
- The Sudden Loneliness of Konrad Steiner (1976)
- The Swissmakers (1978)
- Messidor (1979)
- The Formula (1980)
- Kassettenliebe (1981, Switzerland)
- Videoliebe (1982, Germany)
- Kaiser und eine Nacht (1985)
- Ein Sonderling gerät in ein geheimnisvolles Milieu (1985)
- Niklaus und Sammy (1991)
- Typisch Emil (documentary about his life) (2024)

=== Television ===
- Emil auf der Post (1975)
- Frisch, frech, fröhlich – frei? – Eine Olympische Kabarettsendung (1984)
- Flucht mit Luzifer (Mini series, 1987)

== Works ==
=== Records and CDs ===
- 1970: Geschichten, die das Leben schrieb
- 1971: Geschichten, die das Leben schrieb, Teil 2
- 1972: EMIL improvisierte…
- 1973: E wie Emil
- 1976: Emil träumt…
- 1981: Feuerabend
- 2005: Eine kabarettistische Lesung (späterer Programmtitel: Drei Engel)
- 2008: E wie Essen (schweizerdeutscher Titel: Suppe, Wurscht und Brot)

as story teller:

- 1999: Astrid Lindgren: Immer dä Michel, 3 CDs
- 2004: Astrid Lindgren: Karlsson vom Dach / Karlsson fliegt wieder, 2 CDs
- 2010: Hugo Loetscher: Der Waschküchenschlüssel oder Was – wenn Gott Schweizer wäre
- 2014: Schwyzerdütsch mit The Grooves

=== Books ===
- Feuerabend. Diogenes, Zürich 1985
- Wahre Lügengeschichten. Kein & Aber, Zürich 1999; Ullstein, München 2000
  - erweiterte Neuauflage: Edition E, Territet 2004, ISBN 978-3-905638-23-3
- Emil via New York. Edition E, Territet 2001; leicht überarb. A. 2009, ISBN 978-3-905638-39-4
- Lachtzig. Knapp, Olten 2013, ISBN 978-3-905848-78-6
- Hans Fischer: Pitschi. Ins translated to Swiss German by Emil Steinberger. NordSüd, Zürich 2016, ISBN 978-3-314-10388-9

== Awards ==
- 1970: Anerkennungspreis der Stadt Luzern für kulturelle Tätigkeiten
- 1976: Deutscher Kleinkunstpreis in der Kategorie Kabarett
- 1981: Prix Walo
- 1986: Karl-Valentin-Orden
- 1988: Hans Reinhart-Ring der Schweizer Gesellschaft für Theaterkultur
- 1993: Morenhovener Lupe
- 1996: Ehrennadel der Stadt Luzern
- 1996: Goldene Schallplatten in Deutschland für die Videoalben Emil Steinberger – Volume 1 und Emil Steinberger – Volume 2
- 2003: Rose d’Or (Ehrenrose)
- 2003: Oertli-Preis für seinen Sprachgrenzen überschreitenden Humor
- 2004: Göttinger Elch für sein Lebenswerk
- 2004: Deutscher Comedypreis (Ehrenpreis für sein Lebenswerk)
- 2005: Salzburger Stier (Ehrenstier für sein Lebenswerk)
- 2006: Bayerischer Kabarettpreis (Ehrenpreis)
- 2007: Schweizer Kabarett-Preis Ehrencornichon
- 2007: Goldener Akustikus Nürnberg
- 2008: Ehrenbürger der Stadt Luzern anlässlich seines 75. Geburtstages
- 2008: Das große Kleinkunstfestival Ehren-Preis
- 2009: Anerkennungspreis der Stadt Montreux
- 2009: Münchhausen-Preis, Bodenwerder
- 2009: Stern der Satire Mainz
- 2010: Arosa Humorfüller – Jurypreis des Arosa Humor-Festivals für sein Lebenswerk
- 2011: SwissAward – Lifetime Award 2010 für sein Lebenswerk
- 2012: Ehrenpreis für Zweisprachigkeit Biel-Bienne
- 2012: Hall of Fame der German Speakers Association
- 2013: Radio Pilatus Ehren-Rüüdige Lozärner
- 2013: Preis für Menschenwürde
- 2014: Friedestrompreis
- 2019: Anerkennungspreis des Kantons Luzern
- 2021: Deutscher Kleinkunstpreis (Ehrenpreis des Landes Rheinland-Pfalz)
- 2022: Swiss Comedy Award Lifetime Award

== Personal life ==
Steinberger married his first wife, Maya Rudin, in 1966 and divorced in 1989. He has one son from this marriage, Philipp (b. 1967), as well as one illegitimate son Martin (b. 1981), who was conceived while he was married to his first wife. Since 28 May 1999, he has been married to German-born Nicole Steinberger (b. 1965), a native of Wermelskirchen, whom he met in New York City. They currently reside in Basel.
