= Zwei himmlische Dickschädel =

1974 film

- Directed by: Werner Jacobs
- Screenplay by: Kurt Nachmann
- Produced by: Horst Hächler
- Starring: Klaus Löwitsch; Reiner Schöne; Franziska Oehme
- Cinematography: Ernst W. Kalinke
- Music by: Ernst Brandner
- Distributed by: Constantin Film
- Release date: 1974
- Country: West Germany
- Language: German

Zwei himmlische Dickschädel is a 1974 German comedy film directed by Werner Jacobs and starring Klaus Löwitsch, Reiner Schöne and Franziska Oehme.

== Synopsis ==
A mayor who rules his hometown autocratically is challenged by the arrival of an idealistic young priest.

== Selected cast ==
- Klaus Löwitsch as Kamberger
- Reiner Schöne as Vilmos
- Franziska Oehme as Marei
- Max Strecker as Pfarrer Dominik
- Ludwig Schmid-Wildy as Wastl
- Gerhard Riedmann as Lechner
- Rosl Mayr as Toni-Tant
- Siegfried Wischnewski as Bischof
- Siegfried Rauch as Lenz
- Erica Beer as Fräulein Fabich
