= Buddy Elias =

Swiss actor and president of the Anne Frank Fonds (1925–2015)

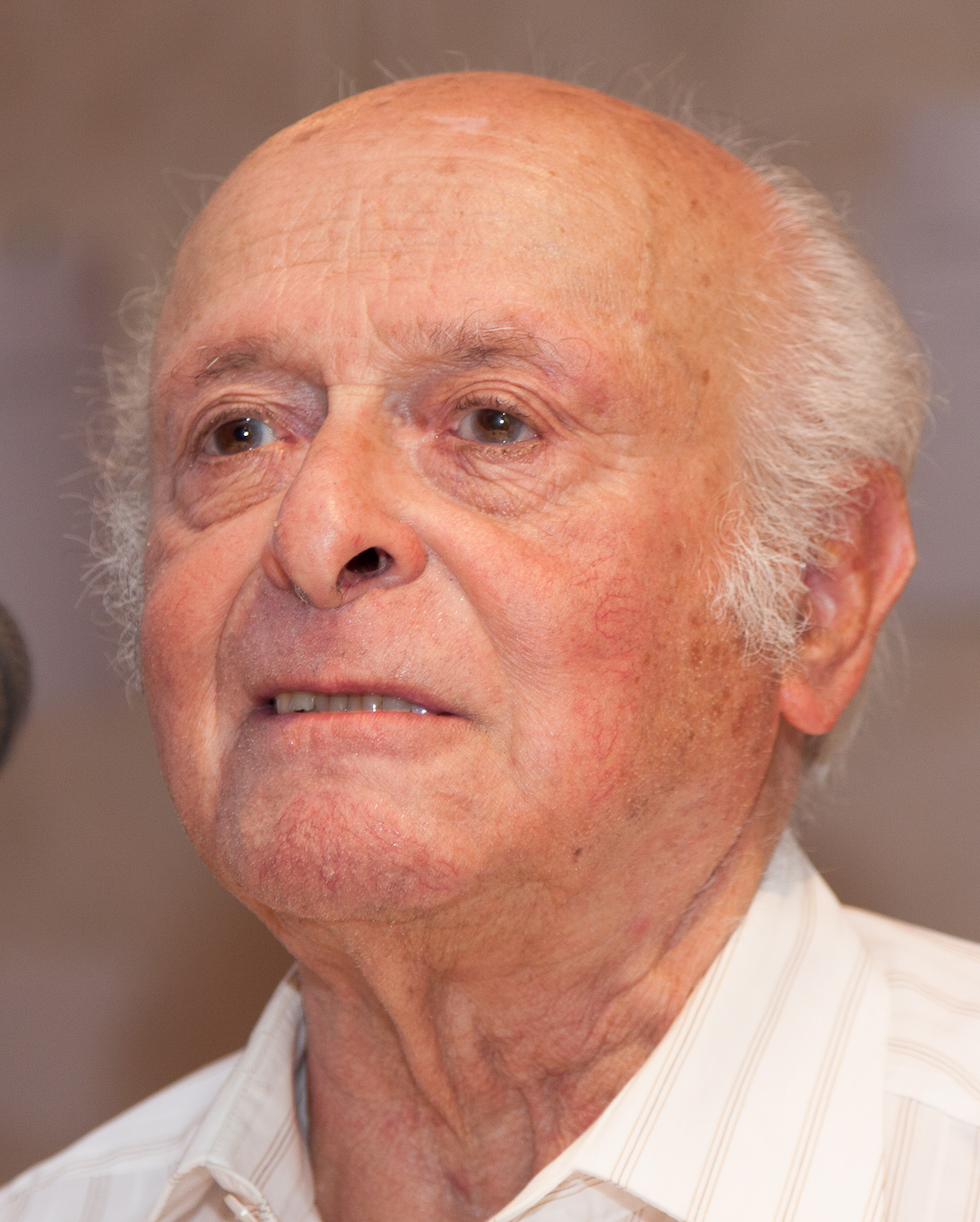
- Elias in 2012
- Born: Bernhardt Paul Elias; 2 June 1925; Frankfurt am Main, Weimar Republic
- Died: 16 March 2015 (aged 89); Basel, Switzerland
- Spouse: Gerti Wiedner (m. 1965)
- Children: 2
- Relatives: Otto Frank† (uncle); Anne Frank† (cousin); Margot Frank† (cousin)

Bernhard Paul "Buddy" Elias (2 June 1925 – 16 March 2015) was a German-born Swiss actor and president of the Anne Frank Fonds, the foundation dedicated to preserving the memory of his cousin Anne Frank.

== Biography ==
Bernhard Paul "Buddy" Elias was born in Frankfurt in Germany (in Weimar Republic period) on 2 June 1925. His mother, Helene "Leni" Frank, was Otto Frank's youngest sister, Edith Frank's sister-in-law, and Anne Frank and Margot Frank's paternal aunt. His father, Erich Elias, became head of the Basel-based Opekta company in 1929 and Bernhard moved there in 1931 with his mother and brother Stephan. Two years later his maternal grandmother Alice Frank joined them. Otto Frank visited his relatives in Basel on a regular basis, often with his daughters Anne and Margot. They also met in Sils Maria, where another relative lived. Buddy had a good relationship with Margot and in particular with Anne Frank, who was four years younger than him and like Buddy loved ice-skating.

In 1947, Buddy joined Holiday on Ice, where he was the star comedian, and toured the world with them for over fourteen years. After returning to Basel he started to work as an actor. He acted on stage in Switzerland, the United Kingdom, France, and Germany. In 1965, he married Gertrud "Gerti" Wiedner, an Austrian actress. The couple had two sons, Patrick and Oliver, who became actors. Since 1972, Buddy Elias appeared in almost 80 film and television productions.

Elias was the first cousin and last-surviving close relative of Holocaust diarist Anne Frank, who died in the Bergen-Belsen concentration camp in February or March 1945. Her Diary of a Young Girl became world famous and has been translated in more than 70 languages. The Anne Frank Fonds, founded in 1963 in Basel by Otto Frank, is responsible for the rights of Frank's Diary of a Young Girl, which until his death in 1980 had been headed by her father. As a Member of the Board of Trustees and as president of the Fonds, Buddy Elias dedicated himself to keeping alive the legacy of Anne Frank. He gave many lectures and interviews about the Holocaust and about Anne Frank. Elias was also committed to projects dedicated to stamping out racism and antisemitism. As a president of the Anne Frank Fonds he decided to bring together the estates of the Frank-Elias family in the Jewish Museum Frankfurt.

Elias lived with his wife, Gerti, in Basel, where he died on 16 March 2015.

== Filmography ==
- 1979: Drei Damen vom Grill (TV-series)
- 1979: David
- 1979: The Magician of Lublin
- 1981: Wie der Mond über Feuer und Blut
- 1981: Charlotte
- 1982: The Magic Mountain
- 1982: Kassettenliebe
- 1983: Das Traumschiff
- 1987: Die Schwarzwaldklinik
- 1987: Bang! You're Dead!
- 1989–1992: Mit Leib und Seele (ZDF TV-series)
- 1990: Die Frosch-Intrige
- 1991: Bronstein's Children
- 1993: Wolffs Revier
- 1995: My Mother's Courage
- 1998: Totalschaden
- 1999: St. Angela
- 1999: Tatort (episode Bienzle und die lange Wut)
- 2002: Edel & Starck (episode Das Soufflé der Götter)
- 2004: Bella Block (episode Hinter den Spiegeln)
- 2004: Was nützt die Liebe in Gedanken
- 2006: Alles Atze (episode Die Rückkehr des Lehrers)
- 2009: Hunkeler und der Fall Livius
- 2014: The Monuments Men

== Audioplays ==
- Die Abenteuer des Odysseus. Buch Jürgen Knop, Director Ulli Herzog, 1982.
- Hugo Rendler: Finkbeiners Geburtstag. Radio-Tatort, SWR 2010.
- Bibi Blocksberg: Ein verhexter Urlaub
- Benjamin Blümchen as Rudi Rundleder.

== Awards ==
- 2012: Ehrenplakette der Stadt Frankfurt am Main (Medal of Honour of the City Frankfurt am Main)
- 2007: Basler Stern (in German)

== Literature ==
- Andreas Kotte, ed. (2005). "Buddy Elias". Theaterlexikon der Schweiz / Dictionnaire du théâtre en Suisse / Dizionario Teatrale Svizzero / Lexicon da teater svizzer [Theater Dictionary of Switzerland]. Vol. 1. Zürich: Chronos. p. 528. ISBN 978-3-0340-0715-3. LCCN 2007423414. OCLC 62309181.
