= The Swissmakers =

Die Schweizermacher
- Directed by: Rolf Lyssy
- Written by: Rolf Lyssy; Christa Maerker
- Cinematography: Fritz E. Maeder
- Edited by: Georg Janett
- Music by: Jonas C. Haefeli
- Production companies: T&C Film AG
- Release date: 1978
- Running time: 104 minutes
- Language: Swiss German

The Swissmakers (German: Die Schweizermacher) is a 1978 Swiss comedy film directed by Rolf Lyssy and written by Lyssy and Christa Maerker. It satirises Swiss naturalisation procedures through the story of two officials who investigate foreigners seeking Swiss citizenship. It was later adapted for the stage and screened at festivals and in retrospectives.

== Synopsis ==
The film centres on the naturalisation officials Max Bodmer and Moritz Fischer, who closely examine foreigners seeking Swiss citizenship. The film is an ironic-satirical comedy about Swiss identity and becoming Swiss. It follows several foreigners applying for Swiss citizenship, including a German psychiatrist, a Yugoslav dancer, and an Italian pastry chef.

== Cast ==
The cast includes:

- Walo Lüönd as Max Bodmer
- Emil Steinberger as Moritz Fischer
- Beatrice Kessler as Milena Vakulic
- Wolfgang Stendar as Dr. Helmut Starke
- Hilde Ziegler as Gertrud Starke
- Claudio Caramaschi as Francesco Grimolli
- Silvia Jost as Sandra Grimolli
- Bettina Lindtberg as Martha Grosz

== Production ==
The film was produced by T&C Film AG. It was shot in colour on 35 mm film and has a running time of 104 minutes. Its cinematography was by Fritz E. Maeder, editing by Georg Janett, music by Jonas C. Haefeli, and location sound mix by Hans Künzi.

== Release ==
The film premiered in 1978. In 2019, the Swiss Federal Statistical Office listed Die Schweizermacher as the most successful Swiss film since 1976, with 941,552 cinema admissions in Switzerland. It has also been described as one of the most successful Swiss films of all time.

== Festival screenings and adaptations ==
The film was screened at festivals including Filmkunstfest Schwerin in 2005, the Solothurner Filmtage in 2008, Queer Lisboa in 2010, Festival Diritti Umani Lugano in 2015, and the Zurich Film Festival in 2016 and 2020, where it was shown as part of a tribute to Lyssy when he received the festival’s Career Achievement Award.

The film was adapted for the stage in Buochs in 2019. It had previously been adapted for the stage in Küssnacht in 2009 and was later produced as a musical in Zürich. In 2019, Emil Steinberger, who played Moritz Fischer in the film, said that he still considered the story current and questioned why naturalisation procedures were not uniformly regulated across Switzerland.

In 2016, the film was screened at Filmpodium in Zurich as part of the retrospective “Zum 80. Geburtstag von Rolf Lyssy”.
