= Kassettenliebe =

Kassettenliebe is a 1981 Swiss comedy film directed by Rolf Lyssy and starring Emil Steinberger, Franziska Oehme and Hilde Ziegler.

== Synopsis ==
A matrimonial agency is thrown into chaos when it adopts a new electronic system.

== Cast ==
- Emil Steinberger – Felix Stamm
- Franziska Oehme – Regula Koller
- Hilde Ziegler – Kundin
- Christina Amun – Miss Schildknecht
- Michael Gempart – Sicherheitsbeamter
- Buddy Elias – Doctor Wicki
- Wolfram Berger – Taxifahrer
