= Rolf Lyssy =

Swiss film director and screenwriter (born 1936)

- Lyssy in 2012
- Born: 25 February 1936 (age 90); Zurich, Switzerland
- Occupations: Film director, screenwriter
- Years active: 1956 - present
- Known for: Die Schweizermacher

Rolf Lyssy (born 25 February 1936) is a Swiss film director and screenwriter. He became widely known for the satire Die Schweizermacher (1978) and, in 2020, became the first Swiss recipient of the Zurich Film Festival's lifetime achievement award. In 2025, Die Schweizermacher still ranked first among the most popular Swiss films of all time.

== Life and career ==
Lyssy was born on 25 February 1936 in Zurich and spent his childhood in Herrliberg, where he was raised in a Jewish family of modest means. His father's parents had moved to Switzerland from Russia around 1900. His mother, who came from a Russian family of artists, arrived in Switzerland as a stateless person in the early 1930s. He attended school in Zurich before training as a photographer.

At a time when Switzerland offered no formal training for aspiring filmmakers, Lyssy entered the industry through technical roles. He began working in film in 1956, taking roles in cinematography, editing and screenwriting on both documentaries and feature films over the following seven years. In 1964, he worked on Alain Tanner's Les Apprentis. In 1966, he was co-cinematographer and editor of Reni Mertens and Walter Marti's Ursula oder das unwerte Leben. He made his feature-film directing debut with Eugen heisst wohlgeboren in 1968.

In 1974, Lyssy made Konfrontation, a film about David Frankfurter. The film drew international attention to his work in 1975. In 1978, he made Die Schweizermacher (The Swissmakers), a satire of Swiss naturalisation practices that depicts officials investigating applicants' backgrounds and integration into Swiss society. The film marked his breakthrough and brought him widespread recognition. In 2025, it still ranked first among the most popular Swiss films of all time, with around 940,000 admissions. Lyssy later recalled that his emphasis on comedy had made him something of an outsider among Swiss filmmakers of his generation. He regarded audience response as central to comedy, describing himself as the first test audience for his own films. He also emphasised the importance of a film's identity, arguing that characters' backgrounds should be reflected in the actors' dialects.

Lyssy's work encompassed both feature and documentary films. He also worked in theatre, directing several plays by Urs Widmer. In 1987, he directed the premiere of Widmer's Alles klar at the Theater am Neumarkt in Zurich. He later directed the premiere of Jeanmaire. Ein Stück Schweiz in Bern-Liebefeld in 1992. In 2001, Lyssy published his autobiography, Swiss Paradise.

== Awards and honours ==
- 1971 – Jury Prize, Sportfilmtage Oberhausen.
- 1975 – Film Prize of the City of Zurich.
- 1979 – Filmgildepreis of the German art-house cinemas for Best Foreign Film.
- 1989 – Audience Award, Festival international du film de comédie, Vevey.
- 2012 – Honorary Quartz for his body of work.
- 2020 – Zurich Film Festival lifetime achievement award, as its first Swiss recipient.

== Selected filmography ==
A selection of Lyssy's films as director includes:

- Eugen heisst wohlgeboren (1968)
- Konfrontation (1974)
- Die Schweizermacher/The Swissmakers (1978)
- Kassettenliebe (1981)
- Teddy Bär (1983)
- Leo Sonnyboy (1989)
- Ein Trommler in der Wüste (1992)
- Ursula – Leben in Anderswo (2011)
- Die letzte Pointe (2017)
- Eden für jeden (2020)
