= Hilde Ziegler =

German film and television actress

Hilde Ziegler (1939–1999) was a German film and television actress.

== Filmography ==
Year	Title	Role	Notes
1974	Assassination in Davos	Doris Steiger	
1978	The Swissmakers	Gertrud Starke	
1979	Messidor		
1980	Der Sprung von der Brücke		
1981	L'amour des femmes	Inge	
1981	Kassettenliebe	Sybille Mettler	
1989	Leo Sonnyboy	Lisbeth Hauser	
1990	Mirakel	Post- und Gemeindefräulein	
1992	Off Season	Mother	
1994	Vater, lieber Vater	Frau Hauser	
1994	Constable Zumbühl	Frau Imboden	
1997	Irrlichter	Sefi Tresch	
1999	Beresina, or the Last Days of Switzerland	Frau Vetterli	(final film role)
