= L'amour des femmes =

1982 film

- Directed by: Michel Soutter
- Starring: Jean-Marc Bory
- Release date: 13 February 1982
- Running time: 90 minutes
- Country: France
- Language: French

L'amour des femmes is a 1982 French drama film directed by Michel Soutter. It was entered into the 32nd Berlin International Film Festival.

== Cast ==
- Jean-Marc Bory - Bruno
- Pierre Clémenti - Philippe
- Heinz Bennent - Manfred
- Aurore Clément - Zoé
- Jean-Pierre Malo - Paul
- Séverine Bujard - Sonia
- Anne Lonnberg - Hélène
- Hilde Ziegler - Inge
- Anne Bennent - La fausse italienne
