= Franziska Oehme =

German film and television actress (born 1944)

Franziska Oehme (born 1944) is a German film and television actress.

== Selected filmography ==
- The Cuckoo Years (1967)
- Der Griller (1968)
- Always Trouble with the Teachers (1968)
- Oh Jonathan – oh Jonathan! (1973)
- Zwei himmlische Dickschädel (1974)
- Kassettenliebe (1981)
