= PTT Archive =

Swiss post and telecom museum

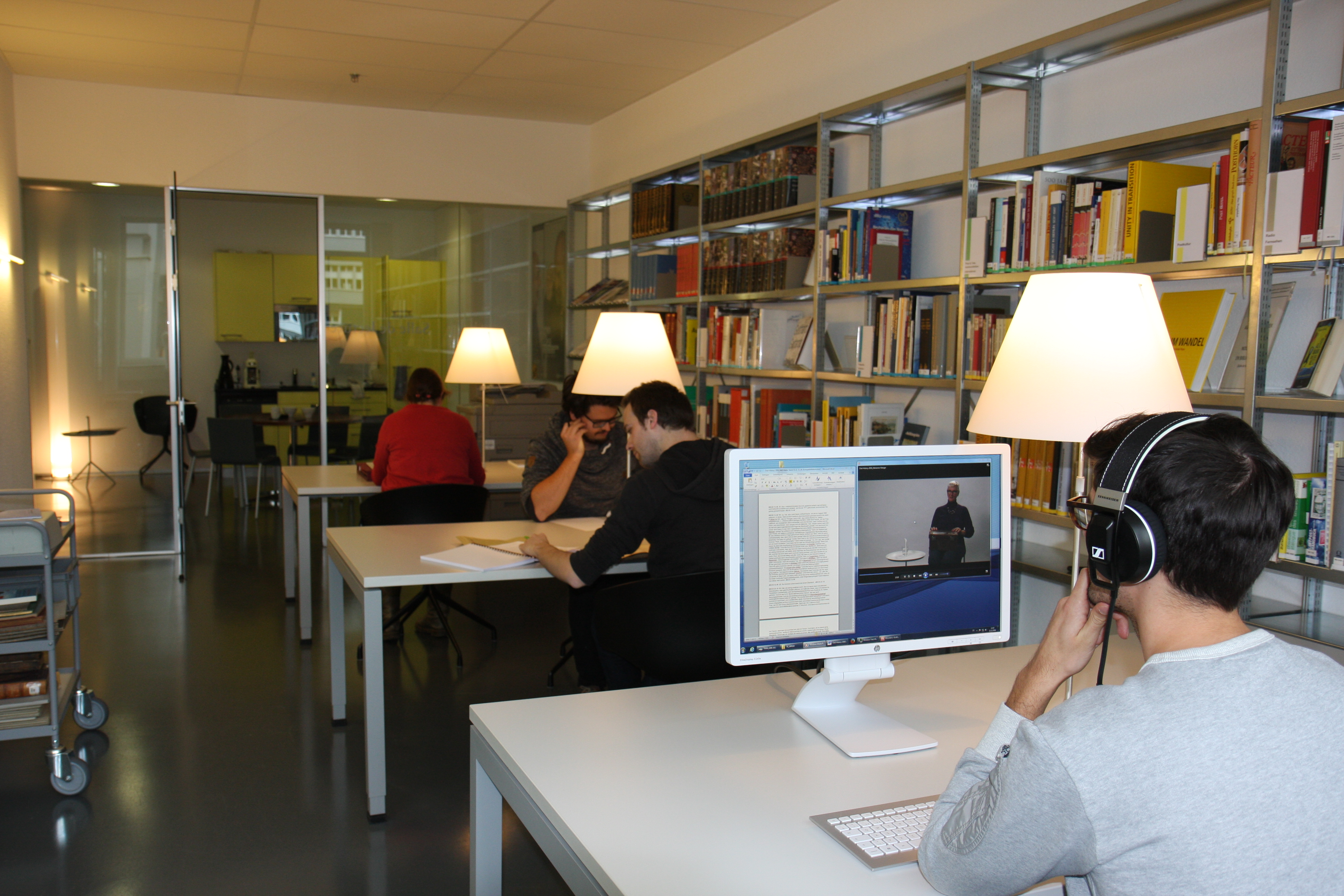
- Purpose: Company archive
- Location: Sägestrasse 77, 3098 Köniz, Switzerland
- Coordinates: 46.92408°N 7.41379°E
- Region served: Canton of Bern
- Official language: German; French; Italian
- Website: mfk.ch/en/ptt-archive

The PTT Archive (formerly Historical Archive and Library PTT) is the archive of the former Swiss Postal, Telegraph and Telephone Services (PTT). In 1997 PTT was split into two companies: Swiss Post) and Swisscom. The PTT Archive is operated on their behalf by the Swiss Foundation for the History of the Post and Telecommunications. Under Swiss archival law, Swiss Post and Swisscom, as successors of PTT, are bound to preserve the archive and make it accessible to the public. The PTT Archive is situated in Köniz near Bern and is classified as an object of national interest in the Swiss Inventory of Cultural Assets.

== History and Mandate ==
On April 30, 1893 the Directorate General of Posts in Bern issued an “Instruktion betreffend die Ordnung des Archivs, die Anlage und Führung der Centralbibliothek und die Besorgung der Registratur der Expeditionskanzlei der Oberpostdirektion“ [Instruction concerning the organization of the archive, the creation and the management of a central library and the provision of the filing cabinet of the Directorate General of Posts]. This is the earliest known historical source that is concerned with the creation of an archive and a library for the then still autonomous directorate General of Posts. This first archive and the library evolved into PTT's central information office, called „Bibliothek – Information – Dokumentation“ [Library – Information – Documentation] (BID), which employed up to 30 employees.

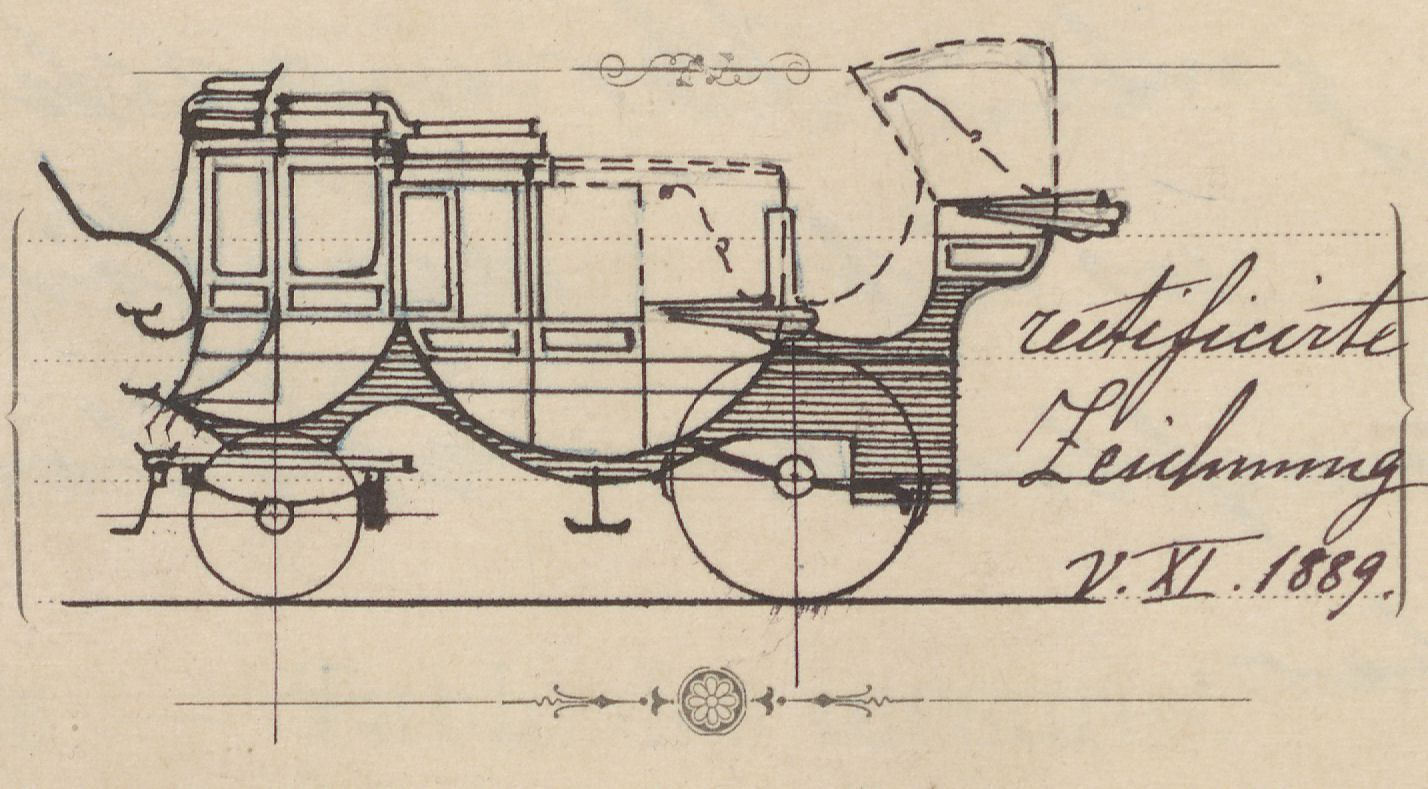
Report of the Swiss Postal Administration on the approval of a stagecoach, 1889

In its present form and with its current mandate, the PTT Archive came into existence only after liberalization. On December 31, 1997 Swiss Post and Swisscom transferred their corporate archives and the PTT library to the Swiss Foundation for the History of the Post and Telecommunications. The two founding companies agreed to store holdings for both companies at the same location. The “Historische Archive und Bibliothek PTT” [Historical Archive and Library PTT] was originally at Viktoriastrasse 21 in Bern. In 2013 the archive moved to its current premises at Sägestrasse 77 in Köniz.

The PTT Archive is subject to the Bundesgesetz über die Archivierung [Federal Law of Archiving] (BGA) and is the property of the Swiss Confederation. As such, holdings are kept confidential: 30 years for fact files and 50 years for personal files. Requests to inspect files that fall under the terms of protection can be directed to the PTT Archive.

In 1998, the Swiss Federal Archives and the Swiss Foundation for the History of the Post and Telecommunications agreed that the foundationto manage PTT's corporate archive, to develop the holdings appropriately and to make them available to the public. This means that the archived documents can neither be transferred nor removed without the explicit consent of the federal archives. Since 2018 the Historical Archive and Library PTT has been known as the PTT Archive.

== Holdings ==
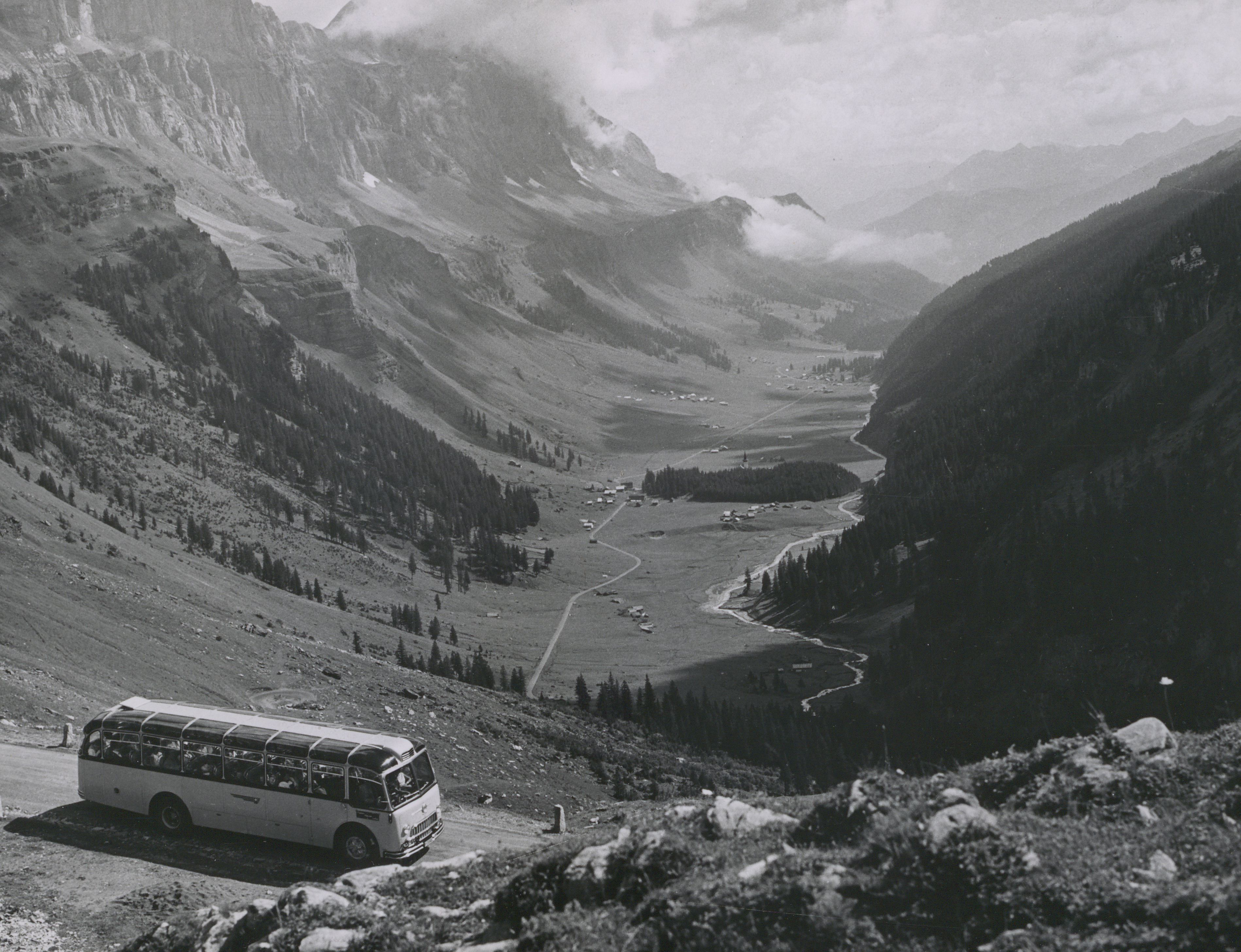
Postbustrip over the Klausen Pass, 1958

The archive's main holdings are PTT documents from 1848 to 1997, which are subject to the Federal Archive Law (Bundesgesetz über die Archivierung). The holdings are from all over Switzerland, from Geneva to St. Gallen so are in German, French and Italian. Documents from institutions which preceded the federal postal service can also be found in the archive.

The holdings include documents relating the organization and the management of the Directorate General of Posts, the District Postal Services as well as individual post offices. There are also documents about various postbus routes, transport and correspondence statistics, records about the development of the telephone and telegraph networks in Switzerland, the introduction of NATEL (Nationales Autotelefon), the internet and telefax, documents about PTT's research and development department, and employee records.

There are also many documents pertaining to specific technical or organizational subjects, which were put together by the BID department.

The archive also holds several hundred linear meters of grey literature, from workplace regulations and forms to telephone books. The PTT Archive holds the only complete collection of Swiss telephone books, dating back to the very first edition, issued in 1880. The PTT's former academic library with a focus on the history of postal services and telecommunication is also part of the holdings. It includes publications pertaining to the UPU (Universal Postal Union) and the ITU (International Telecommunication Union). Both international organizations were founded in Bern.

The PTT Archive's oral history project includes video material.

== Services ==
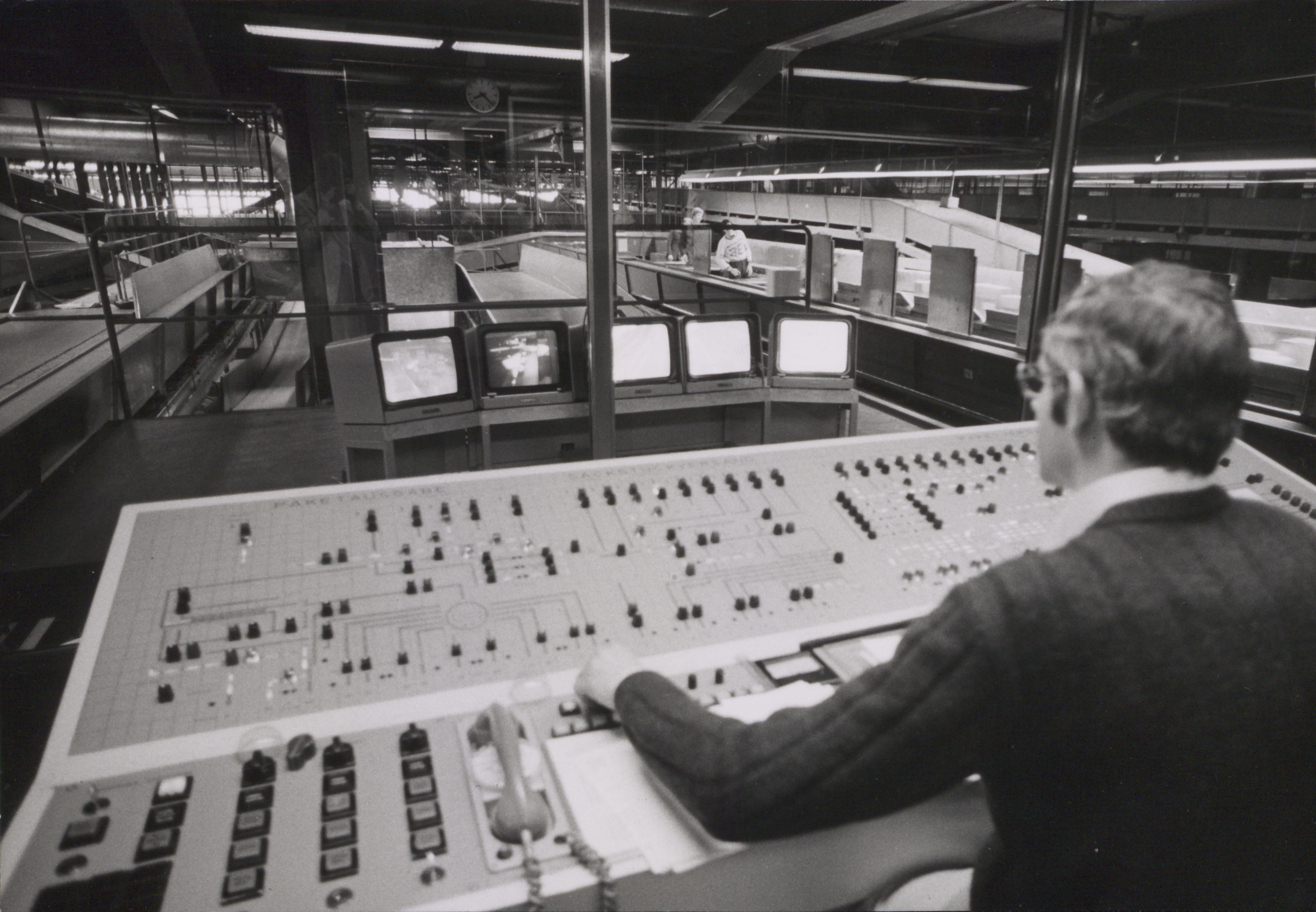
Control desk of the automated sorting system at the Schanzenpost in Bern, ca. 1965

The archive's primary responsibility is to secure public access to the holdings and to index them in an online database. The documents can be studied in the archive's study room. Every year visitors are given a tour through the depot, allowing visitors to get an impression of PTT's work.

The archive has an important intermediary function with the constant extension of its oral history project. With the interviews of former employees, the PTT Archive can establish a reference with today's Swiss Post Ltd. and Swisscom Ltd. Since 2014, the PTT Archive has conducted up to 14 interviews annually.

The PTT Archive is regularly involved in university courses and organizes Wikipedia workshops on various historical aspects of the PTT.

The archive has hosted intergenerational workshops for apprentices of Swiss Post Ltd. on multiple occasions. Apprentices engage with historical sources and discuss their current work routine with former PTT employees.
