= Swiss Post =

National postal service of Switzerland

Swiss Post Ltd
- Native name: (in German) Die Schweizerische Post AG; (in French) La Poste Suisse SA; (in Italian) La Posta Svizzera SA; (in Romansh) La Posta Svizra SA
- Type: Fully state-owned limited company (AG) regulated by public law
- Industry: Postal services, Courier
- Predecessor: Swiss PTT
- Founded: 1849; 177 years ago
- Headquarters: Bern, Switzerland
- Key people: Roberto Cirillo (CEO)
- Services: Letter post, parcel service, EMS
- Revenue: CHF 7,626 million (2024)
- Number of employees: c. 54,000
- Website: www.post.ch/en

Logo of Swiss Post between 1998 and 2023

Swiss Post Ltd (German: Die Schweizerische Post [diː ˈʃvaɪtsəʁɪʃə pɔst]; French: La Poste Suisse [la pɔstə sɥis]; Italian: La Posta Svizzera [la ˈpɔsta ˈzvittsera]; Romansh: La Posta Svizra [lə ˈpɔstə ˈʒvitsrə]) is the national postal service of Switzerland. A public company owned by the Swiss Confederation, it is the country's second largest employer with about 54,000 employees. The group is based in Bern and has branches in 25 countries. Roberto Cirillo is its CEO since April 2019. In 2021, Swiss Post was ranked as the world's best by the Universal Postal Union for the fifth time in a row.

== History ==
=== Early postal services ===
Before the establishment of a united postal service in Switzerland in 1848, postal services were often carried out by a variety of independent messengers and postal services such as the Thurn und Taxis in Schaffhausen and the Fischerpost in Bern.

=== In the Helvetic Republic (1798–1803) ===
After the French military complained to the government of the recently established Helvetic Republic about the different uniforms of the postal services, the decision to form a united postal service was approved by the Swiss Senate in September 1798. In 1799, Switzerland was divided into five postal zones centered in Basel, Zürich, St. Gallen, Schaffhausen and Bern but the Swiss Government was not able to nationalize the already functioning and well-established independent postal services. By 1803 the administration of the Swiss postal services was returned to the cantons.

=== Under cantonal administration (1803–1848) ===
Between 1803 and 1848 the postal services were administrated by the cantons.

The canton of Zürich was a major provider of postal services at the time, as it also operated the postal services in the cantons Thurgau and Zug and its carriages were allowed to transit through the important Uri with its Gotthard Pass. From 1823 onwards, the postal services from Canton Zürich operated a carriage between Zürich via Rapperswil to Chur and from 1826 the carriage was in service on a daily basis. in 1829 a daily service between Basel and Zürich was established. In 1835 the service was expanded to Bern and three years later the line reached Fribourg, Lausanne and Geneva. In 1835 the first steamboat was operated on Lake Zürich and in 1847 the first railway of Switzerland went into service between Zürich and Baden. In 1843, the cantonal post of Zürich issued the first stamp in Switzerland so the postman was relieved of the duty of collecting the money from the clients.

In Canton Bern the Fischerpost was the official provider of postal services, and it also operated the line over the Gotthard Pass to Italy. They were the official post service in the cantons of Solothurn, Fribourg and Geneva. Their position was rather dominant, much more so after Emanuel Friedrich von Fischer of the Fischer family was elected the president of the Bernese Republic. The Fischer dynasty ended in 1832, as the new Bernese liberal Government expropriated them.

Lucerne was the only canton which wanted to keep the post under a national administration, and had to withstand the Fischer family who attempted to obtain the postal rights from the canton in 1809 and again in 1814. Lucerne expanded its own service to the south in the Ticino, and its messengers were given transit rights through the cantons of Schwyz and Uri. From Lucerne carriages departed to St. Gallen, Olten and Basel. In 1839 the first steamboat on Lake Lucerne began to provide its services.

Uri leased transit rights to the postal services of Zürich. The condition was that the employees had to be from Uri. In 1828 Uri gave the right of transit to the postal services of Lucerne. From Altdorf in Uri, a daily carriage crossed over the Gotthard, reaching Milan in Italy.

The small Canton Glarus outsourced its postal services to two entrepreneurs until 1832, the year it began to operate the post through a cantonal administration.

The location of Basel at the northern border of Switzerland made the city a prominent centre for international mail exchange. In 1839 Basel ordered that post boxes accessible to the public be installed in the major squares of the city. After the train line between Basel and Strasbourg was inaugurated in 1844, it also transported mail between the cities.

== Swiss National Post ==
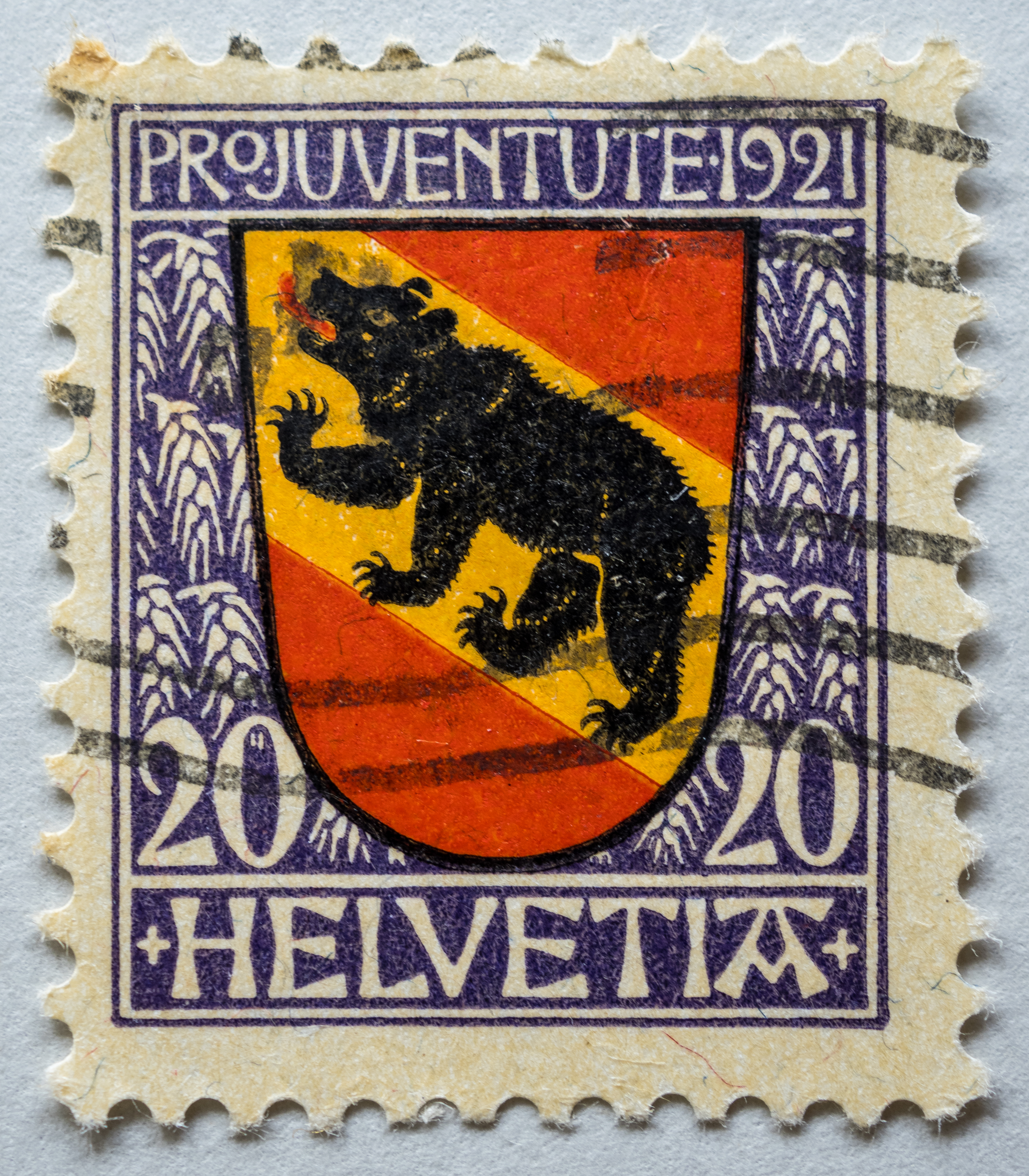
Stamp from 1921

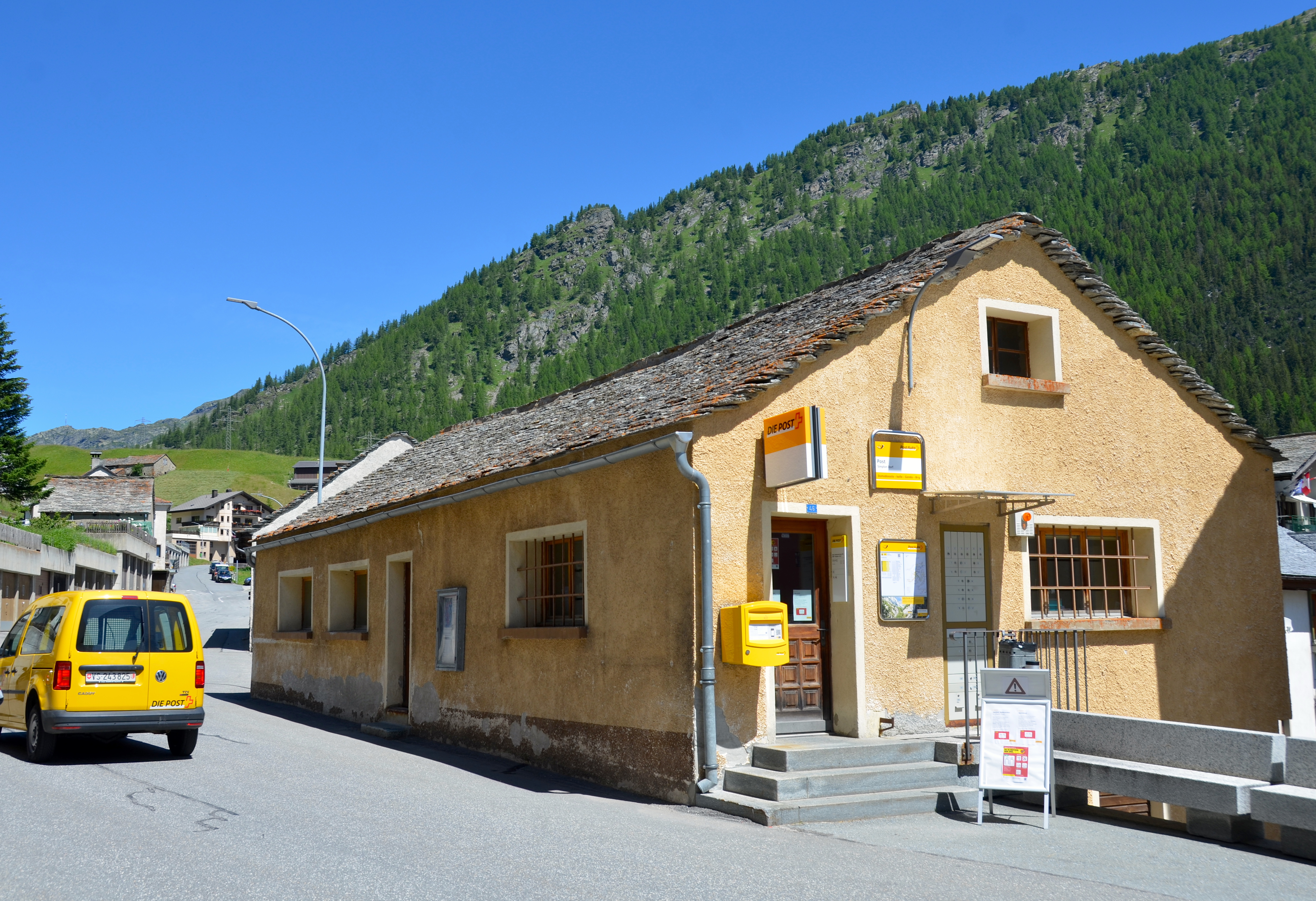
Post Office 3907 at Simplon, Valais

In 1848 the postal services were regulated by the new constitution which demanded a centralised administration. On 1 January 1849 the Swiss National Post took over the fourteen cantonal post services. The postal charges for letters and packages were the same in all of Switzerland from October 1849 onwards.

In 1850 the first stamps valid in all of Switzerland were issued. The same year the delivery time between Basel in the north of Switzerland and Milan in Italy was limited to fifty hours. From Basel the mail was transported to Lucerne, where it was shipped over Lake Lucerne to Flüelen in Uri, from where it was transported by carriage over the St. Gotthard to Bellinzona and Camerlata, from where it was loaded on a train to Milan. After four years of litigation before a court in Frankfurt, the Duke of Thurn und Taxis conceded the postal rights of Schaffhausen to Switzerland in return for 150,000 CHF in 1853.

In 1874, Switzerland organised the founding congress in Bern of the Universal Postal Union, of which it also became a member. After 1878, Swiss post offices on steamers and railways were tasked with accepting and delivering and also sorting out mail. Also donkeys, mules and even a dog were in service to deliver the mail.

At the beginning of the twentieth century, with technological progress, new significant means of communication arrived: the telephone and the telegraph. This led to the establishment in 1920 of the Postal Telegraph and Telephone (PTT), created from the merger of the federal telegraph administration and the general management.

In 1964, Switzerland introduced Postal Codes for mail sorting, becoming the third country (after the United States and Germany) to do so. Under Guido Nobel, Swiss Post introduced several innovations: in 1975, the first national mobile telephone network (Nationales Autotelefonnetz, from which the name Natel is derived) was established. In 1985, the first fiber optic cable was installed, connecting Bern to Neuchâtel. In 1978, the first Postomat (ATM) in the country was inaugurated, and in 1982, barcodes were introduced for mail processing, along with the creation of a new logo for Swiss Post by the typographer Adrian Frutiger. In 1985, the PostFinance system was integrated to include financial services such as current accounts and postal banking. Also under Nobel, in the first half of 1986, the postal service began the national implementation of the ISDN internet network, which was launched in 1988, and in 1987, the videotex/teletext system was introduced.

As part of the liberalization process, the Postal Act and the Federal Communications Act of 1997 (in effect from 1998) led to the split of the PTT into two companies. Postal services, including letters and parcels, payment traffic, and passenger transport, were assigned to Swiss Post (a public law entity of the Confederation), while telecommunications services were assigned to Swisscom (a private-sector company with majority participation by the Confederation). Under the new legislation that came into effect between 2012 and 2013, PostFinance was spun off into a private limited company subject to the supervision of FINMA, while remaining entirely owned by Swiss Post.

In December 2022, it was announced Swiss Post has acquired the St. Gallen-based sustainable packaging company, Kickbag GmbH.

=== Mail volume ===
In 1850 the post was responsible for dispatching 16 million letters in total or 7 letters per person. By 1910 it delivered fifteen and in 1950 eighty-two letters per person. In 1870, the urban centres were responsible for about 25% of the letters sent while accounting for only 9% of the population. In 1950 the post delivered 900 million letters, of which about 8% had a destination outside of Switzerland. In 1963 the mail volume rose to 2.5 billion letters.

In 2020, Swiss Post handled between 600,000 and 900,000 parcels each day. In 2023, the Swiss post delivered approximately 1,647 billion letters and 185 million parcels.

=== Real estate ===
The number of post offices increased from 1,502 in 1849 to over 4,000 in 1914. The volumes of mail delivered by the Swiss Postal Services increased significantly and between 1887 and 1915 so-called "Postal Palaces" were built in several larger cities. The first one was in Basel, then others followed in Zürich, Bern, Geneva and Olten. By 1985 the Swiss Post owned about 1300 buildings and rented more than 4100.

Due to changing societal habits and the rise of digital activities, between 2000 and 2024 there has been a rationalization of services, reducing the number of postal offices from approximately 3,500 to around 700.

=== Carriages and sleds ===
In 1849, the Swiss Post operated almost 500 carriages and 250 sleds pulled by horses. By 1913, the post used over 2,000 carriages and 1,000 sleds in its services.

=== Transportation of passengers ===
After its foundation, the post earned almost half its revenue from the transportation of passengers. In 1849, the Swiss Post operated almost 500 carriages and 250 sleds, which were also operating the popular express lines in the night. After the 1860s, the transportation of passengers was taken over increasingly by railway lines established along the same route as the most profitable carriages.

In 2023, Swiss Post transported 175 million people via PostBus, with a fleet of around 2,400 vehicles.

=== Railways ===
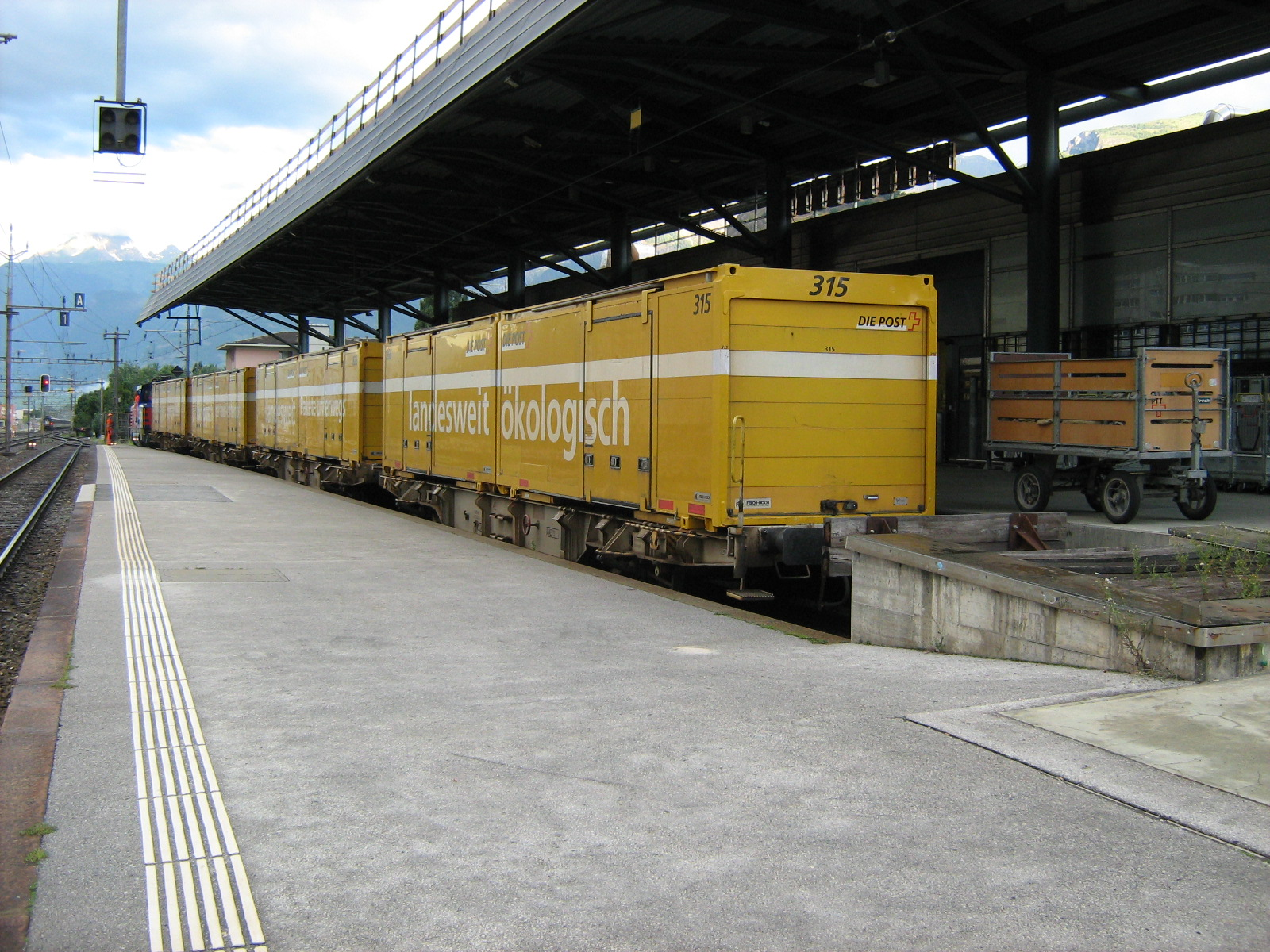
Postal wagons at the postal sorting facility in Sion, Switzerland. Mail between regional cities is transported by rail, to be delivered by postal bus, vans and cycles at a local level.

After 1844 the post delivered mail between Basel and Strasbourg in France and after 1847 also between Zürich and Baden. In 1857 post wagons owned by the Swiss Railways entered into service. In the post wagons the mail was sorted on train. By 1866 the Swiss Post decided to buy their own post wagons. In later years wagons with three and four axles were purchased. The wagons with four axles were equipped with compartments in which the mail was sorted and by 1965, over sixty postal train lines had come into service. In 1964, the Postal Codes were established and from then the mail was sorted more in specific centres. In 1986, there were 600 post wagons in the service of the Swiss Post.

=== Air mail ===
The first air mail was delivered mainly as a demonstration in the early 1910s. In January 1919, a regular military airmail service was established which by April 1919 was expanded also for civilian mail. But the service was not profitable enough and was discontinued in October the same year.

Despite the initial difficulties, air mail became a success and the Swiss Post soon expanded the service first to Germany, then to Europe, while still depending on the services of foreign airlines. Before the 1930s Swiss air mail reached Africa and Asia and by the 1930s seaplanes flying from the Atlantic ocean landed in South and North America. From 1931 onwards, the newly founded Swissair facilitated the creation of a dense European network for airmail deliveries.

During World War II, the services diminished until halted in 1944. The Swiss Post maintained a mail exchange with London and New York with seaplanes in the Atlantic on the Portuguese coast.

In 1946 the American Trans World Airlines opened a route to Geneva and the Swiss Post had its first direct connection to the American continent. Subsequently, at other Swiss airports like Zurich or Basel, international airmail was also received and dispatched. By 1985, the Swiss Post used the services of many international airlines in addition to those of Swissair.

=== Peculiarities ===
Until the 1850s about 25% of the post offices were in taverns, but this was soon forbidden by the Swiss Post as the vicinity of wine and post offices led to problems. In the 1950s a St. Bernhard dog pulled the mail carriage in Adelboden.

== See also ==
- PTT Archive
- Postal codes in Switzerland and Liechtenstein
- PostFinance
- PostBus Switzerland
- Asendia

== Gallery ==
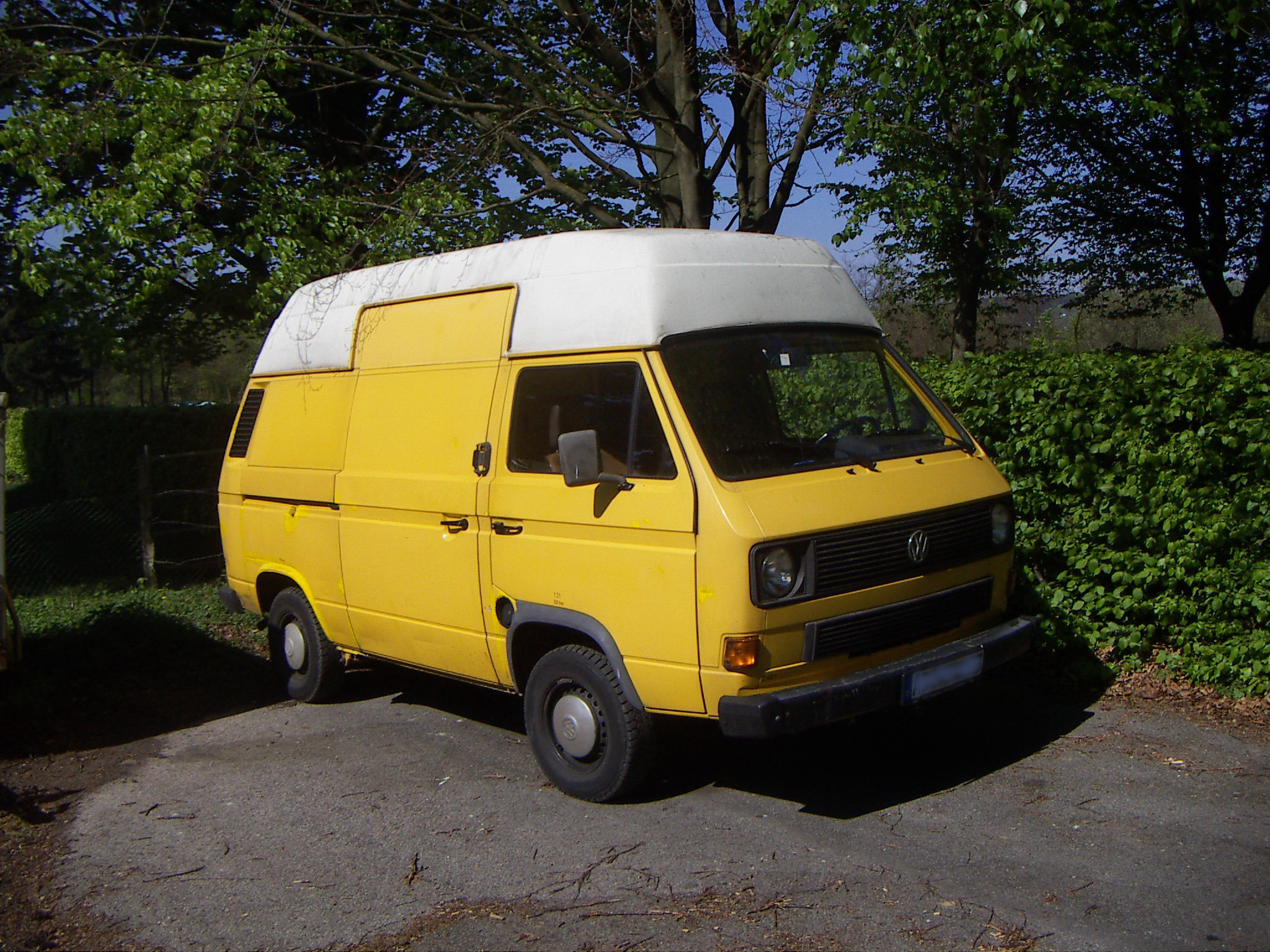
Volkswagen Transporter T3

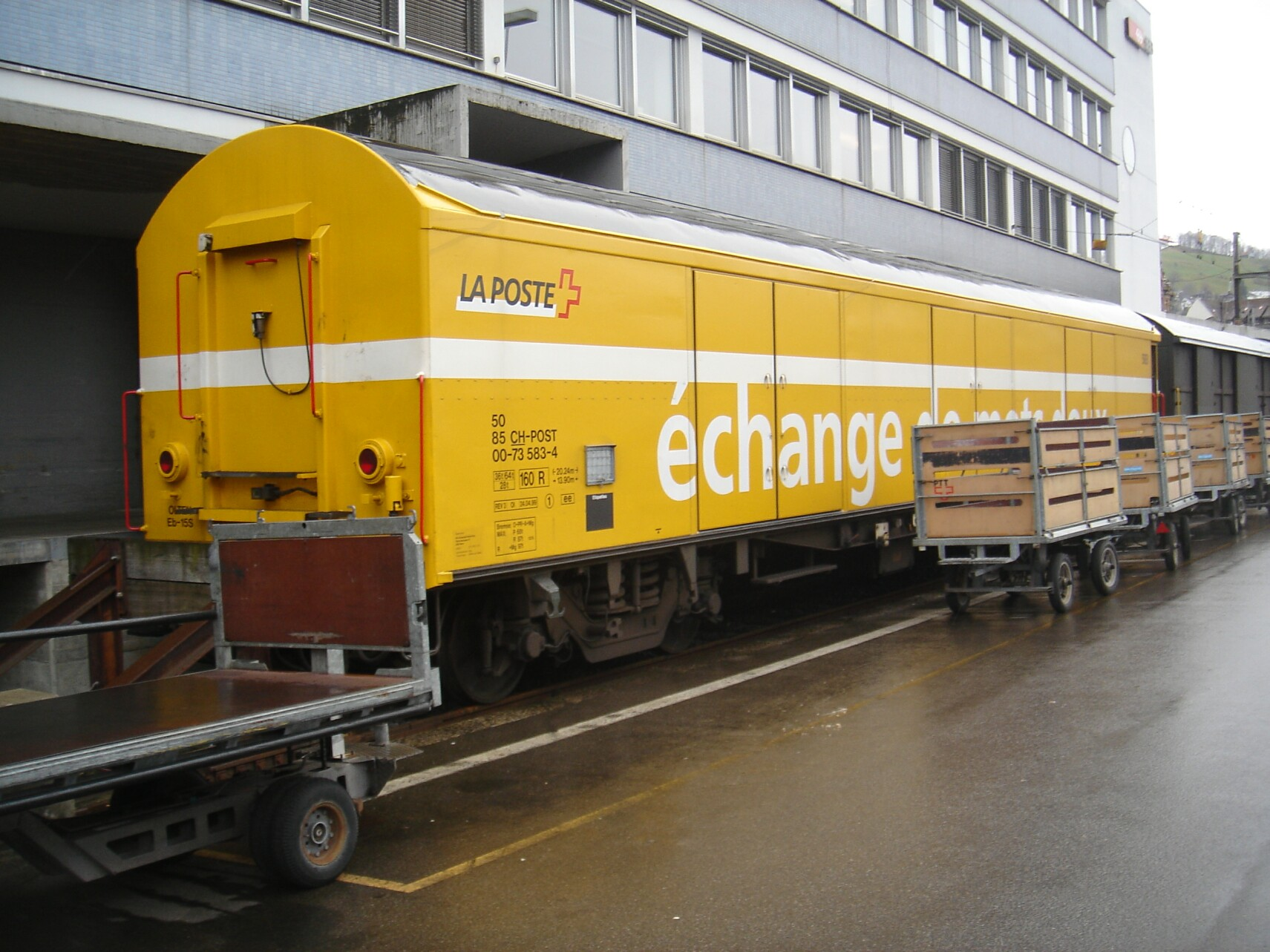

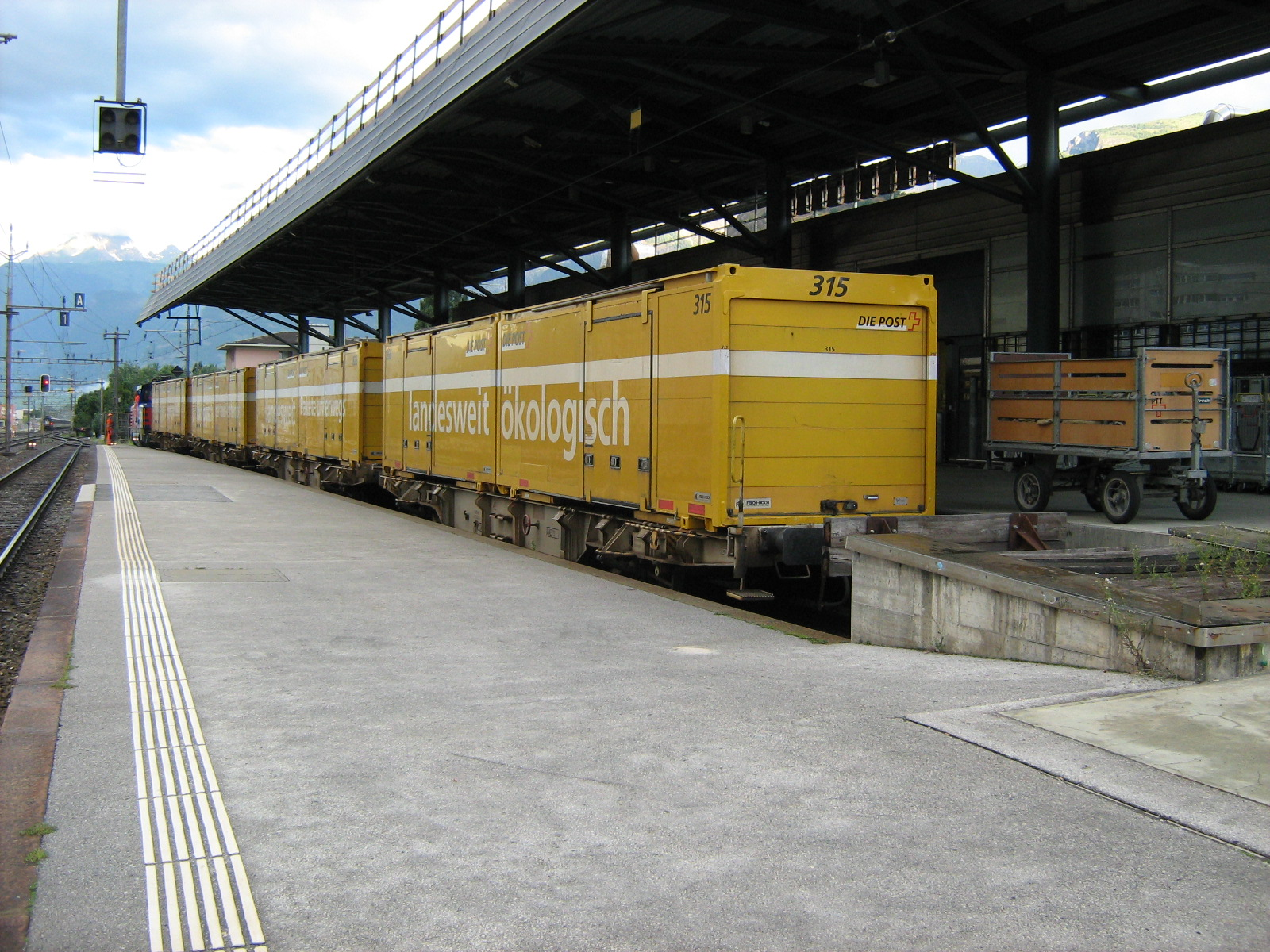
.

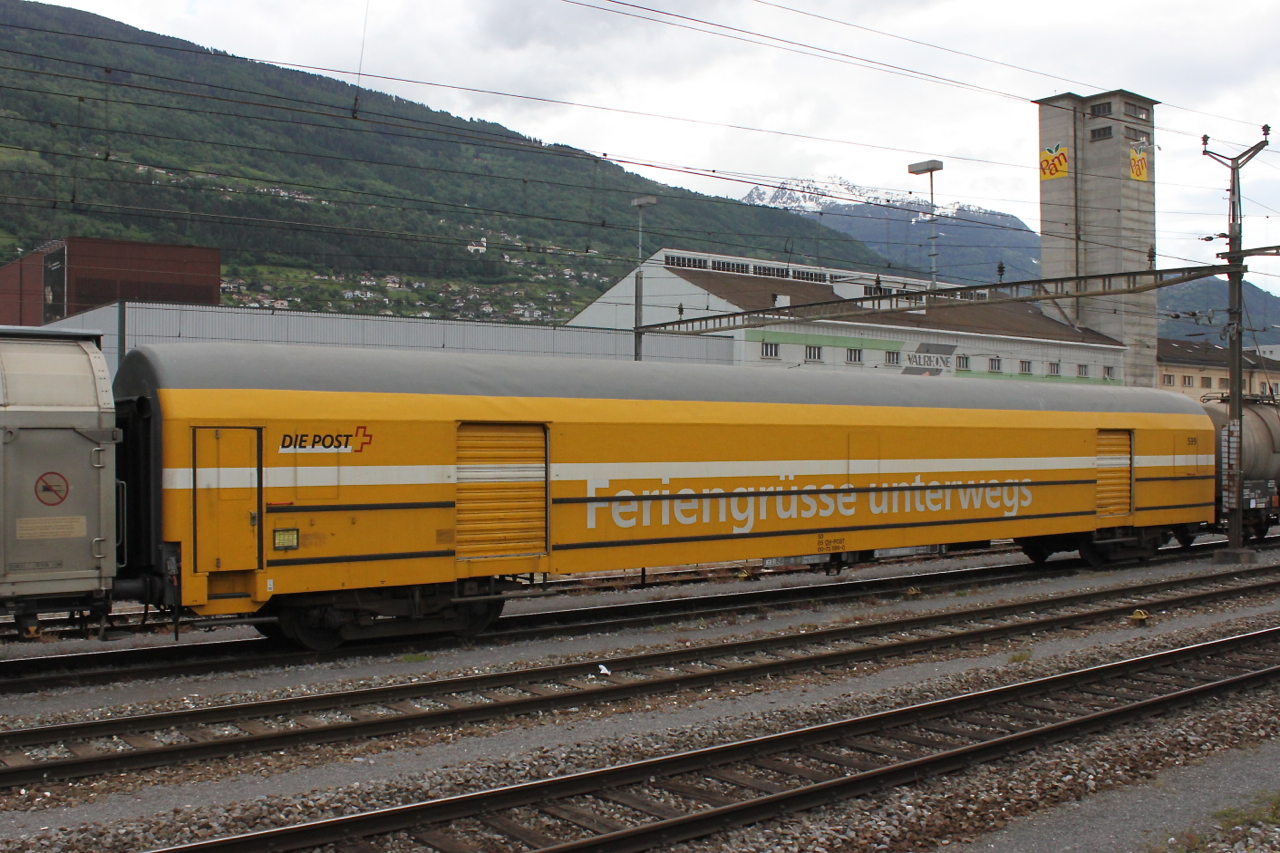

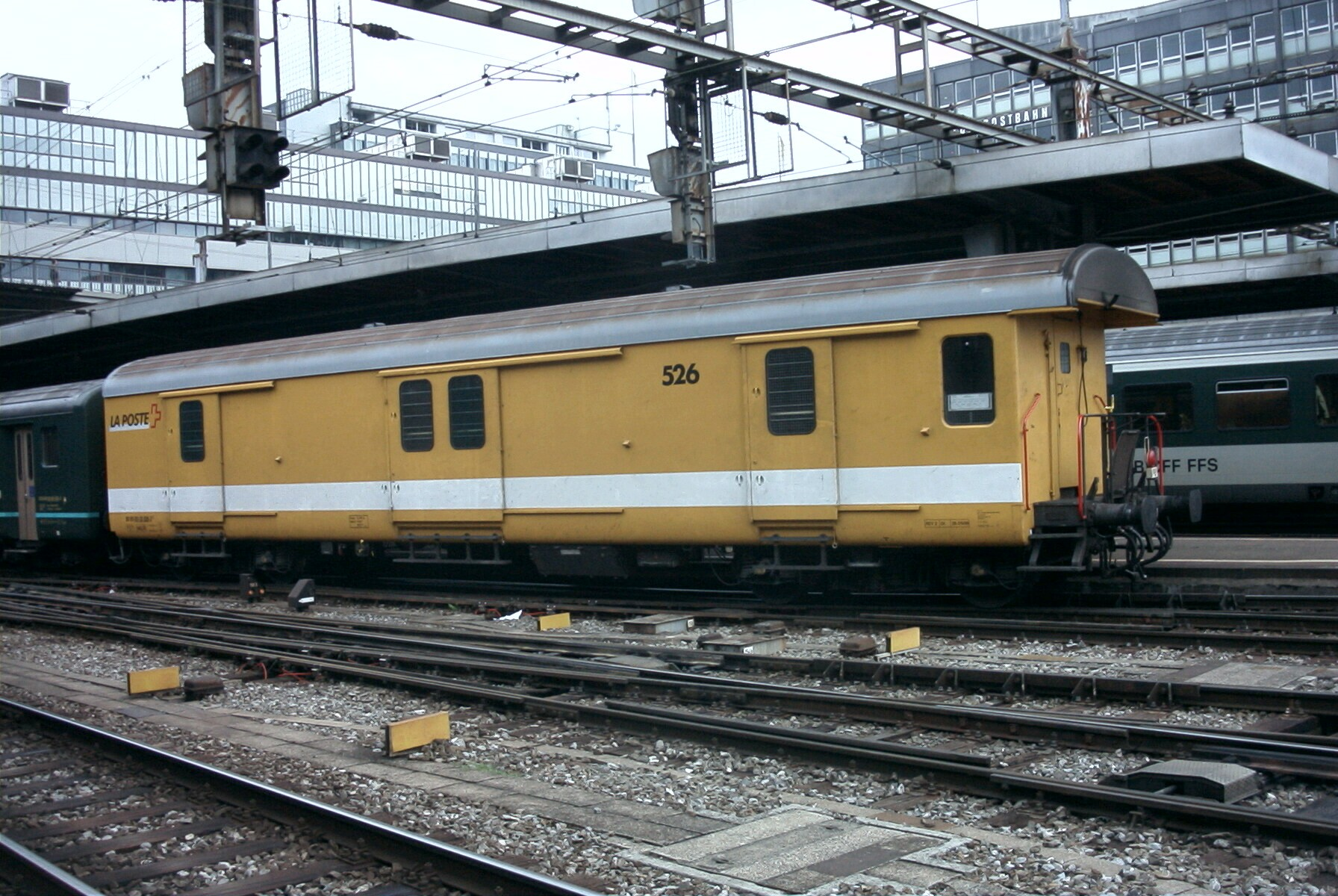

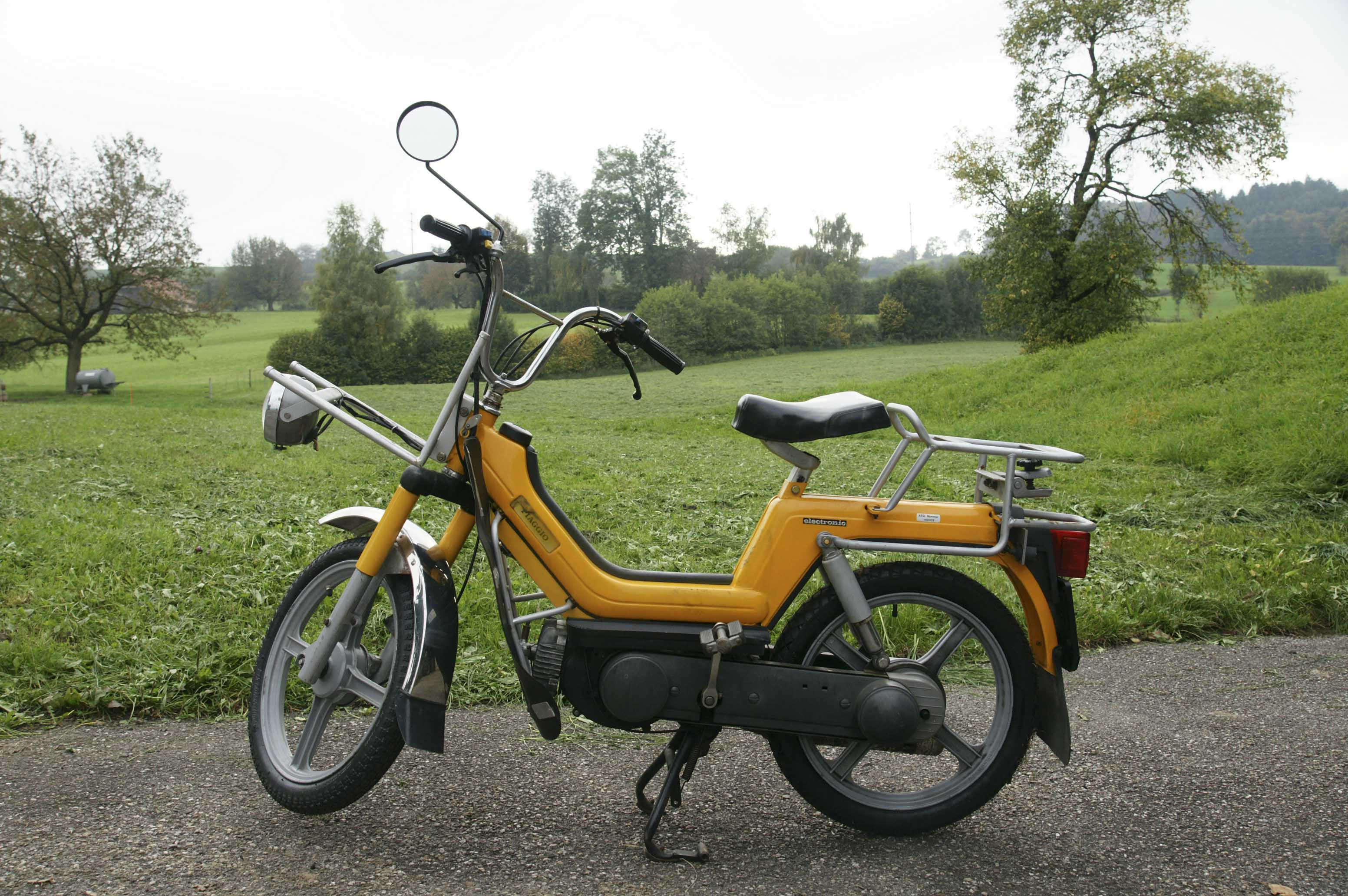
Piaggio

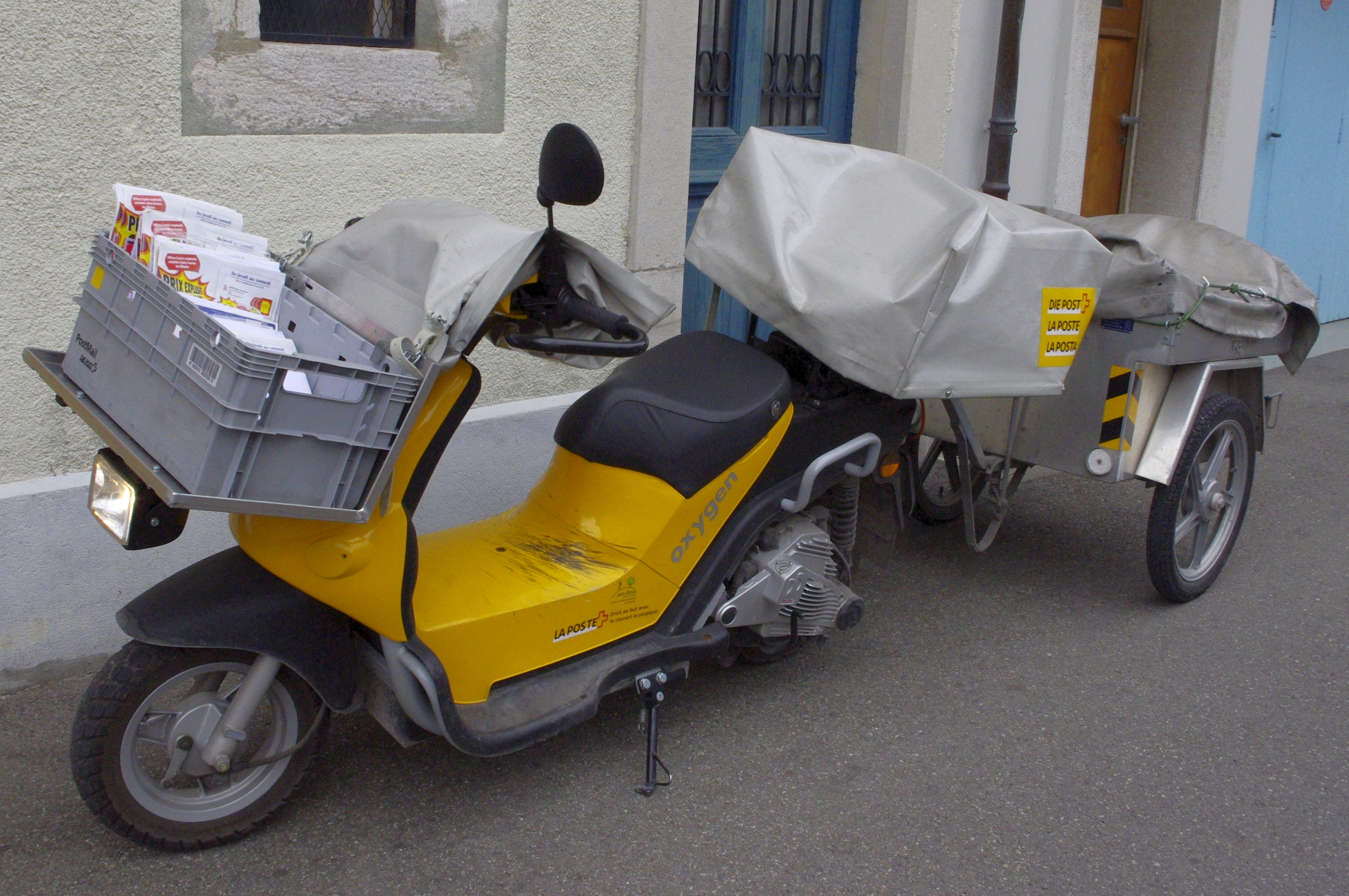
Scooter

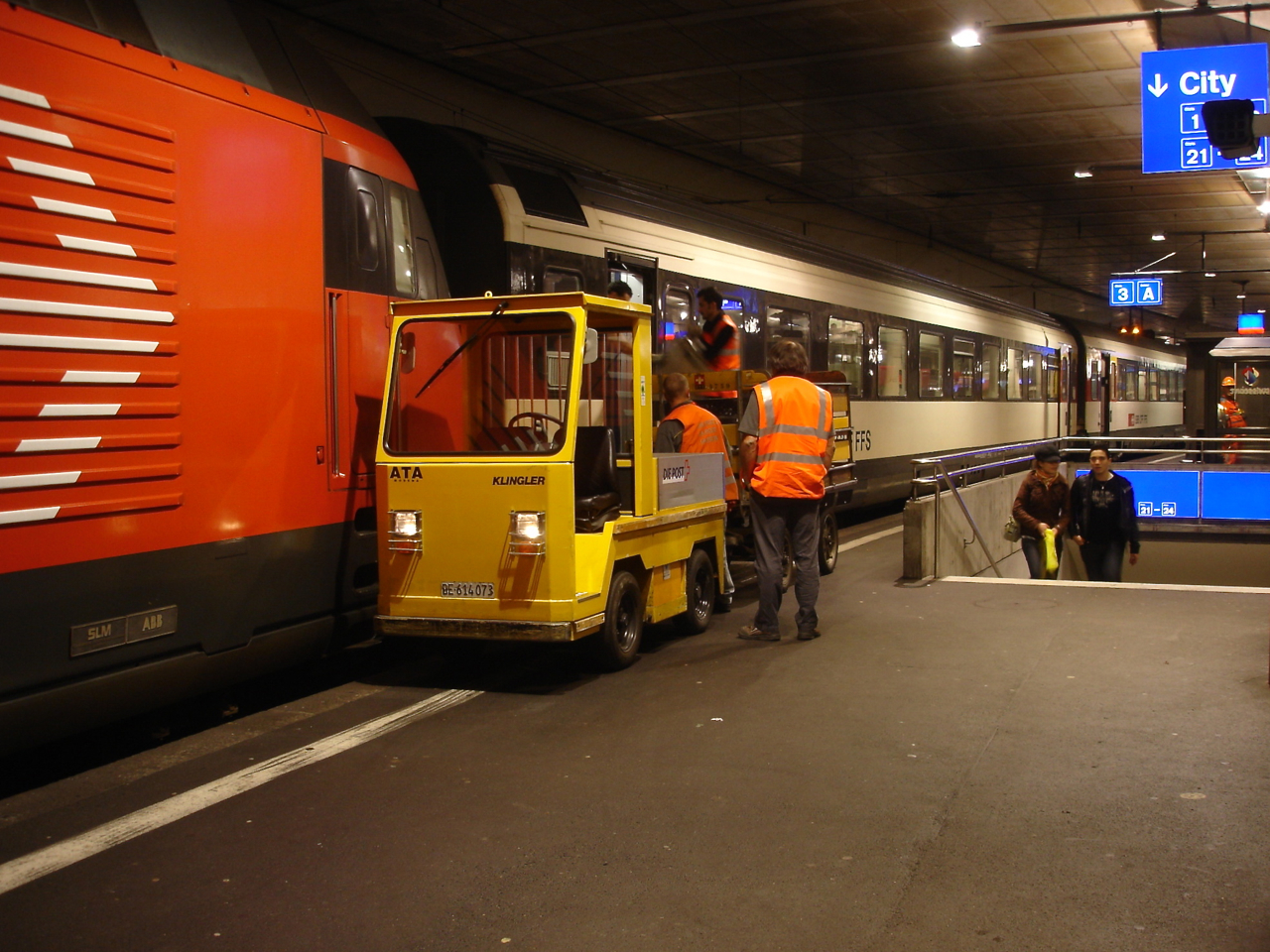
Klingler

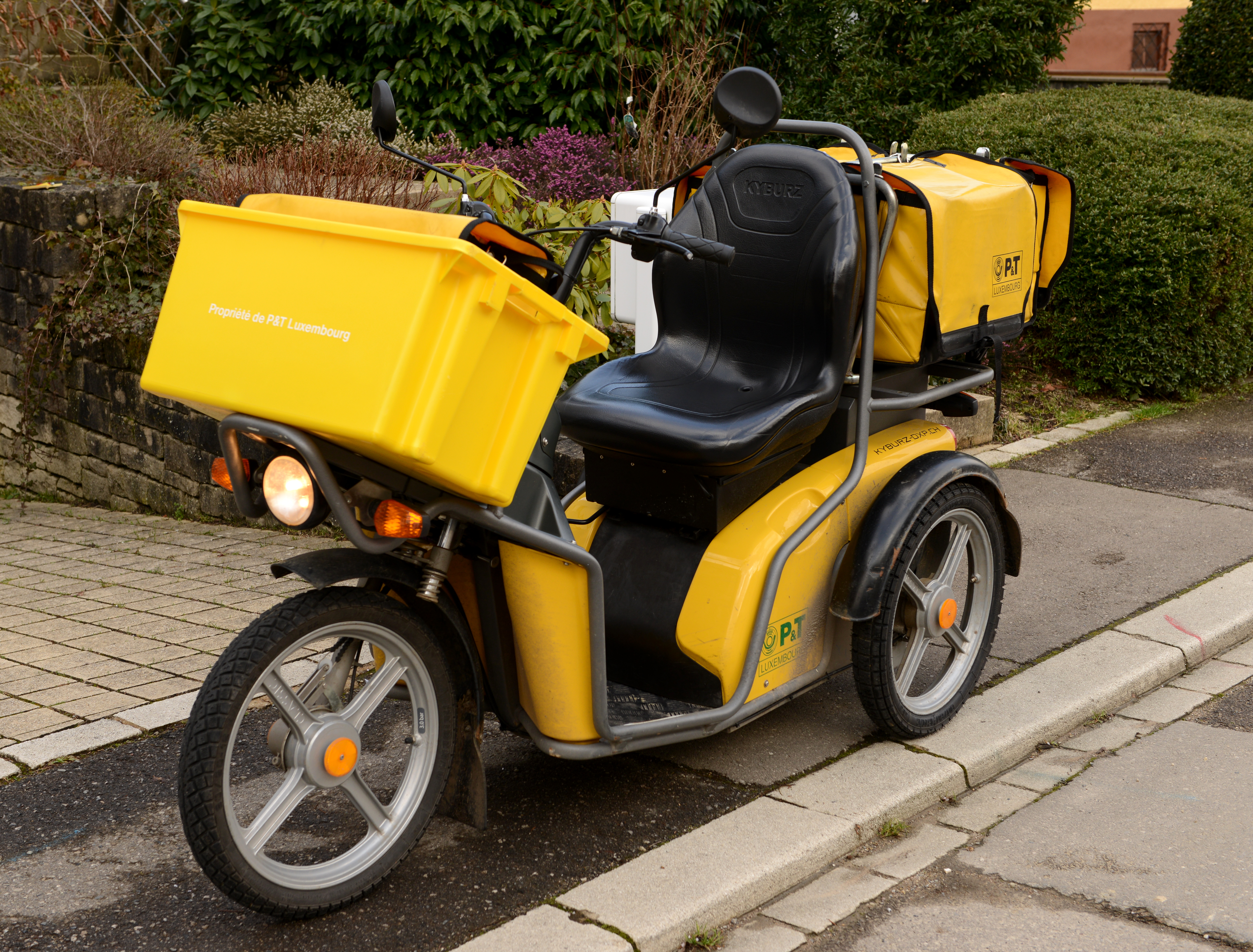
Kyburz DXP

== Note ==
- Wyss, Arthur (1987). Die Post in der Schweiz (in German). Hallwag. ISBN 3444103352.
