= Mishap =

Mishap may refer to:

- An accident
- The Mishap, a 1960 Italian film
- Mishap Creek, a stream in Alaska
