= Gilberte de Courgenay =

Swiss biographical film

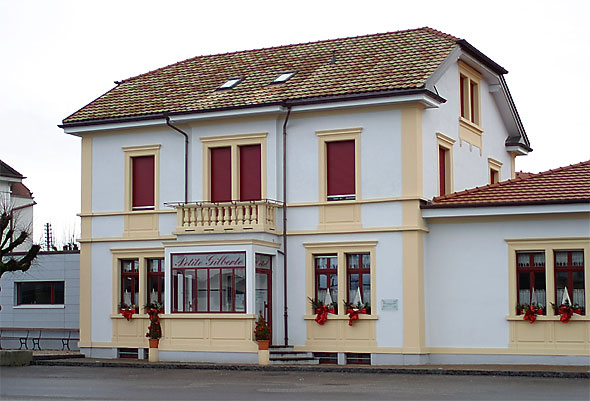
- Hôtel de Gare in Courgenay
- Directed by: Franz Schnyder
- Story by: Rudolf Bolo Maeglin
- Based on: Gilberte de Courgenay by Rudolf Bolo Maeglin
- Starring: Rudolf Bernhard; Anne-Marie Blanc; Zarli Carigiet; Hélène Dalmet; Heinrich Gretler; Max Knapp; Erwin Kohlund; Ditta Oesch; Schaggi Streuli; Jakob Sulzer; Heinz Woester
- Music by: Hanns In der Gand
- Release date: 1942
- Country: Switzerland
- Language: Swiss German / French

Gilberte de Courgenay is a 1942 Swiss biographical film about Gilberte Montavon directed by Franz Schnyder and starring Rudolf Bernhard, Anne-Marie Blanc and Zarli Carigiet.

== Story ==
The Film was based on a novel by Rudolf Bolo Maeglin and based on the story of the real Gilberte de Courgenay (actually Gilberte Montavon), who was a waitress in a hotel in Courgenay, a small town near the Swiss-French border. She served thousands of Swiss soldiers that were stationed in Courgenay during the First World War, when the neutral Switzerland had to protect its borders. Hanns In der Gand made the song La petite Gilberte de Gourgenay by Robert Lustenberger and Oskar Portmann from the Winter 1915/16 very famous across Switzerland. The popularity of this song quickly resulted in Gilberte becoming an idol for the soldats that had to keep watch far from home and their families.

The film is a love story around Gilberte de Courgenay (played by Anne-Marie Blanc). In the winter of 1915/16 the artillery battalion 38 is sent to Courgenay. Initially assuming that the war will soon be over, they're disappointed when they hear that they won't be able to celebrate Christmas at home. Gilberte organises a Christmas celebration for the soldiers and so becomes their idol. Secretly, she loves Peter Hasler (Erwin Kohlund), who is upset because his fiancee Tilly (Ditta Oesch) is not answering his letters.

When a colleague of Hasler has to travel to Berne with a sick horse, he finds out why: Tilly's rich father had seized all the letters from Peter because he thought that he was not appropriate for her. Tilly immediately travels to the Jura when she discovers this.

She finds Peter just during the most famous part of the film: When he sings La petite Gilberte in the Hôtel de la Gare in Courgenay adoring Gilberte. But Gilberte steps back and leaves Peter to Tilly.

== Creation ==
The film was made during the Second World War, in an attempt to raise national morale in the face of potential invasion (so called Geistige Landesverteidigung; Spiritual national defence).

== Cast ==
- Rudolf Bernhard: René Gengenbach
- Anne-Marie Blanc: Gilberte Montavon
- Zarli Carigiet: Luzi Caviezel
- Hélène Dalmet: Madame Montavon
- Heinrich Gretler: Friedrich Odermatt
- Max Knapp: Fritz Gubler
- Erwin Kohlund: Peter Hasler
- Ditta Oesch: Tilly Odermatt
- Schaggi Streuli: Gustav Hannart
- Jakob Sulzer: Otto Helbling
- Heinz Woester: Hauptmann/Captain
