= Franz Matter =

- Born: 2 March 1931; Schüpfen, Kanton Bern; Switzerland
- Died: 13 October 1999 (aged 68); Bern, Switzerland
- Occupations: Actor; Director
- Years active: 1958–1993 (film)

Franz Matter (1931–1999) was a Swiss actor and film director. A noted stage actor, Matter also appeared in a number of films including the 1958 literary adaptation The Cheese Factory in the Hamlet. He also worked as an assistant director, and directed the 1961 film Rosen auf Pump.

== Filmography ==
=== Actor ===
| Year | Title | Role | Notes |
|---|---|---|---|
| 1958 | The Cheese Factory in the Hamlet | Felix | |
| 1959 | HD-Soldat Läppli | Korporal Mathys | |
| 1960 | Wenn d'Fraue wähle | Camillus von Wollishofen | |
| 1961 | Die Gejagten | Titus Zangger | |
| 1962 | Jakobli and Meyeli | Vikar | |
| 1963 | Der Sittlichkeitsverbrecher | Fritz Stamm | (episode: Der Fall Claudia) |
| 1966 | The Doctor Says | Dr. med. Huber | |
| 1968 | Die sechs Kummerbuben | Gottfried Kummer | |
| 1970 | Dällebach Kari | Ein Kunde | |
| 1973 | Die Fabrikanten | Allemann | |
| 1981 | Völlerei oder Inselfest (Todsünde 4) | Felix Hess | |
| 1984 | Die Wandlung | Direktor Scholl | |
| 1986 | Lisi und der General | Kommissar | |
| 1991 | Tage des Zweifels | Professor Wagner | |
| 1993 | Justice | Hotel Manager Pedroli | (final film role) |

== Bibliography ==
- Goble, Alan. The Complete Index to Literary Sources in Film. Walter de Gruyter, 1999.
