= Emil Hegetschweiler =

Swiss actor (1887–1959)

Emil Hegetschweiler (1887–1959) was a Swiss actor.

== Filmography ==
Year	Title	Role	Notes
1933	Wie d'Warret würkt	Konfiseur Hänggeler	
1935	Jä-soo!	Jakob Stäubli	
1937	Kleine Scheidegg	Concierge	
1938	Fusilier Wipf	Coiffeur Wiederkehr	
1940	Fräulein Huser	Vater Hauser	
1940	Die mißbrauchten Liebesbriefe	Priest	
1941	Emil, mer mues halt rede mitenand	Emil Bürgi	
1942	Das Gespensterhaus	Fürsprech Tyffel	
1942	Der Schuß von der Kanzel	Krachhalder	
1943	Menschen, die vorüberziehen	Schlumpf	
1944	Landammann Stauffacher	Balz	
1947	Madness Rules	Pfleger Gilgen	
1948	After the Storm	Diener der Tretinis	
1952	Palace Hotel	Staub, Zimmerkellner	
1954	Uli the Farmhand	Joggeli, Glunggenbauer	
1955	Heidi and Peter	Lehrer / Teacher	
1955	Uli the Tenant	Joggeli, Glunggenbauer	
1956	Polizischt Wäckerli	Konrad Häberli, Gemeindekassierer	
1956	Oberstadtgass	Sattler Rüttimann	
1957	Taxichauffeur Bänz	Vater Schellenberg	
1957	Bäckerei Zürrer	Bäcker Zürrer	
1957	Der 10. Mai	Emil Tschumi	
1958	It Happened in Broad Daylight	Gemeindepräsident	
1958	Ludmila	Melker	
1958	The Cheese Factory in the Hamlet	Der Pfarrer	
1959	Hast noch der Söhne ja...?	Coiffeur Mani	
1959	Café Odeon	Walter, Oberkellner	

== Bibliography ==
- Bergfelder, Tim & Bock, Hans-Michael. The Concise Cinegraph: Encyclopedia of German. Berghahn Books, 2009.
- Halbrook, Stephen P. The Swiss and the Nazis: How the Alpine Republic Survived in the Shadow of the Third Reich. Casemate Publishers, 2006.
