= Bitzius =

Swiss patrician family of Bern

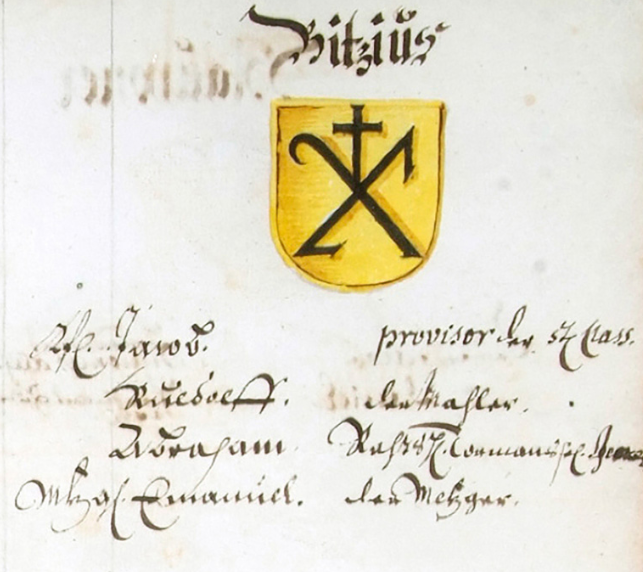
The Bitzius coat of arms in the Bernese register of arms, 1684

The Bitzius family was a Swiss patrician family of Bern. Its members exercised political power in the Bernese city-state in the 16th and 17th century. Its most prominent member was the writer Albert Bitzius, known as Jeremias Gotthelf.

== History ==
The family was established in Bern by Theodor Bitzius, probably a native of Lausanne, who became a citizen of Bern in 1522. The name is probably derived from Sulpitius. His son Theodor Bitzius (1534–1598) became a member of the state government (Kleiner Rat) in 1584; his many children established all subsequent branches of the family. The Bitziuses held senior legislative and governmental offices such as Landvogt or Schultheiss up until the first half of the 17th century. The last Bitzius to hold such offices was Abraham Bitzius (1614–1669).

In the second half of the 17th century, the Bitzius family lost its patrician privileges (Regimentsfähigkeit). Many of its members became engaged in crafts and trades such as goldsmithing, and served as clergy. Albert Bitzius (1797–1854), who published as Jeremias Gotthelf, belonged to the fourth generation of Bitzius pastors. Other notable family members included Gotthelf's wife Henriette Bitzius-Zeender (1805–1872), their son Albert Bitzius (1835–1882, a leading liberal politician and pastor), and their daughter Henriette Rüetschi-Bitzius (1834–1890, a writer). The last male descendant of Theodor Bitzius died in 1988.
