= The Mountains Between Us =

1956 film

- Directed by: Franz Schnyder
- Written by: Herbert Meier; Richard Schweizer
- Produced by: Oscar Düby; Lazar Wechsler
- Starring: Hannes Schmidhauser; Nelly Borgeaud; Peter Arens
- Cinematography: Emil Berna
- Edited by: Hans Heinrich Egger
- Music by: Robert Blum
- Production company: Praesens-Film
- Distributed by: Praesens-Film; Deutsche London Film (W.Germany)
- Release date: 21 December 1956
- Running time: 93 minutes
- Country: Switzerland
- Language: Swiss German

The Mountains Between Us (German: Zwischen uns die Berge) is a 1956 Swiss romantic drama film directed by Franz Schnyder and starring Hannes Schmidhauser, Nelly Borgeaud and Peter Arens. Made in Eastmancolor, it was part of the post-war boom in heimatfilm which reached its peak around this period. However the film was a commercial failure and received a poor critical reception.

It was shot at the Rosenhof Studios in Zürich and on location around Riederalp and Kippel in Valais and in the Italian capital Rome. The film's sets were designed by the art director Max Röthlisberger.

== Cast ==
- Hannes Schmidhauser as Beat Matter
- Nelly Borgeaud as Jacqueline Escher
- Peter Arens as Dominik Escher
- Heinrich Gretler as Posthalter
- Fred Tanner as Korporal Rémy
- Heinz Woester as Vater Escher
- Max Haufler as Federico
- Alfred Schlageter as Kommandant der Garde
- Johannes Steiner as Gardekaplan
- Erwin Kohlund as Arzt
- Willy Frey as Wirt
- Rita Liechti as Wirtin
- Peter Markus as Gardist

== Bibliography ==
- Kähler, Ursula. Franz Schnyder: Regisseur der Nation. Hier und Jetzt, 2020.
