= Kohlund =

Kohlund is a surname. Notable people with the surname include:

- Christian Kohlund (born 1950), Swiss actor and director
- Erwin Kohlund (1915–1992), German actor
