= Gilberte Montavon =

Swiss waitress and national symbol

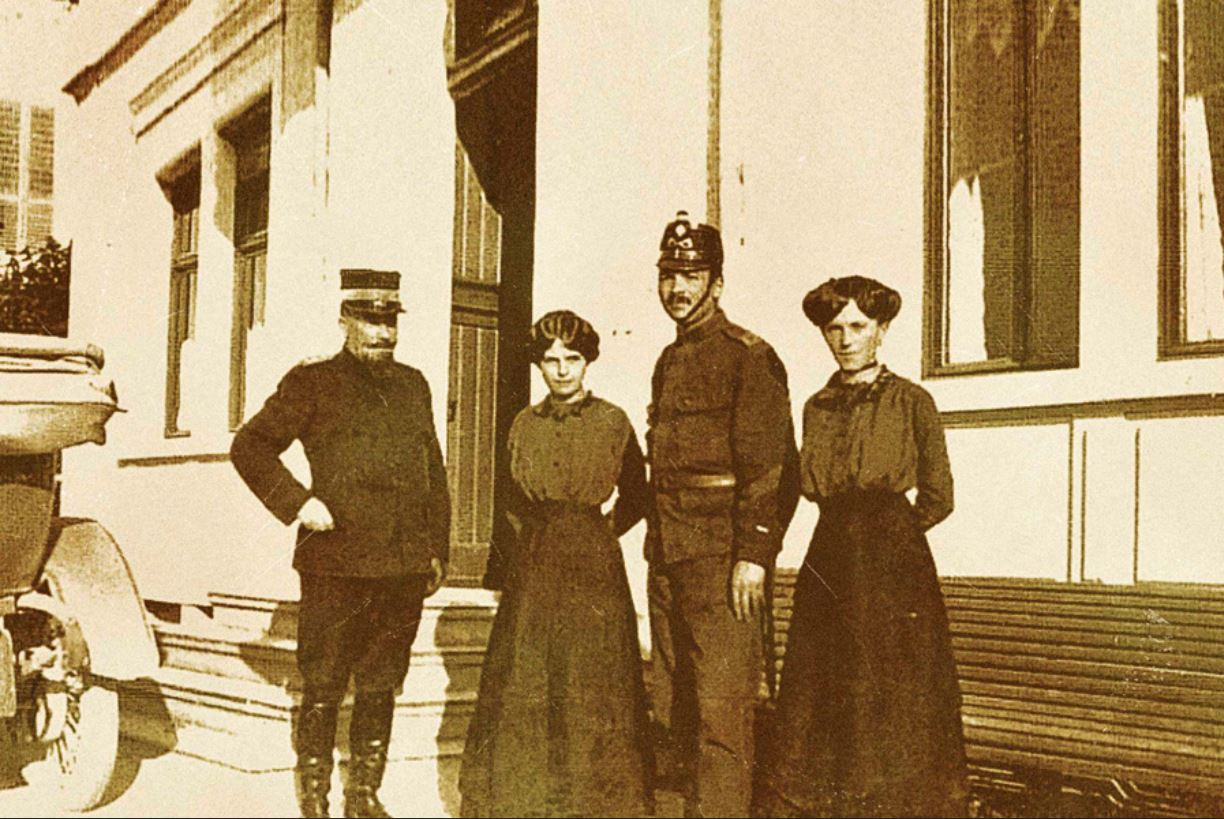
- Montavon (second from left) with Swiss officers in 1916
- Born: Gilberte Montavon; March 20, 1896; Courgenay, Switzerland
- Died: May 2, 1957 (aged 61); Zürich, Switzerland
- Resting place: Friedhof Nordheim
- Other names: Gilberte de Courgenay; Gilberte Schneider
- Occupation: waitress
- Spouse: Louis Schneider
- Children: 1
- Parent(s): Gustave Montavon; Lucine Laville

Gilberte Montavon de Courgenay (20 March 1896 – 2 May 1957) was a Swiss waitress who became a national symbol of spiritual national defense during World War I and World War II. She entertained Swiss Army troops at the Hôtel de Gare in Courgenay, which was owned by her family, and became popular with the soldiers. In 1917, the composer and folklorist Hanns In der Gand gave a concert at the hotel and performed his new song La petite Gilberte, written about Montavon. The song was adopted by the army to boost morale throughout the war. Montavon inspired Rudolph Bolo Mäglin's 1939 novel Gilberte de Courgenay and his play of the same name. Two films, August Kern's Marguerite et les soldates in 1940 and Franz Schnyder's Gilberte de Courgenay in 1941, were based on her life.

== Early life ==
Montavon was born on 20 March 1896 in Courgenay to Gustave Montavon, a watchmaker and hotelier, and Lucine Laville. She was born on the first floor of her family home on Fontaine-Allée. She had two older sisters, Fernande and Camille, and two younger brothers, Gustave and Paul.

Montavon was sent to a boarding school in German-speaking Alemania for her education. In 1914, Montavon returned from school, due to the war, and began working as a waitress at her parents' hotel, the Hôtel de Gare.

== National symbol ==
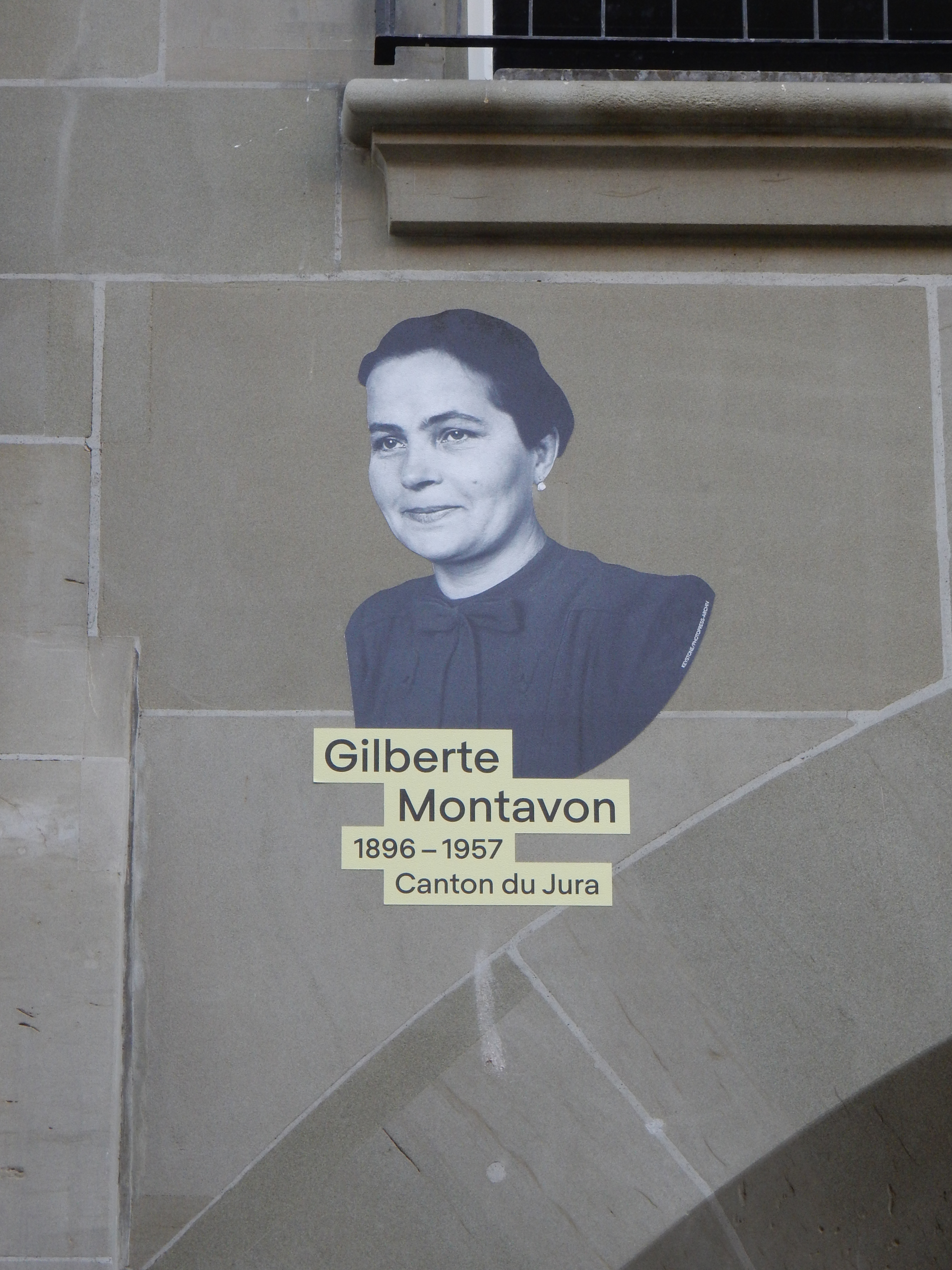
Painting of Montavon on the side of a building

During World War I, she entertained Swiss Army soldiers who were stationed in Ajoie, including many Swiss-German speakers. She was fluent in Swiss-French and Swiss German and would serve as a translator between the German-speaking troops and the French-speaking municipal officials. She would also repair uniforms and play the piano for soldiers visiting the hotel.

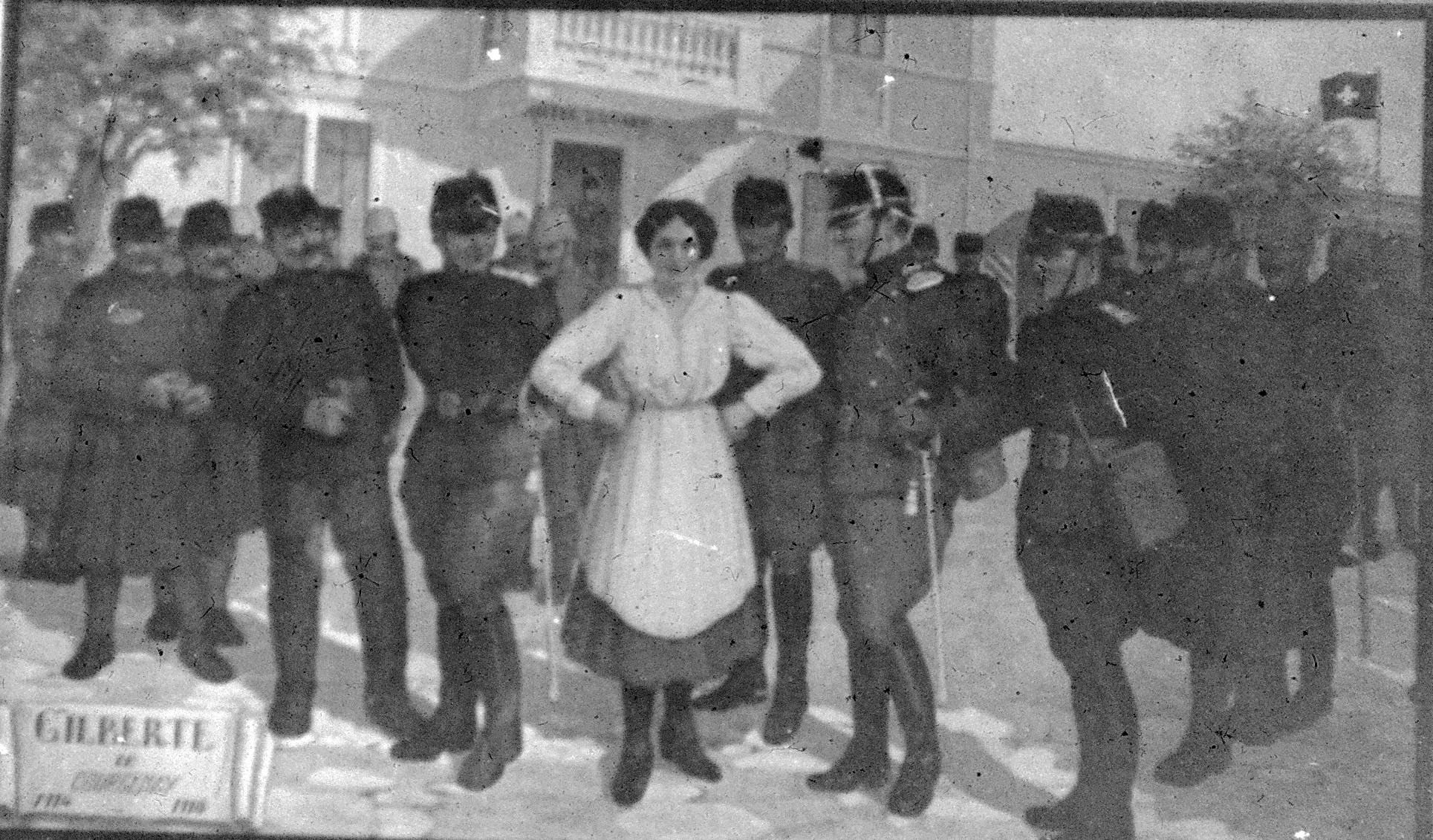
The 1949 painting Gilberte de Courgenay

In 1915, the composer and folklorist Hanns In der Gand visited Courgenay to collect popular songs to pass on to the troops. On 11 October 1917, In der Gand gave a concert at the Hôtel de Gare where he performed his song about Montavon titled Le petite Gilberte de Courgenay in German and French. The song was adopted by the Swiss Army to boost morale throughout the war.

In 1939, Rudolph Bolo Mäglin wrote a novel based on Montavon, titled Gilberte de Courgenay, and a stage play of the same name that was performed at the Schauspielhaus Zürich and in Basel. In 1940, August Kern produced the film Marguerite et les soldates, loosely based on Montavon. In 1941, the filmmaker Franz Schnyder made a film, Gilberte de Courgenay, based on Mäglin's novel. She was portrayed by Anne-Marie Blanc in the film.

== Personal life ==
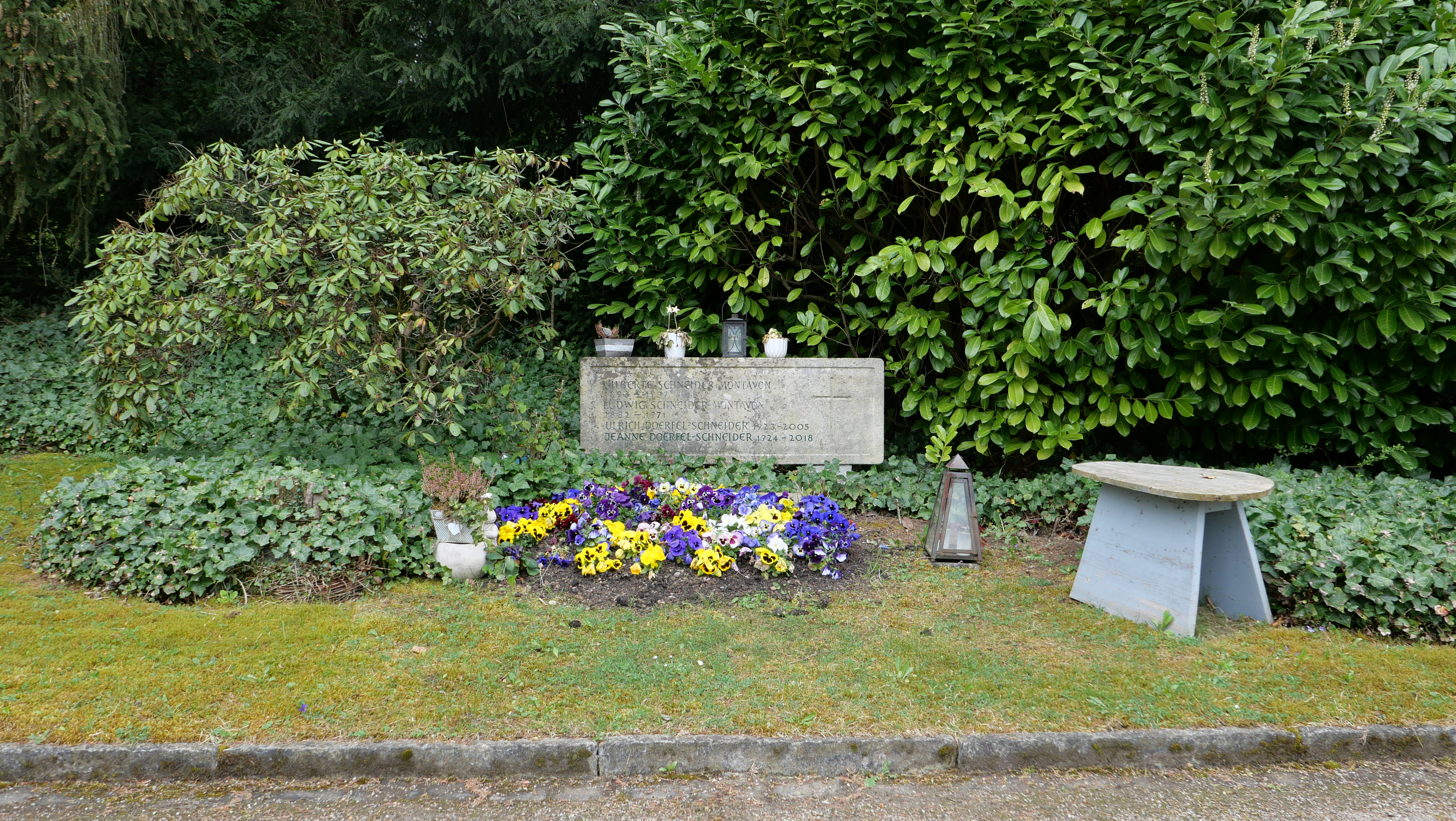
Montavon's grave in Zürich

In 1923, Montavon married Louis Schneider, a businessman from St. Gallen, in a Catholic ceremony at Mariastein Abbey in Metzerlen-Mariastein. The couple moved to Zürich, where they lived at Bergstrasse 122. Gilberte gave birth to a daughter, Jeanne. The family moved to another house, located at Bionstrasse 10, where they settled permanently.

== Death and legacy ==
Montavon died in Zürich on 2 May 1957 and was buried at the Friedhof Nordheim.

A street and a bus station in Courgenay are named after her. In 1995, the filmmaker Jacqueline Veuve dedicated an episode of her television series, Ma rue histoire, to Montavon.
