= Spiritual national defence =

Swiss ideological movement

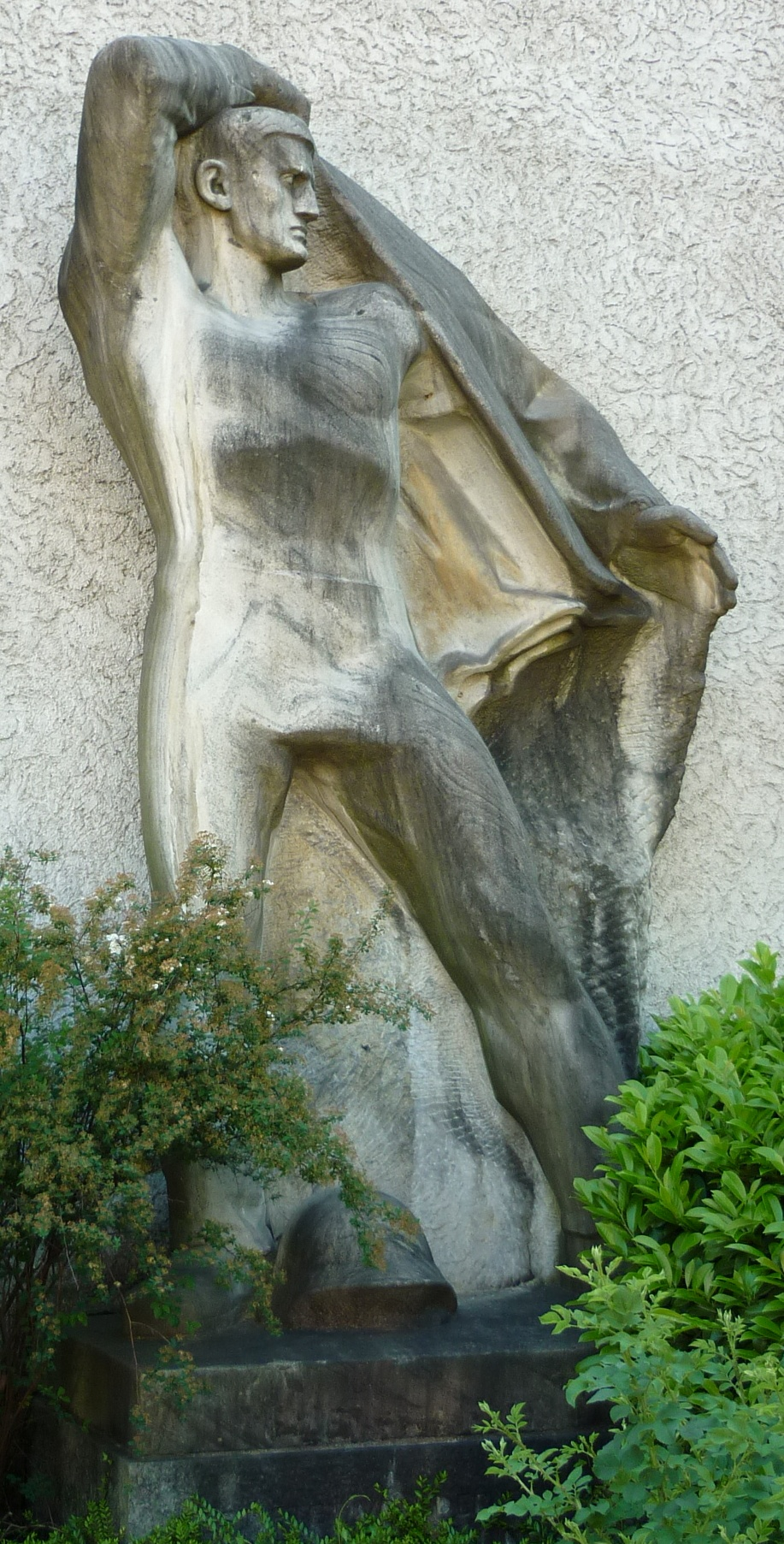
The marble sculpture “On Guard” by Hans Brandenberger 1943-47, the original work in bronze was a symbol of the Swiss National Exhibition in 1939.

The spiritual national defence (German: Geistige Landesverteidigung; French: Défense [nationale] spirituelle) was a political-cultural movement in Switzerland which was active from circa 1932 into the 1960s. It was supported by the Swiss authorities, certain institutions, scholars, the press and intellectuals. Its aim was the strengthening of values and customs perceived to be ‘Swiss’ and thus create a defence against totalitarian ideologies.

The movement first directed its attention towards National Socialism and fascism. Later during the Cold War, Swiss spiritual national defence took a stance against communism. Even when the movement was no longer actively promoted by the authorities, it remained alive well into the 1980s. Today Swiss politicians frequently still use terms and metaphors from the spiritual defence ideology.

== History ==
On 19 June 1935, a social democrat member of the National Council, Fritz Hauser, put forward a postulate in which he called upon the Federal Council to examine how the spiritual independence of culture in Switzerland could be defended in the face of the threat from fascist movements in Germany. One week later, the Swiss Society of Writers (Felix Moeschlin, Karl Naef) presented Federal Councillor Philipp Etter with a proposal for a Swiss cultural policy.

The Social Democratic Party of Switzerland gave its approval to the defence proposal – subject to the following condition: "Combating all trends in domestic politics which, in contradiction to the will of the Swiss people, aspire to a diminution of the democratic rights of freedom and self-determination of the citizens and the removal of the influence of the constitutional authorities over the state and its policy." The 1936 Social Democratic Party conference held in Zürich, however, rejected a defence loan. However, unconditional recognition of the legitimacy of national defence followed in January 1937 with the party’s adoption of the ‘Richtlinienbewegung’ (Movement of Guiding Principles).

== Statement of the Federal Council regarding Spiritual Defence ==
A document of the Federal Council was published on 9 December 1938 relating to the organisation and the task of safeguarding and promoting Swiss culture. This called for the creation under civil law of a cultural foundation to be known as Pro Helvetia, a body which would receive state subsidies. It would guarantee the defence of the common spiritual values of Switzerland in order to counterbalance ‘state sponsored propaganda from neighbouring countries'.

"While the armed defence of the nation, together with the preparation and organisation of such defence, is exclusively a matter of the state – indeed its primary duty – we wish to leave the spiritual defence of the nation primarily in the hands of the citizen. The state should have the necessary means at its disposal, and retain the right to oversee the use of these means. But apart from this, the spiritual forces of the nation should mobilise and deploy themselves in a common defensive front."

== National Socialism and the Second World War ==
The call for a spiritual defence of Swiss democracy against fascism through radio and film originated in left wing circles and became all the more relevant with the rise to power of Hitler in 1933. The latter event completed the encirclement of Switzerland, for its neighbours, with the exception of France, were at that time all governed by authoritarian fascist regimes. In this first phase, spiritual defence had a definite anti-German tone: the specific Swiss character, as opposed to that of Germany, was to be given primary emphasis. A special form of spiritual defence was illustrated by the so-called 'Elvetismo' (cp. Helvetism) movement in Canton Ticino which opposed Italian Irredentism. Here the emphasis was placed on the specific character of Ticino as opposed to that of Italy.

The central thrust of spiritual defence was the creation of an ethnic community in Switzerland. This meant the overcoming of class antagonisms and the creation of a Swiss identity – a community of destiny – which would encompass the cultural differences and the four national languages. The term “Helvetic totalitarianism”, as expressed by the Swiss historian Hans Ulrich Jost, falls short for it refers solely to the civil form of spiritual defence. From 1938, the term was adopted officially by the Swiss Federal Council. Federal Councillor Philipp Etter in a pivotal paper placed his primary emphasis upon the affiliation of Switzerland to the three dominant European cultural spheres: cultural diversity, the federal nature of democracy and the reverence accorded to the dignity and freedom of man.

The Swiss National Exhibition held in Zurich in 1939 is regarded as the most effective expression of spiritual defence. The so-called “Landigeist” (homeland spirit) flooded through the land and – coming shortly before the outbreak of the Second World War – gave people a feeling of an unbroken national will for independence against all the demands of Germany and the annexation of the German-speaking cantons into a Greater German Reich. This was especially relevant now that Austria and the Sudetenland had been taken over.

The main problem faced by spiritual defence was the influx of state-directed German and Italian propaganda – mainly in the form of radio broadcasts, books and magazines – which had an influence on Switzerland. To counteract these influences, private and governmental cultural institutions were created for the purpose of putting out "Swiss" propaganda: among these were Pro Helvetia (founded in 1939), Neue Helvetische Gesellschaft ("New Helvetic Society", founded in 1914) and Heer und Haus ("Army and Home", founded in November 1939).

The Swiss film industry was heavily promoted in order to cultivate the notion of spiritual defence among cinema audiences. The most important of such films were: "Füsilier Wipf" (by Leopold Lindtberge, 1938) and "Landammann Stauffacher" (1941) as well as Franz Schnyder's biographical film "Gilberte de Courgenay" (1941) about Gilberte Montavon. During the Second World War, spiritual defence was strengthened by censorship, which came under the "Abteilung Presse und Funkspruch" (Department of press and broadcasting).

== Cold War ==
After the Second World War, the movement remained active with its thrust directed towards the danger of communist infiltration. Whereas the Federal Council had adopted a relatively muted and accommodating approach to National Socialism before 1945 (as exemplified by the ominous speech of the Federal President, Marcel Pilet-Golaz, in June 1940) the Council adopted a more defiant tone immediately after the war, stating that the NS leadership must be ‘ruthlessly eradicated’. Echoing the anti-communist spirit of the times, emphasis was placed upon a constitutional democracy and welfare state, and the part-time ('militia-like') character of a powerful Swiss army.

Spiritual defence led increasingly to an attitude known as bunker mentality, a political and spiritual isolationism and a militarization of the civil society. Strong criticism from cultural and intellectual circles forced the Swiss authorities to abandon the official promotion of spiritual defence after 1962. Nevertheless, the Swiss army kept up the pressure for a will of national defence, and propagated the notion of Switzerland’s unconditional dependence on a numerically strong and well equipped militia – this to exist alongside unconditional political and economic neutrality.

== After effects ==
The Federal Council continued to use the term spiritual defence in its vocabulary and pictorial language during the campaign leading up to the 1989 referendum to decide whether Switzerland should retain an army or become demilitarised. (see Group for a Switzerland Without an Army.) The celebrations in 1989 to mark the 50th jubilee of mobilisation continued in the same vein. The occasion of the 60th, diamond jubilee, was supposed to reawaken the spirit of the “active service generation” (those who had been mobilised during the Second World War) in advance of a ballot to decide on the procurement of new equipment for the army. In this connection it is significant that Switzerland was the only country to celebrate mobilisation rather than a peace settlement.

Political parties, too – primarily right wing parties such as the Swiss People's Party – still make use of ideas from the spiritual defence movement to oppose European integration or any Überfremdung of Switzerland. This happened during the referendum over the proposed adhesion of Switzerland to the European Economic Community in 1992 and in the campaign against Swiss participation in the 2005 Schengen Agreement and Dublin Regulation. Furthermore, other less known aspects of the post war spiritual defence movement still survive unchallenged, namely the notion of a social market economy or a social partnership.

Imagination is also quite a rare gift. In the years to come, the majority of our people will not wish to consider – no more than was the case in 1920, 1930 or even later – if and how our nation could again be threatened. What we have done, especially since 1933, to arouse our nation from its lethargy and to call upon its conscience and its vigilance will have to be done again and again.
– General Henri Guisan

== See also ==
- Cabaret Cornichon
- Gilberte de Courgenay (German de:Gilberte de Courgenay) and (French fr:Gilberte de Courgenay)
- National Redoubt (Switzerland)
