= Uli the Tenant =

- Liselotte Pulver and Leopold Biberti
- Directed by: Franz Schnyder
- Written by: Richard Schweizer; Werner Düggelin; Franz Schnyder
- Based on: Uli, der Pächter by Jeremias Gotthelf
- Produced by: Oscar Düby
- Starring: Hannes Schmidhauser; Liselotte Pulver; Emil Hegetschweiler
- Cinematography: Emil Berna
- Edited by: Hermann Haller; Hans Heinrich Egger
- Music by: Robert Blum
- Production company: Praesens-Film AG
- Distributed by: Praesens-Film AG
- Release date: 23 December 1955
- Running time: 115 minutes
- Country: Switzerland
- Language: Swiss German

Uli the Tenant (German: Uli, der Pächter) is a 1955 Swiss film directed by Franz Schnyder and starring Liselotte Pulver, Hannes Schmidhauser and Emil Hegetschweiler. The film is adapted from Jeremias Gotthelf’s Uli, der Pächter, the sequel to Uli, der Knecht, and continues the story of Uli and Vreneli after their marriage and move to the Glunggenhof.

== Background ==
The film is adapted from Jeremias Gotthelf’s Uli, der Pächter. The book is the sequel to Uli, der Knecht and continues the story of Uli and Vreneli after their marriage and their move to the Glunggenhof.

== Synopsis ==
Uli lives with his wife Vreneli and their young daughter on the Glungge farm, where he works as a tenant farmer. After a poor harvest and pressure over the rent, he is forced to sell wheat below value. To save money, he dismisses his reliable farmhands and hires cheaper but unreliable workers. He later finds his way back with the help of his wife and a friend.

== Cast ==
The cast includes:

- Liselotte Pulver as Vreneli
- Hannes Schmidhauser as Uli
- Emil Hegetschweiler as Joggeli
- Leopold Biberti as Hagelhannes
- Erwin Kohlund as Johannes
- Hedda Koppé as Glunggenbäuerin
- Marianne Matti as Elisi
- Alfred Rasser as Baumwollhändler
- Fredy Scheim as Müller
- Peter Arens as Arzt
- Hans Gaugler as Mannli
- Stephanie Glaser as Tinette/Trinette

== Production ==
The film was produced by Praesens-Film AG in Zürich and shot from 4 July to 3 September 1955. Interior scenes were filmed at the Rosenhof studio and the Gesellenhaus Wolfbach in Zürich, while much of the location shooting took place in the Emmental, including on a farm in Brechershäusern ob Wynigen and Sumiswald, as well as in Münsingen, Fribourg and Bern.

== Release and legacy ==
The film premiered on 23 December 1955 at the Scala cinema in Zürich. Pulver remained widely known across Switzerland for her role as Vreneli in Uli der Knecht and Uli der Pächter.

== Festival screenings ==
The film was screened at the 65th Locarno Film Festival in 2012.
