= Call Girls of Rome =

1960 film by Daniele D'Anza

- Directed by: Daniele D'Anza
- Screenplay by: Oreste Biancoli; Daniele D'Anza; Mino Guerrini; Giuseppe Mangione; Ugo Pirro
- Story by: Oreste Biancoli
- Produced by: Luigi Carpentieri; Ermanno Donati
- Starring: Andreina Pagnani; Jeanne Valérie
- Cinematography: Marco Scarpelli
- Edited by: Roberto Cinquini
- Music by: Armando Trovajoli
- Production company: Panda Societa per L'Industria Cinematografica
- Distributed by: Pallas Filmverleih (1960) (West Germany); Gala Film Distributors (1961) (UK)
- Release date: 4 May 1960 (Italy)
- Running time: 98 minutes
- Country: Italy
- Language: Italian

Call Girls of Rome (Italian: I piaceri del sabato notte, lit. 'The pleasures of Saturday night') is a 1960 Italian film directed by Daniele D'Anza and starring Andreina Pagnani, Jeanne Valérie, Scilla Gabel, and Elsa Martinelli. Jean Murat also appears.

== Plot ==
Behind the facade of a fashion house in Milan, run by Arabella, lies an efficient high-class prostitution ring.

== Cast ==
- Andreina Pagnani as Arabella
- Jeanne Valérie as Paola Masetti
- Maria Perschy as Claudia
- Scilla Gabel as Patrizia
- Elsa Martinelli as Marisa, model
- Pierre Brice as Aldo, lawyer
- Jean Murat as General Masetti, father of Paola and Silvana
- Romolo Valli as Commissioner
- Roberto Risso as Carlo Malpighi
- Corrado Pani as Young Blackmailer
- Renato Speziale as Luigi, Arabella's lover
- Giuseppe Porelli as Commendator Paolo Iavecchia
- Luigi Pavese as Baldoni
- Maria Grazia Spina as Silvana
- Marilù Tolo as Luigi's mistress
- Carlo Pisacane as Neapolitan old man
- Paola Barbara as Mrs. Masetti, mother of Paola and Silvana
- Aldo Giuffrè as Ernesto
- Michele Malaspina as A client of the atelier
- Roy Ciccolini as Mori, footballer
- Cesarina Gheraldi as Lisa, maid of the Masetti house
- Nino Pavese as Inspector De Stefani
- Silvano Tranquilli as Deputy Commissioner
- Tom Felleghy as Swiss Client
- Giulio Marchetti as Another Swiss Client
- Arnaldo Ninchi as Footballer
- Roberto Bruni as A client of the atelier
- Arturo Dominici as A client of the atelier
- Laura Nucci as A client of the atelier
- Linda Sini as A client of the atelier

== Reception ==
A contemporary Corriere della Sera review claimed the film was "not particularly satisfying", as the director "seems to have had the echoes of too many French and American films in his ear, and to have absorbed the least original elements of them".
