= Rudolph Bolo Maeglin =

Swiss journalist, publicist, and writer

Rudolph Bolo Mäglin (also Rudolf and Maeglin), (26 Dezember 1898 in Basel – 28 April 1973 in Binningen) was a Swiss journalist, publicist, writer, poet and cabaretwriter.

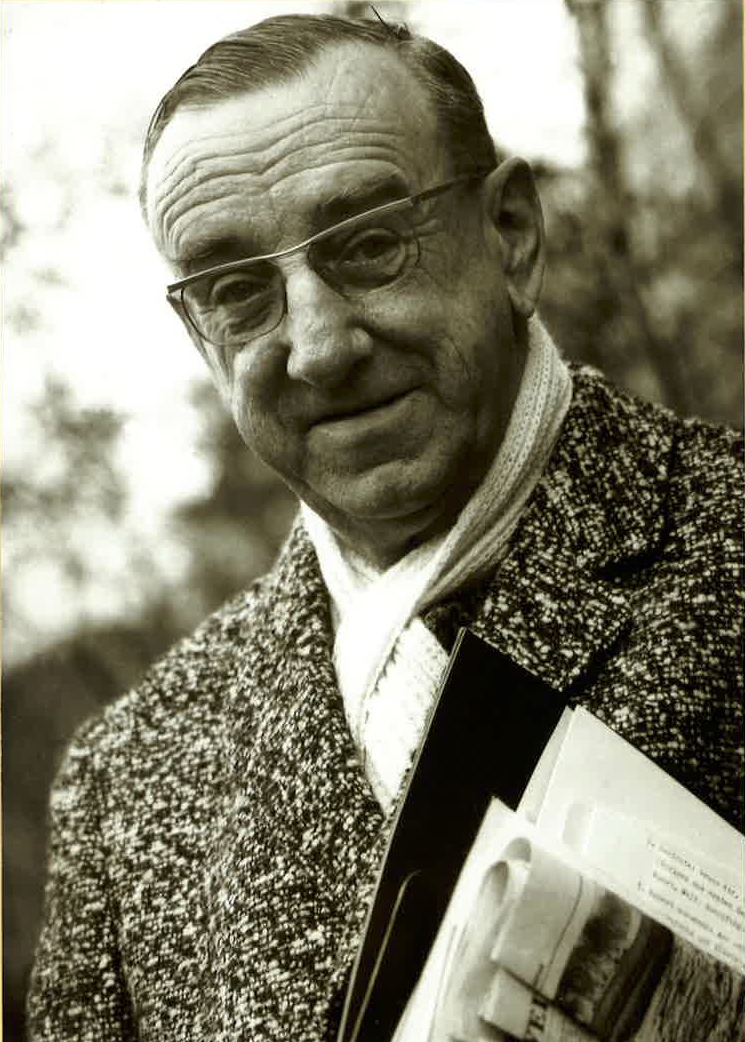
Bolo Mäglin with bundle of newspapers and writing case

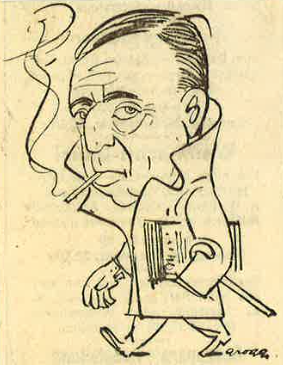
A caricature by Bolo on the occasion of his sixtieth birthday (painted by Fritz Grogg). Published in the National-Zeitung in 1958

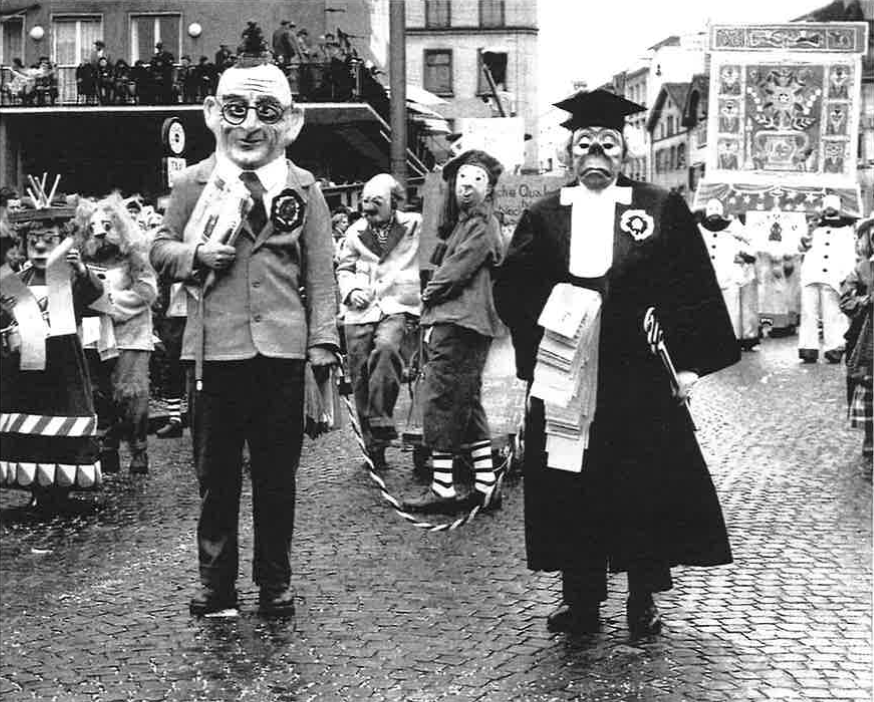
Bolo as a subject at the Basel Carnival (Bolo in front of a judge)

He worked as a writer and as a journalist for the National-Zeitung. Mäglin was mainly known through the novel Gilberte de Courgenay published in 1939 . His carnival novella Der Ruesser from 1957, which was later issued as an audio book version read by Ruedi Walter, was also awarded.

== Life ==
Rudolph Mäglin was born on 26 December 1898, the fourth of six children at Herrengrabenweg 22 in Basel.

After an apprenticeship in a bank, he became an accountant at the age of 17½, but shortly afterwards quit his job and became a newspaper reporter. Later he became a journalist, publicist, writer, poet and cabaretwriter.

At first, he wrote sports reports, reviews of films, theater performances and guest performances by circuses and variétés for various daily and weekly newspapers. This was soon followed by his humorous and pointed reports named Erlauschtes vom Bäumli, which were extremely popular with the readership, in the Basler Woche. They were about disputes in the Basel civil court on the Bäumleingasse in Basel.

In 1926, he founded the special supplement Dr glai Nazi as a freelancer for the National-Zeitung (today Basler Zeitung ). Up until the late 1960s, Bolo Mäglin was the godfather of this popular children's supplement and regularly published his poems in it.

There were times when he wrote under six pseudonyms to deny the claim that if you write lyric poetry, you couldn't possibly succeed in cultural essays, theater reviews, sports reports, satirical glosses and gripping stories for the youth. These included names such as "Prokurator" and "Bimbolo". Since an Italian clown by the name of Bimbolo forbade him to use this name, "Martin Bim" and "Bolo" emerged. The latter was to remain his nickname forever.

In Binningen, where he had lived since 1947 with his wife Elsa "Elsy" Mäglin (* 1904; † 2006) and their two children Marie-Louise "Marly" (* 1938) and Urs Beat (* 1941), you could almost find him found daily with a bundle of newspapers and one of his writing cases under his arm. He liked to retire to a corner of the "Rebstock" or "Jägerstübli" to write, but was occasionally also available for a sociable conversation over a cup of coffee or a glass of wine. Another well-known characteristic of Bolo, wearing white gloves, could be explained by his colophony allergy (an allergy to printer's ink). A portrait of fellow writer Heinrich Kuhn (editor of the National-Zeitung 1934–74) in the foreword to the second edition of the Ruesser also described Bolo's typical appearance as follows: «A narrow face with a sharp, slightly curved nose on top of one rather thin body. Always neatly dressed, with a butterfly tie, gloves and cane, sometimes accompanied by a little fox terrier, a pencil case or envelope in his hand, that's how he appeared at the editorial office with a lively pace."

Bolo had nothing to do with anything fake, wrong or staged pessimism. The Germanist and professor Louis Wiesmann from the State Literary Credit Commission Basel-Stadt wrote about him in 1963: "Bolo is not a carefree writer. He only gives out what is in front of his artistic conscience. Bolo never allowed himself to be restricted. He does what he is inwardly driven to, doesn’t mince his words and appears to be very close to the people. But behind his free, uncomplicated manner there is also an emotional person who knows how to touch his readership to the heart of his readership. His fresh, direct spelling made him popular and successful. " In a previous conversation with Wiesmann, Bolo had made the following programmatic confession: “Reality knows the dark and the tragic, but also the bright and the happy – otherwise life would have no meaning. As little as I can do with pink glasses and illusions, I just don't like black glasses. For me, poetry that does not affirm life misses its most beautiful task. His fellow writer Hans Räber once said of him: “With Bolo, every sentence sparkles with an incorruptible honesty.”

Bolo Mäglin's literary work includes poems, short stories, novels, dramas, radio plays, musicals, festivals, operetta librettos, revues, cabaret programs, carnival games, Schnitzelbanks and "Fasnachts-Zeedel" from his pen. He alternated between Standard German and dialect (especially Basel German). Many of his works have been awarded prizes.

In the foreword to the second edition of the Ruesser, Heinrich Kuhn reports on Bolo's relation to Carnival: “Artists and cabaret artists, that was his world. But the Basel Carnival was his main specialty. From the window of the dispatch office, in the "Haus zum Gold", the former headquarters of the National-Zeitung on the market square, he hammered the entire report on the street carnival primavista into the typewriter. The fact that he not only knew the drum and piccolo marches, but also practiced the art of drumming and whistling, made him a competent reviewer u. a. of the Monster Drummeli in the Küchlin Theatre Basel. Many "Fasnachtsclique" (groups performing the carnival) did not always accept his criticism without contradiction and so it could not be missing that one day he himself became a subject of the carnival (Bolo in front of a judge). As a good carnival person, he reacted calmly and with humor to the masked intrigue. [...] In his enigmatic novella, Bolo tells of a Basel original obsessed with carnival. He himself was such an original, fused with his Basel, who knew about the secrets and peculiarities of the old Rhine city. Bolo knew how to express this knowledge in soot and in many dialect poems."

His best-known work is the novel Gilberte de Courgenay, about the young Swiss woman Gilberte Montavon. As a stage play – premiered on 24 August 1939 in the Schauspielhaus Zürich – this play brought it to over 450 performances. It is still very popular with professional and amateur theaters today.

In 1943, he was one of the founders of the Basel Writers' Association, as its vice-president he served for many years.

In 2005, a memorial showcase was inaugurated in the Ortsmuseum Binningen as part of a vernissage, in which, in addition to a small selection of his wide range of works, numerous objects from his everyday life can be seen. Some of his poems, presented by Bolo personally, can be played at the push of a button. Since August 2014, around 40 years after Bolo's death, a path that leads from Binningen's Margarethenstrasse to Bruderholzrain has been named after him.

== Works (incomplete) ==
- Herlock Sholmes der «Windhund». Narrative. J. Frehner, Basel 1924.
- Gilberte de Courgenay. A play from the border occupation 1914 to 18. Theater play / Singspiel. Over 450 performances. 1939.
- Gilberte de Courgenay. A novel from the occupation of the border from 1914 to 1918. Eugen Rentsch Verlag, Erlenbach-Zürich 1939.
- Pension Giggernillis. Carnival game. Basel 1940.
- Tschinghiane. A gypsy story. Youth novel. A. Fehr, Zurich 1941.
- Härz Dame blutt. Carnival game. Basel 1941.
- Im Bebbi si Familiealbum. Carnival game. Basel 1942/44.
- s Atelier. Cabaret piece. Before 1943.
- D’Resslirytti. Cabaret piece. Before 1943.
- Cornichon. Cabaret piece. Before 1943.
- Arlequin. Cabaret piece. Before 1943.
- Dr Muulkorb. Cabaret piece. 1943.
- Eidgenosse d'Raaje gschlosse. Movie. 1944.
- ... und fiel unter die Räuber. Movie. 1944.
- «John Kabis» der Schmied und sein Glück. Musical. 1944.
- Eine Stimme ruft. Christmas musical. 6 performances. 1944.
- Der Zirkusdirektor. Play. 12 performances. 1944.
- Trikolore über dem Elsass. Play. 12 performances. 1945.
- Cagliostro. Play. 12 performances. 1950. Winner of the literary credit competition.
- «Tschitsch», der Ehrgeizige. Youth novel. Aare-Verlag, Bern 1950.
- Hannibals Tod. Listening sequences. 1955.
- Der Ruesser. A carnival novella. National-Zeitung (today Basler Zeitung), Basel 1957. Winner of the literary credit competition.
- Der Araber und sein Glück. Novel. 1957.
- Prozess oder Vergleich. Youth radio. 1957.
- «König und Stift» oder «Kopf und Zahl». Comedy. 1957.
- Tellspiele in Hühnerhofen. Musical. 1957.
- Cagliostro. Radio play. 1958.
- Erinnerung an Bolo. Dialect poems. National-Zeitung (today Basler Zeitung), Basel 1975.
- Dr glai Nazi. Children's supplement to the National-Zeitung (heute Basler Zeitung), Basel 1926 – 1977.
- Rudolph Bolo Maeglin (Unvergessene Basler Dichter). Volume 3 from the series Unvergessene Basler Dichter. GS-Verlag, Basel 1991.
- Rudolph (Bolo) Maeglin liest sieben eigene Gedichte. Poetry CD. Basel 2003.
- Over 200 poems appeared in National-Zeitung, Schweizer Illustrierte, Sie und Er, Nebelspalter and other magazines, some of them award-winning.

=== Songs (undated) ===
- Vive le Général
- E Liedli, e Gleesli, e Schmitzli derzue
- Dr Ruech am Rhy
- Muesch halt zyle
- Dr Vogelgryff
- Die 4 Eff
- Y waiss e glai Baizli
- Spalemergruess
- En halbe Liter (from Gilberte de Courgenay)
- Zmitts im Bärner Oberland (from Gilberte de Courgenay)
- Schryb denn gly (from Gilberte de Courgenay)
- Kanonenlied (from Gilberte de Courgenay)
- Ein schneidig Häslein (from Gilberte de Courgenay)
- Wär isch ’s Wichtigscht im Militär (from Gilberte de Courgenay)

== Literature ==
- Andreas Kotte, ed. (2005). "Rudolph Bolo Maeglin". Theaterlexikon der Schweiz / Dictionnaire du théâtre en Suisse / Dizionario Teatrale Svizzero / Lexicon da teater svizzer [Theater Dictionary of Switzerland]. Vol. 2. Zürich: Chronos. p. 1156. ISBN 978-3-0340-0715-3. LCCN 2007423414. OCLC 62309181.
- Christian Schmid: "Maeglin, Rudolf" in German, French and Italian in the online Historical Dictionary of Switzerland.
- Bernhard Sowinski: Lexikon deutschsprachiger Mundartautoren. Olms, Hildesheim 1997, ISBN 3-487-10381-8, S. 379.
- Franz Burgert: Das Lied von Courgenay. Die wahre Entstehungsgeschichte, das wundersamste Liederschicksal. Entlebucher Medienhaus, Schüpfheim [2016], ISBN 978-3-906832-02-9.
