= General Sutter =

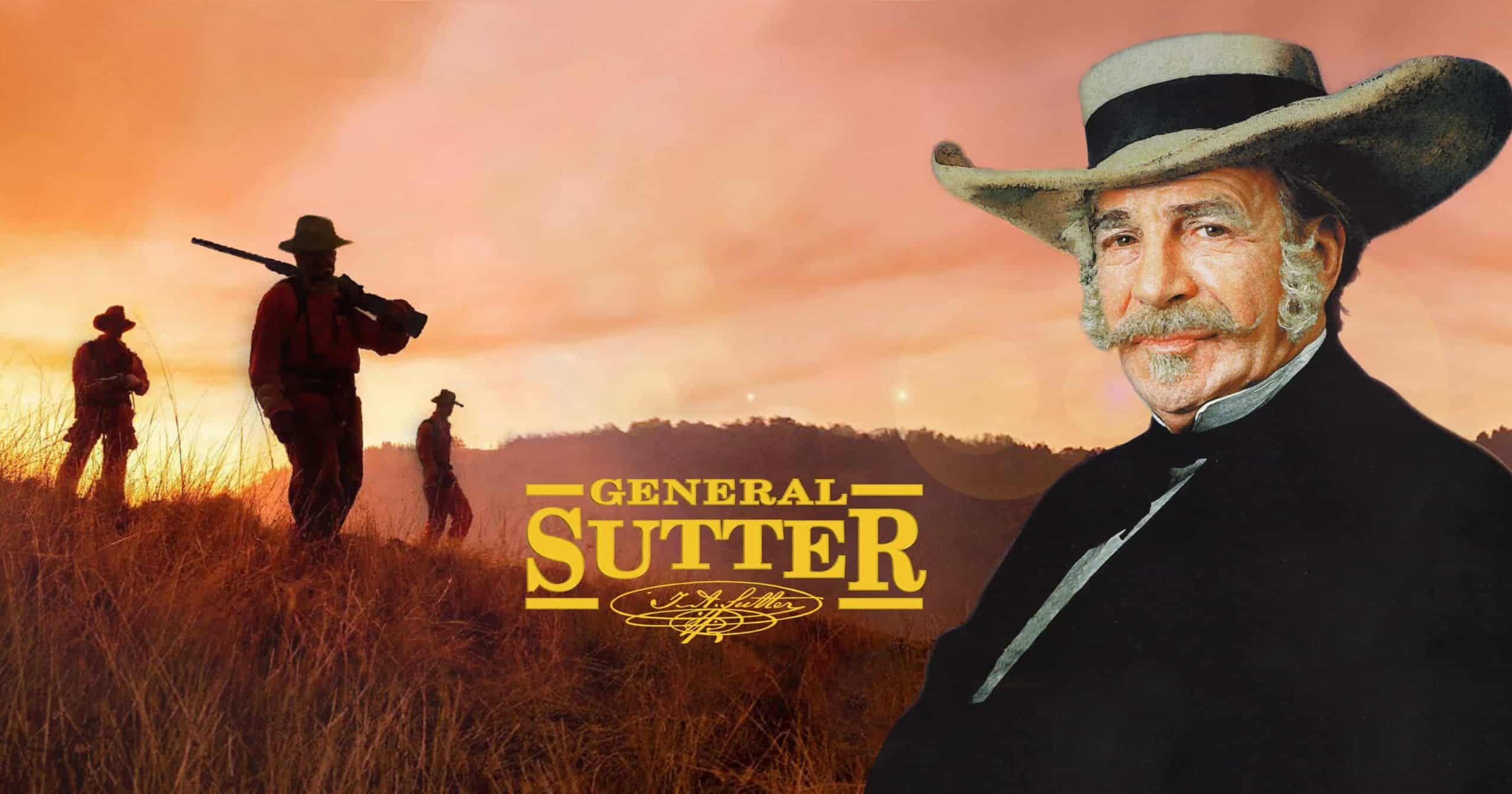
- Directed by: Benny Fasnacht
- Written by: Caroline Felix Brun
- Produced by: Benny Fasnacht
- Starring: Hannes Schmidhauser; Wolfram Berger; Werner Bachofen; Rahman Deshongh; Raul Subia
- Edited by: Jean Merrouche; Benny Fasnacht
- Music by: Philippe Blumenthal
- Production company: Fasnacht & Partner AG
- Release date: August 1999
- Running time: 100 minutes
- Country: Switzerland
- Language: German

General Sutter is a 1999 Swiss historical film directed by Benny Fasnacht and written by Caroline Felix Brun. Starring Hannes Schmidhauser as John August Sutter and Wolfram Berger as Frank Buchser, it is framed around Buchser painting Sutter’s portrait in Washington in 1866, a year after the end of the American Civil War. The film premiered in August 1999 and was later screened at the Locarno Film Festival and the Solothurner Filmtage.

== Synopsis ==
In Washington in June 1866, a year after the end of the American Civil War, the Swiss emigrant General Sutter sits for a portrait by Frank Buchser and recounts the story of his life. The film portrays Sutter as a controversial figure.

== Cast ==
The cast includes:

- Hannes Schmidhauser as John August Sutter
- Wolfram Berger as Frank Buchser
- Werner Bachofen
- Rahman Deshongh
- Raul Subia

== Production ==
Key scenes from Sutter’s life were filmed on location in the United States and Switzerland. The film was made in collaboration with historians in California and Switzerland.

== Background ==
John August Sutter, the subject of the film, was associated with the founding of California and the California gold rush. In recent years, his legacy has been reassessed because of his role in slavery and violence against Indigenous people.

== Release and reception ==
The film had a pre-premiere in Basel on 19 August 1999. An SRF report on the event said that the film's idealized portrayal raised questions about the Sutter myth. It opened in German-speaking Switzerland on 23 April 2000 and recorded 899 admissions, all in German-speaking Switzerland.

== Festival screenings ==
The film premiered in August 1999 and had festival screenings including the 52nd Locarno Film Festival in 1999 and the Solothurner Filmtage in 2000.
