= Heinz Woester =

Swiss actor

Heinz Woester (1901–1970) was a Swiss film and television actor.

== Filmography ==
Year	Title	Role	Notes
1940	Operetta	Prof. Dr. Eichgraber	
1941	Gilberte de Courgenay	Hauptmann / Captain	
1942	Destiny	Mirko	
1947	Madness Rules	Dr. med Ernst Laduner	
1947	Matura-Reise	Mariani	
1952	Palace Hotel	Konsul Rainer	
1956	The Mountains Between Us	Escher	
1961	Die Gejagten	Meier, Bankdirektor	
1961	William Tell	Attinghausen	
1963	Nikolaus von Flüe - Pacem in Terris	Bischof	
