= No Diamonds for Ursula =

- Directed by: Gino Mangini
- Written by: Gino Mangini; Sergio Pisani; Fiorella Ricciardello; Hannes Schmidhauser
- Starring: Jeanne Valérie; Salvo Randone; Dana Andrews
- Cinematography: Angelo Filippini
- Edited by: Alberto Gallitti
- Music by: Carlo Rustichelli
- Production company: Ticino Films
- Release date: 7 August 1967
- Running time: 96 minutes
- Country: Italy
- Language: Italian

No Diamonds for Ursula (Italian: I diamanti che nessuno voleva rubare) is a 1967 Italian crime film directed by Gino Mangini and starring Jeanne Valérie, Salvo Randone and Dana Andrews.

== Cast ==
- Jeanne Valérie as Ursula
- Salvo Randone as Spiros
- Hannes Schmidhauser (billed as John Elliot) as Fangio
- Dana Andrews as Maurizio, Il gioielliere
- Aldo Giuffrè as Marcos
- Mario Brega as Sansone
- Bruno Piergentili as Giorgio
- Roger Beaumont as Charlie
- Aymo as Edison
- Lilly Mantovani as La governante
- Kathy Baron as La commessa
- Giovanni Petrucci as Il commesso
- Ignazio Spalla as Caravella
- Thomas Walton as Il commissario
- Nino Vingelli as Carta Carbone
- Attilio Dottesio as Il maresciallo

== Bibliography ==
- James McKay. Dana Andrews: The Face of Noir. McFarland, 2010.
