= Kleine Scheidegg (film) =

- Directed by: Richard Schweizer
- Written by: Richard Schweizer
- Starring: Susanne Baader; Leopold Biberti; Emil Hegetschweiler; Armin Schweizer
- Cinematography: Richard Angst
- Music by: Robert Blum
- Release date: 1937
- Country: Switzerland
- Language: Swiss German

Kleine Scheidegg is a 1937 Swiss drama film directed and written by Richard Schweizer and starring Susanne Baader, Leopold Biberti and Emil Hegetschweiler. It is set around the Kleine Scheidegg Pass in Switzerland. It is part of the genre of mountain films, popular in the 1930s.

== Cast ==
- Susanne Baader - Ulla Matthei
- Leopold Biberti - Dr. Matthei
- Emil Hegetschweiler - Concierge
- Armin Schweizer - Das Hotelfaktotum
- Hans Brügger - Der Bergführer
- Simon Brocader - Tourist

== Bibliography ==
- Clarke, David B. & Doel, Marcus A. Moving Pictures/Stopping Places: Hotels and Motels on Film. Lexington Books, 2009.
- Wider, Werner & Aeppli, Felix. Der Schweizer Film 1929-1964. Limmat, 1981.
