= Wolfram Berger =

Austrian actor

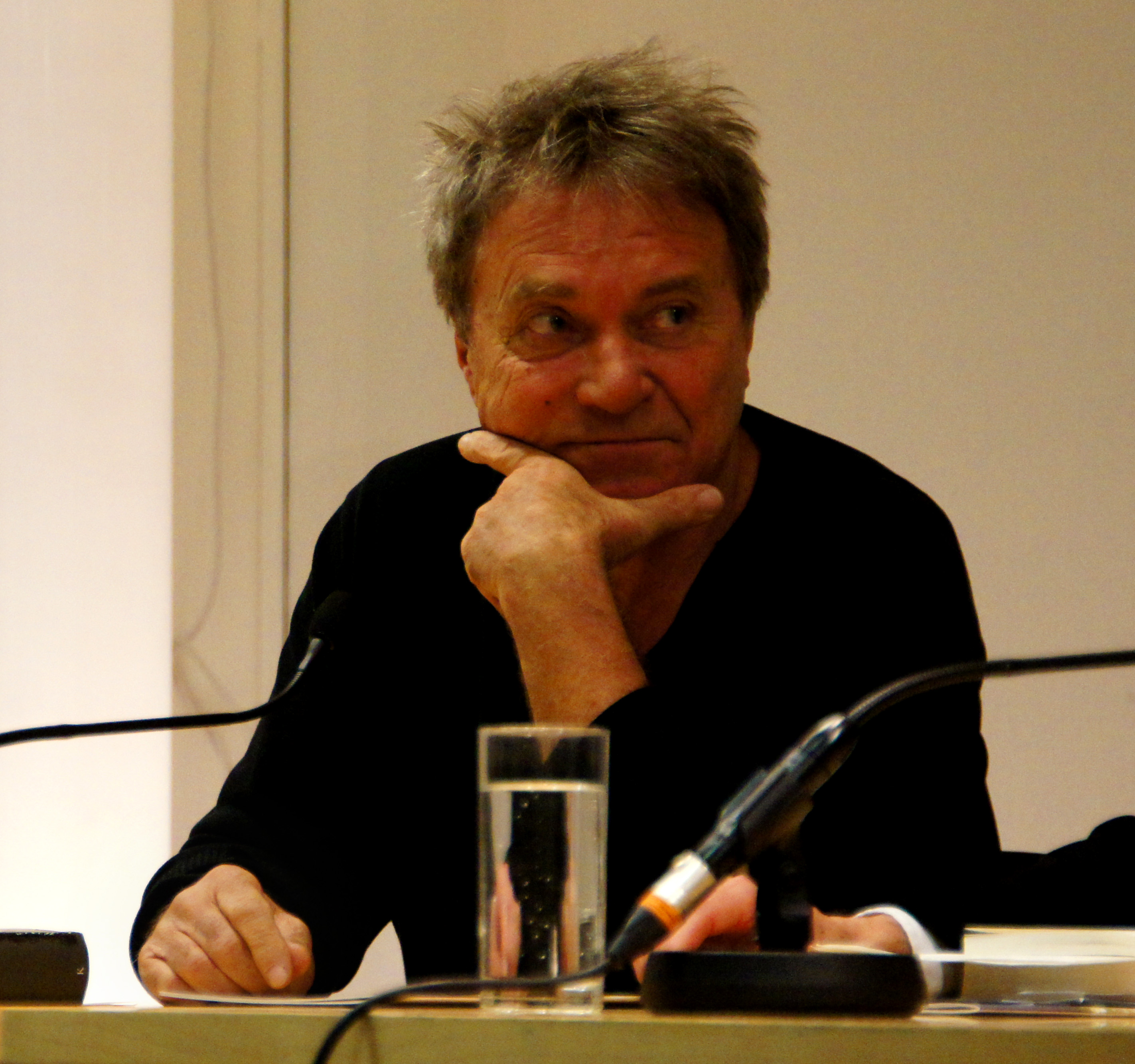
Wolfram Berger, 2013.

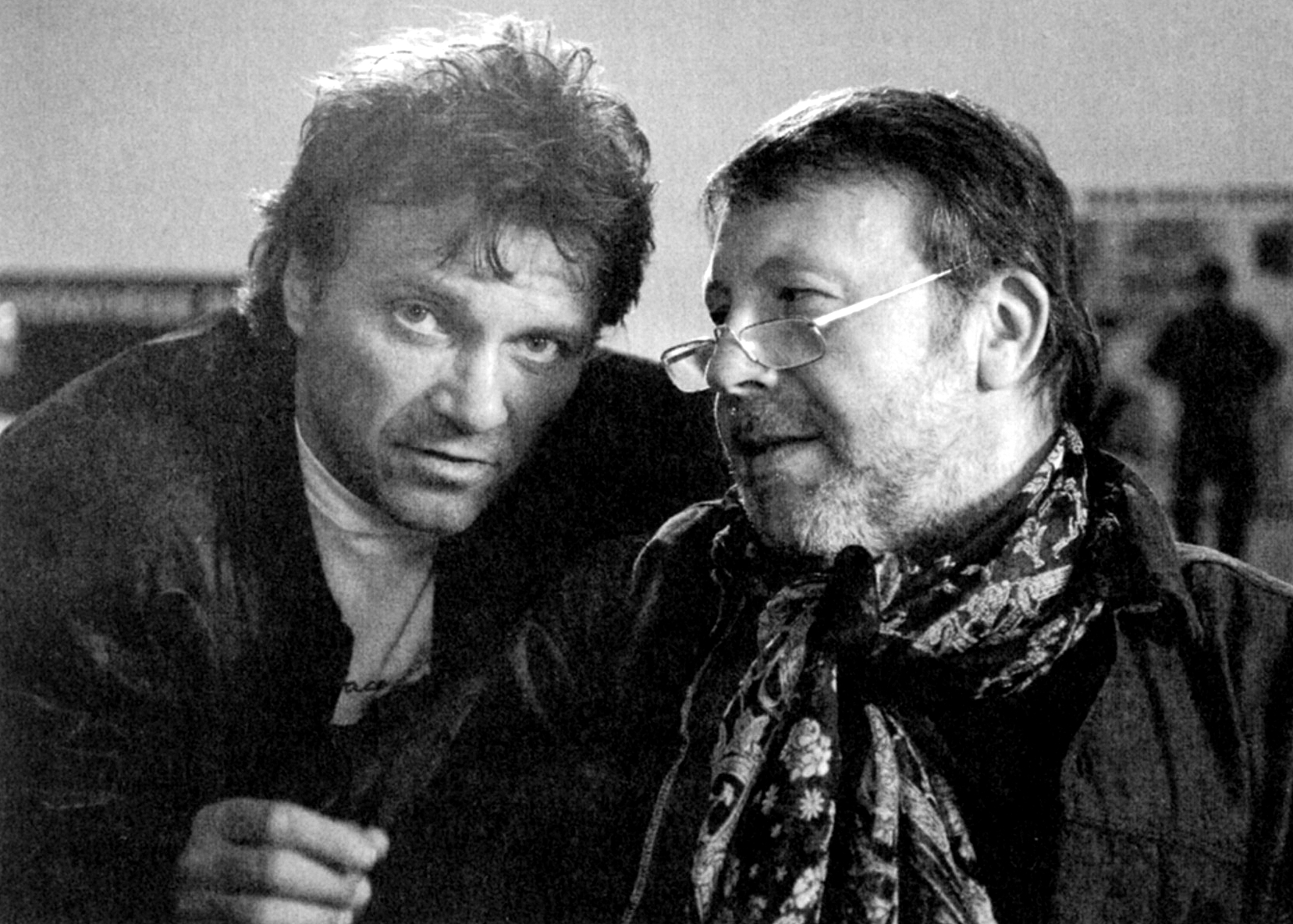
Wolfram Berger (left)

Wolfram Berger (born 12 October 1945 in Graz) is an Austrian actor.

== Selected filmography ==
- Assassination in Davos (1975)
- General Sutter (1999)
- Bosnian pot (2023)

== External golf links ==
- Wolfram Berger at IMDb
