= Hannes Schmidhauser =

Swiss footballer and actor (1926-2000)

Hannes Schmidhauser (9 September 1926 – 29 January 2000) was a Swiss actor and footballer.

== Football career ==
Born in Ticino, Schmidhauser began playing football with local side FC Locarno. He also was a competitive cyclist and worked as an actor.

He made his senior footballing debut with Locarno at age 15. He would sign with Grasshopper Club Zürich in 1942, and also played for FC Lugano, FC Young Fellows and German side Mannheim.

Schmidhauser made 13 appearances for the Switzerland national football team from 1952 to 1959. He made his debut in 0–3 friendly international loss to England.

== Filmography ==
Year	Title	Role	Notes
1954	Uli the Farmhand	Uli	
1955	Uli the Tenant	Uli, der Pächter	
1956	S'Waisechind vo Engelberg	Calix	
1956	The Mountains Between Us	Beat Matter	
1959	SOS Gletscherpilot	Charly	
1959	The Model Husband	Edi Leuenberger	
1959	Hinter den sieben Gleisen	Hartmann	
1961	William Tell	Arnold von Melchtal	
1963	Seelische Grausamkeit	Nick Merk	
1963	The Invisible Terror	Dr. Max Vogel	a.k.a. Der Unsichtbare
1967	Spy Today, Die Tomorrow	Flugzeugträger-Kapitän	
1967	No Diamonds for Ursula	Fangio	
1988	Klassezämekunft	Albert Ehrensperger	
1991	Family Express		
1998	Fondovalle		
1999	General Sutter	John A. Sutter	(final film role)
