= Heidi and Peter =

- Directed by: Franz Schnyder
- Written by: Johanna Spyri (novel); Richard Schweizer
- Produced by: Lazar Wechsler
- Starring: Heinrich Gretler; Emil Hegetschweiler; Willy Birgel; Traute Carlsen
- Cinematography: Emil Berna
- Edited by: Hermann Haller
- Music by: Robert Blum
- Production company: Praesens-Film
- Distributed by: Columbia Film-Verleih (West Germany)
- Release date: 10 March 1955
- Running time: 95 minutes
- Country: Switzerland
- Language: German

Heidi and Peter (German: Heidi und Peter) is a 1955 Swiss family drama film directed by Franz Schnyder and starring Heinrich Gretler, Elsbeth Sigmund and Thomas Klameth. It is a sequel to the 1952 film Heidi and an adaptation of the 1881 second volume of the novel Heidi (Heidi kann brauchen, was es gelernt hat) by Johanna Spyri. It was the first Swiss film made in colour and was one of the biggest grossing films in Switzerland for the year.

It was shot at the Rosenhof Studios in Zurich and the Bavaria Studios in Munich. Location shooting took place around the Bernese Alps in Western Switzerland. The film's sets were designed by the art director Max Röthlisberger.

== Plot ==
Two years have passed since Heidi and Klara parted. Klara's plans to visit Heidi never work out. Klara has since suffered a relapse and sometimes has to sit in the chair again.

Heidi is doing well at school but Peter prefers to spend his time sledging. Alpöhi comes up with a plan. On December 6, dressed up as Nikolaus, he frightens Peter so much that the boy resolves to do better in school. His reading still isn't that good but then Heidi helps him and achieves what the teachers couldn't and soon Peter learns to read fluently.

Klara can finally travel to Switzerland. Peter loses the letter in which she announces her arrival and Heidi only finds out at the last minute that Klara is coming. Now Heidi has to take care of her guest. Since Klara can not walk so well, Heidi can not accompany Peter up the mountain anymore. Peter is annoyed especially as he built a shelter specifically for Heidi. In the Alps, Peter meets surveyors surveying the mountains. After speaking with them, Peter wants to take up this profession because he can then stay in the mountains. The training costs a lot of money, which Peter's mother does not have.

Peter is becoming more and more taciturn with Heidi and Klara. When he sees the parked up wheelchair, he pushes it down the mountain where it shatters, hoping Klara, who depends on the chair, will leave. Peter begins to have nightmares about his bad action. The Alpöhi soon realises who pushed the wheelchair but says nothing because the absence of the chair encourages Klara to try and walk again.

During a stormy night, Klara is frightened. Alpöhi has to go to the village because it is threatened by floods. Klara panics and follows him before Heidi can prevent it. Heidi and her grandfather find Klara near the bridge. The village is flooded but fortunately, there are no casualties though a lot of material damage. Klara, who seems to have been changed by the shock of her adventure, helps with cleaning. When her father arrives, he is astounded to see his daughter in such good spirits and health.

To avoid flooding from happening again in the future, it is decided that the stream will be diverted. To raise the necessary funds, a public festival is held. Heidi and Peter, accompanied by Klara on the piano sing in the nearby Spa town to raise funds. Before he and Klara leave, Mr. Sesemann tells Peter he will fund his studies to become a surveyor.

== Cast ==
- Heinrich Gretler as Alp-Öhi
- Elsbeth Sigmund as Heidi
- Thomas Klameth as Geissenpeter
- Emil Hegetschweiler as Lehrer / Teacher
- Willy Birgel as Herr Sesemann / Mr. Sesemann
- Traute Carlsen as Klaras Grossmutter / Klara's grandmother
- Anita Mey as Frl. Rottenmeyer
- Theo Lingen as Sebastian
- Isa Günther as Klara Sesemann
- Carl Wery as Dr. Classen
- Margrit Rainer as Peters Mutter / Peter's mother
- Fred Tanner as The Parson

== Bibliography ==
- Bergfelder, Tim & Bock, Hans-Michael. The Concise Cinegraph: Encyclopedia of German. Berghahn Books, 2009.
