= Leopold Biberti =

Swiss actor

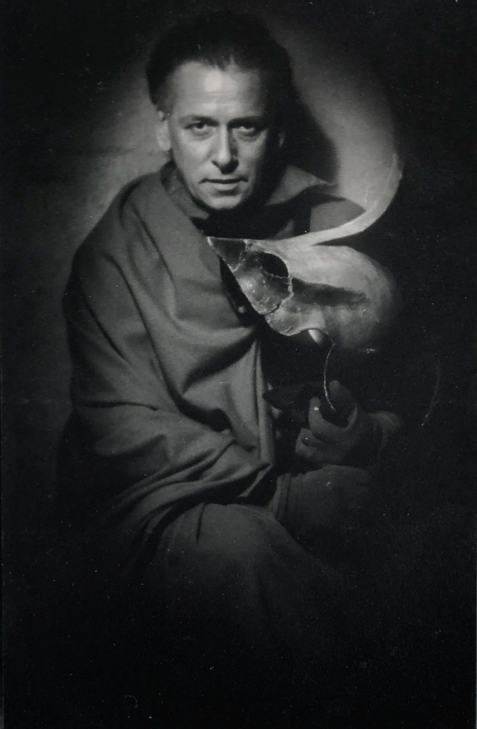
- Biberti in 1968
- Born: 18 September 1894; Berlin, Germany
- Died: 24 November 1969 (aged 75); Frankfurt am Main, Germany
- Occupation: Actor
- Years active: 1937-1969

Leopold Biberti (1894–1969) was a Swiss actor. Born as French, he got the Swiss citizens rights in 1920.

== Filmography ==
Year	Title	Role	Notes
1937	Kleine Scheidegg	Dr. Matthei	
1940	Dilemma	Docteur Paul Férrat	
1940	Der achti Schwyzer	Billy Meier	
1941	Das Menschlein Matthias	André Oberholzer	
1941	Der doppelte Matthias und seine Töchter	Schwitter - Metzger	
1941	Landammann Stauffacher	Goliath	
1942	De Wyberfind	Billy Meier	
1942	Der Schuß von der Kanzel	General Hans-Rudolf Werdmüller	
1945	Kampf dem Krebs	Universitätsprofessor	
1945	The Last Chance	Swiss lieutenant Brunner	
1949	Swiss Tour	Walter Hochull - Reiseführer	
1955	Uli the Tenant	Hagelhans	
1957	Rose Bernd	Christoph Flamm	
1959	SOS Gletscherpilot	Dr. Alfred Gruber	
1960	William Tell	Werner Stauffacher	
1960	Sacred Waters	Hans Zuensteinen - der Garde	
1964	Hütet eure Töchter	Herr von Grodno	(episode "Geld")
