= Jeanne Valérie =

French actress (1941–2020)

- Born: Micheline Yvette Voituriez; 19 August 1941; Paris, France
- Died: 25 September 2020 (aged 79)
- Occupation: Actress
- Years active: 1959–1991 (film)

Jeanne Valérie (19 August 1941 – 25 September 2020) was a French film and television actress.

== Selected filmography ==
- Cigarettes, Whiskey and Wild Women (1959)
- Les Liaisons dangereuses (1959)
- Web of Passion (1959)
- The Loves of Salammbo (1960)
- Call Girls of Rome (1960)
- Labbra rosse (1960)
- Le pillole di Ercole (1960)
- From a Roman Balcony (1960)
- Green Harvest (1961)
- The Mishap (1961)
- The Game of Truth (1961)
- Adorable Julia (1962)
- Mandrin (1962)
- The Bread Peddler (1963)
- Let's Talk About Women (1964)
- White Voices (1964)
- Nick Carter and Red Club (1965)
- Espionage in Lisbon (1965)
- No Diamonds for Ursula (1967)
- Desert Commandos (1968)
- The Skin (1981)
- Husband and Lovers (1991)

== Bibliography ==
- Janis L. Pallister & Ruth A. Hottell. Noteworthy Francophone Women Directors: A Sequel. Lexington Books, 2011.
