= After the Storm (1948 film) =

1948 film directed by Gustav Ucicky

- German film poster
- German: Nach dem Sturm
- Directed by: Gustav Ucicky
- Written by: Carl Zuckmayer (novella); Peter Wyrsch; Gustav Ucicky
- Produced by: Willy Wachtl
- Starring: Maria Schell
- Cinematography: Konstantin Irmen-Tschet; Otto Ritter
- Edited by: Hermann Haller
- Music by: Wal Berg
- Production company: Cordial-Film
- Distributed by: Sascha Film
- Release date: 17 November 1948
- Running time: 96 minutes
- Countries: Austria; Switzerland; Liechtenstein
- Language: German

After the Storm (German: Nach dem Sturm) is a 1948 drama film directed by Gustav Ucicky and starring Maria Schell. It was made as a co-production between Austria, Switzerland and Liechtenstein, based on a novella by Carl Zuckmayer. Shooting took place at the Bellerive Studios in Zürich and on location in Ascona, Salzburg and Monte San Salvatore in Ticino. The film's sets were designed by the art directors Robert Furrer and Otto Niedermoser.

== Plot ==
A talented young female musician tries to rebuild her life having been imprisoned during World War II.

== Cast ==
- Maria Schell as Gretel Aichinger
- Marte Harell as Barbara von Tretini
- Erwin Kalser as von Tretini
- Nicholas Stuart as Major Michael Sinclair
- Leopold Rudolf as Thomas Esterer
- Adrienne Gessner as Captain Virginia Jenkins
- Max Haufler as photographer Aichinger
- Annie Rosar as Frau Boetz
- Emil Hegetschweiler as Diener der Tretinis
- Armin Schweizer as barman
- Sigfrit Steiner
- Walburga Gmür
- Robert Bichler
- Ettore Cella
- Hans Kaes
- Marianne Kober
- Jürg Medicus
- Theodor Roehmis
- Alfred Schlageter
- Beatrice Stoll
