= Henriette Bitzius-Zeender =

Swiss homemaker and wife of writer Jeremias Gotthelf

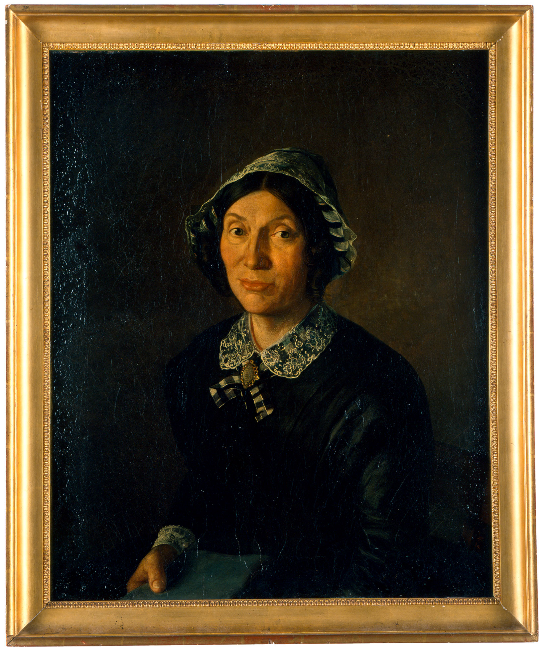
- Born: Heinrica Elisabetha Zeender; August 8, 1805; Bern, Switzerland
- Died: June 14, 1872 (aged 66); Bern, Switzerland
- Occupations: Homemaker; teacher
- Spouse: Jeremias Gotthelf
- Children: Henriette Rüetschi-Bitzius; Albert Bitzius

Henriette Bitzius-Zeender (1805-1872) was a Swiss homemaker, wife of the pastor and writer Jeremias Gotthelf, whose works she proofread and transcribed. She was born on 8 August 1805 in Bern and died on 14 June 1872 in the same city.

== Biography ==
=== Early life ===
Henriette Bitzius-Zeender was born on 8 August 1805 in Bern, under the name Heinrica Elisabetha Zeender. She was the youngest of three children of Emanuel Jakob Zeender, a theology professor at the Academy of Bern, and Marianne Zeender-Fasnacht.

After losing her parents at the age of two, she was raised with her brother Samuel Albrecht and her sister Maria Anna Katharina by her maternal grandparents, Jakob Albrecht Fasnacht and Katharina Fasnacht née Lüthi, in the parsonage of Lützelflüh. Her grandfather, appointed pastor in that commune in 1808, and her grandmother, from a farming family, looked after them. She spent her childhood and youth in the Emmental and made frequent stays in Jegenstorf, where her uncle Johann Ludwig Fasnacht became a pastor in 1812.

At school age, their brother took them to the orphanage in Bern, in accordance with the customs of the time. Later, the two girls were placed under the care of Miss Feuerstein in Burgdorf.

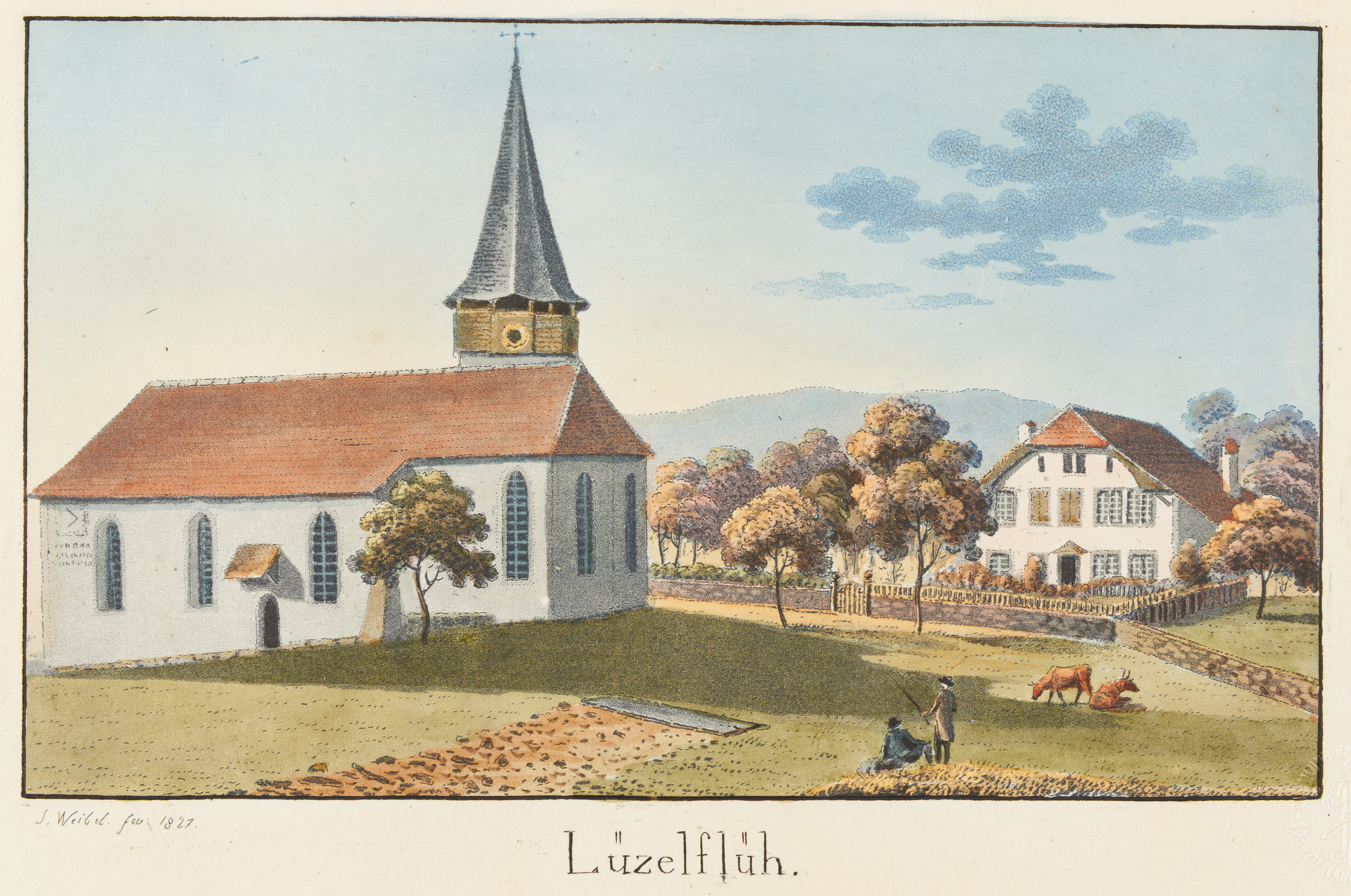
Church and parsonage of Lützelflüh, where Henriette Bitzius-Zeender lived as a child and later as a pastor's wife (1827).

=== Education ===
Henriette Zeender received education at a private institute in Burgdorf following the principles of Johann Heinrich Pestalozzi.

In 1821, she was sent to the Guyot boarding school in Saint-Blaise, in the Canton of Neuchâtel, where she stayed for two years to complete her education. She acquired knowledge useful for her role as an educator for the granddaughters of her guardian, Johann Rudolf von Sinner.

=== Career ===
Her guardian helped her find positions as a governess in Aarwangen and Kiesen.

Before breaking off her engagement in 1828/1829, Henriette Zeender taught at Walthard's private school in Bern.

=== Personal life ===
==== Broken engagement and marriage ====
In 1828/1829, Henriette Bitzius-Zeender broke off her engagement with Bernhard Walthard, which had been announced after 1823, when he was a curate in Lützelflüh.

In 1829, she returned to Lützelflüh to join her widowed grandfather and manage the household of the parsonage. It was there that she met Albert Bitzius in 1831, when he took the position of curate. She married him in 1833 in Wynigen. From then on, she was primarily seen as the wife, mother, and assistant to her writer husband, who wrote under the pseudonym Jeremias Gotthelf. She read and transcribed his works, while also moderating some of his political comments.

Julius Springer, Gotthelf's publisher, remarked in a letter that Albert Bitzius would not have become Jeremias Gotthelf without his wife, highlighting the influence she had on him.

==== Family ====
In the years 1834, 1835, and 1837, she gave birth to three children: Marie Henriette, Cécile, and Albert Bitzius II. The latter, who had fragile health and required special care, became a pastor in Twann and later an influential executive councilor and councilor of states. The eldest daughter, Marie Henriette, known as Henriette and under her pen name Marie Walden, was a writer like her father. The second daughter, Cécile, married the pastor Albert von Rütte.

Within the family, she moderated the influence of her mother-in-law and sister-in-law while raising her daughters. She also hosted her husband's numerous guests.

==== Widowhood ====
Upon her husband's death in 1854, Henriette Bitzius-Zeender departed from Lützelflüh, where she had spent most of her life. In 1855, she settled in Bern, moved to Sumiswald in 1860, where her eldest daughter was the wife of Pastor Rüetschi, and then established herself in 1867 in an estate in Wankdorf, near Bern.

=== Later life ===
During her last 18 years, Henriette Bitzius-Zeender led a life consistent with society's expectations of a pastor's widow. She cared for her children and grandchildren, particularly after the death of her son-in-law Ludwig Rüetschi in 1866, and played a central role in maintaining ties among family members scattered across various regions, including Bern, Gstaad, and Twann.

To ensure the sale of her late husband's works, she continued to maintain contact with the Berlin publisher Julius Springer. She died of pneumonia on 14 June 1872 in Bern.

According to her wishes, the inheritance passed under the care of her youngest daughter, Cécile von Rütte-Bitzius, the last representative of the first generation after Gotthelf.

== Bibliography ==
- Walden, Marie (1941). Frau Henriette Bitzius-Zeender. Ein Lebensbild, von ihrer Tochter erzählt [Henriette Bitzius-Zeender: A Life Portrait, Told by Her Daughter] (in German).
- Fehr, Karl (1954). Jeremias Gotthelf (in German).
- Stump, Doris (1997). Wäber, J. Harald (ed.). "Wider die Hoffart und den Hochmut der Frauen. Das Frauenbild bei Jeremias Gotthelf" [Against the Pride and Arrogance of Women: The Image of Women in Jeremias Gotthelf]. Holl (in German): 149–170, 167–170.
- Lüthardt, Gertrud (1948). Die Pfarrfrau von Lützelfüh, Henriette Bitzius, geh. Zeender [The Pastor's Wife of Lützelflüh, Henriette Bitzius, née Zeender] (PDF) (in German). pp. 85–94.
