= Through the Forests and Through the Trees =

1956 film

- Film poster
- Directed by: G. W. Pabst
- Written by: Hans Watzlik; Walter Forster
- Produced by: Herbert O. Horn
- Starring: Eva Bartok; Peter Arens; Joe Stöckel
- Cinematography: Kurt Grigoleit
- Edited by: Herbert Taschner
- Music by: Erwin Halletz; Herbert Windt
- Production company: Unicorn Film
- Distributed by: Neue Filmverleih
- Release date: 19 October 1956
- Running time: 98 minutes
- Country: West Germany
- Language: German

Through the Forests and Through the Trees (German: Durch die Wälder, durch die Auen) is a 1956 West German historical comedy film directed by G. W. Pabst and starring Eva Bartok, Peter Arens, and Joe Stöckel. It was Pabst's final film. The film's sets were designed by the art director Ludwig Reiber. It was shot at the Bavaria Studios in Munich and on location in Venice and Zwiesel. It was made in Eastmancolor.

== Cast ==
- Eva Bartok as Caroline Brand
- Peter Arens as Carl Maria von Weber
- Joe Stöckel as Kutscher Treml
- Rudolf Vogel as Valerian
- Karl Schönböck as Graf Enzio von Schwarzenbrunn
- Michael Cramer as Konrad
- Carolin Reiber as Marie
- Maria Stadler as Anna
- Heinz Kargus as Züngenhorn
- Rolf Weih as Seifensieder
- Erik Frey as Graf Geza Esterhazy
- Fritz Lafontaine as Mesner
- Johannes Buzalski as Schnapsnase

== Bibliography ==
- Bock, Hans-Michael; Bergfelder, Tim, eds. (2009). The Concise Cinegraph: Encyclopaedia of German Cinema. New York: Berghahn Books. ISBN 978-1-57181-655-9.
