= Peter Arens =

Swiss actor

- Born: 18 February 1928; Freiburg, Germany
- Died: 25 August 2015 (aged 87); Zürich, Switzerland
- Occupation: Actor
- Years active: 1954–2009 (film)

Peter Arens (18 February 1928 – 25 August 2015) was a German-born Swiss film and television actor.

== Selected filmography ==
- The Mountains Between Us (1956)
- The Last Summer (1954)
- Silence in the Forest (1955)
- Uli the Tenant (1955)
- Regine (1956)
- Through the Forests and Through the Trees (1956)
- Queen Louise (1957)
- The Magnificent Rebel (1962)
- Morning's at Seven (1968)
- Assassination in Davos (1975)
- Der Spinnenmörder (1978, TV film)
- Villa Amalia (2009)
