= The Cheese Factory in the Hamlet =

1958 film

- Directed by: Franz Schnyder
- Written by: Jeremias Gotthelf (novel); Richard Schweizer; Franz Schnyder
- Produced by: Franz Schnyder
- Starring: Annemarie Düringer; Franz Matter; Heinrich Gretler; Hedda Koppé
- Cinematography: Konstantin Irmen-Tschet
- Edited by: René Martinet
- Music by: Robert Blum
- Production company: Neue Film
- Distributed by: Beretta-Film
- Release date: 26 December 1958
- Running time: 106 minutes
- Country: Switzerland
- Language: German

The Cheese Factory in the Hamlet (German: Die Käserei in der Vehfreude) is a 1958 Swiss historical comedy film directed by Franz Schnyder and starring Annemarie Düringer, Franz Matter and Heinrich Gretler. It is an adaptation of the 1850 novel of the same title by Jeremias Gotthelf. With its rural nineteenth century setting, it is part of the group of popular heimatfilm made after the Second World War.

== Partial cast ==
- Annemarie Düringer as Änneli
- Franz Matter as Felix
- Heinrich Gretler as Ammann
- Hedda Koppé as Ammännin
- Margrit Winter as Bethi
- Erwin Kohlund as Sepp
- Ruedi Walter as Peterli
- Margrit Rainer as Eisi
- Max Haufler as Eglihannes
- Emil Hegetschweiler as Pfarrer
- Willy Fueter as Käsefürst
- Christian Kohlund as Schüler

== Bibliography ==
- Luhr, William. World cinema since 1945. Ungar, 1987.
