= Alfred Schlageter =

Swiss actor

Alfred Schlageter (August 26, 1896 – September 21, 1981) was a Swiss actor.

== Selected filmography ==
- The Divine Jetta (1937)
- After the Storm (1948)
- The Mountains Between Us (1956)
- The Crimson Circle (1960)
- William Tell (1960)
- The Strangler of the Tower (1966)
- Assassination in Davos (1975)
