= Max Knapp =

Swiss actor

Max Knapp (13 November 1899 - 16 December 1979) was a Swiss film and television actor.

== Selected filmography ==
- Der Kegelkönig (1942)
- Gilberte de Courgenay (1942)
- Polizischt Wäckerli (1956)
- Sacred Waters (1960)
- William Tell (1961)
- Assassination in Davos (1975)
