= Mishap Creek =

River in Alaska, United States

Coordinates: 54°25′37″N 164°50′53″W

Mishap Creek is a stream in Aleutians East Borough, Alaska, in the United States.

Mishap Creek was named from an incident when a lightkeeper threw his dry clothes across the creek while crossing it, missed the bank, and lost his clothing to the current.

== See also ==
- List of rivers of Alaska
