= Erwin Kohlund =

German actor (1915-1992)

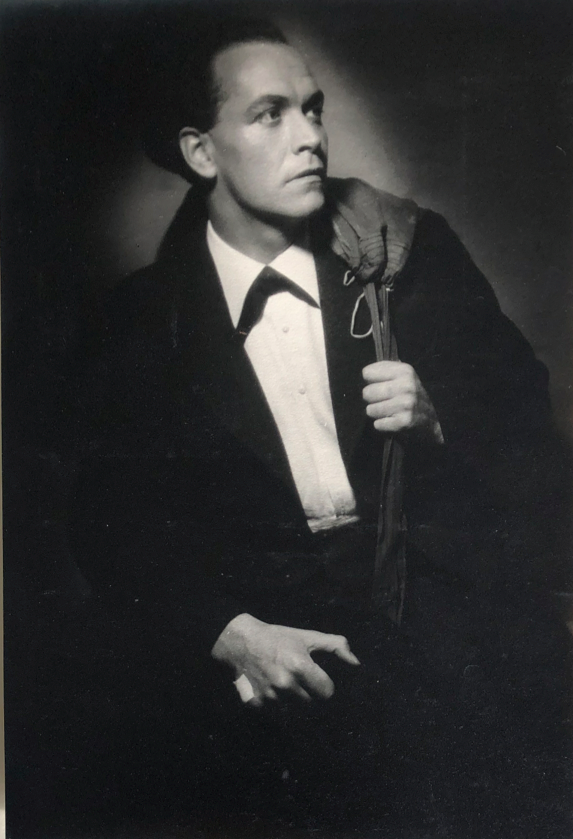
Erwin Kohlund in 1948

Erwin Kohlund (1915–1992) was a German and Swiss actor.

== Filmography ==
Year	Title	Role	Notes
1939	Tschiffa	Hans Jakob Marti - Bergführer	
1941	Gilberte de Courgenay	Peter Hasler	
1941	A Village Romeo and Juliet	Sali Manz	
1954	Der Prozess der Zwanzigtausend	Verteidiger der Auslandschweizer	
1954	Uli the Farmhand	Johannes - Joggelis Sohn	
1955	Uli the Tenant	Johannes - Joggelis Sohn	
1956	The Mountains Between Us	Arzt	
1957	Bäckerei Zürrer	Architekt Moser	
1958	The Cheese Factory in the Hamlet	Sepp, Mann der Bethi	
1959	SOS Gletscherpilot	Kalbermatten	
1959	Café Odeon	Dr. Albin Kartmann - Gymnasialprofessor	
1960	Anne Bäbi Jowäger - I. Teil: Wie Jakobli zu einer Frau kommt	Pfarrer	
1962	Anne Bäbi Jowäger - II. Teil: Jakobli und Meyeli	Pfarrer	
1964	Geld und Geist	Christen	
1970	Dällebach Kari	Herr Geiser	
1974	Die Auslieferung	Conseiller fédéral	
1976	Riedland	Lorenz	
1977	Death of a President	Prof. Isseling	
1977	Die Konsequenz	Gefägnisdirektor Reichmuth	
1978	Anne Bäbi Jowäger	Pfarrer	
1980	Das gefrorene Herz	Priest	
1980	The Inventor	Fabrikant (Facrory-owner)	
1985	Girl in a Boot	Botschafter Rüthi	
1990	Mirakel	Generalvikar	
