= Hanns In der Gand =

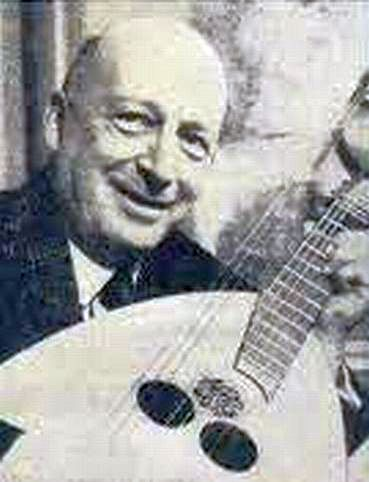
Hanns In der Gand

Hanns In der Gand was the pen name of Ladislaus Krupski (25 February 1882 – 24 May 1947) was a Swiss folklorist and collector of traditional and military songs.

== Biography ==
He was born on 25 February 1882 in La Vernaz, France (formerly Savoy). Born to a Polish father and a German mother, he held citizenship of Schleinikon in the canton of Zurich. He was educated in Lucerne, he studied in Neuchâtel and was educated as a singer in Frankfurt and Munich. He worked as an actor at the court of Altenburg, but returned to Switzerland in the First World War.

He was active collecting traditional folk songs and instrumental music in all parts of Switzerland in the interbellum period. His pseudonym suggests a native of the canton of Uri, the surname being taken from the name of a character in a novel by Ernst Zahn, Albin Indergand. He used this name in order to more easily gain the confidence of his rural informants from whom he collected the songs. He used to perform the songs he collected, accompanying himself on the lute. During both world wars he was employed as a singer in the Swiss Army.

He died on 24 May 1947 in Zumikon.

== Works ==
- "Schwyzerfähnli" 1915–1917
- "La petite Gilberte de Courgenay" 1917
- "Vieilles chansons populaires et militaires de la Suisse Romande et Italienne" 1917
- "Alti Schwyzerlieder" 1921
- "Scelta di canzoni popolari ticinesi" 1933
