= The Mishap =

- Directed by: Alberto Lattuada
- Produced by: Carlo Ponti
- Starring: Anouk Aimée
- Cinematography: Roberto Gerardi; Ennio Guarnieri
- Edited by: Leo Catozzo
- Music by: Piero Piccioni
- Distributed by: La CEIAD Columbia
- Release date: 1961
- Country: Italy
- Language: Italian

L'imprevisto, internationally released as The Mishap, is a 1961 Italian crime-drama film directed by Alberto Lattuada. It was coproduced by France, where it was released with the title L'Imprévu.

For this film, Lattuada won the 1961 prize for Best Director at the San Sebastián International Film Festival.

== Cast ==
- Anouk Aimée : Claire Plemian
- Tomas Milian : Thomas Plemian
- Raymond Pellegrin : Sérizeilles
- Jeanne Valérie : Juliette
- Jacques Morel : l'inspecteur de police
- Yvette Beaumont : Suzanne
