= Jeremias Gotthelf =

Swiss novelist (1797–1854)

Albert Bitzius
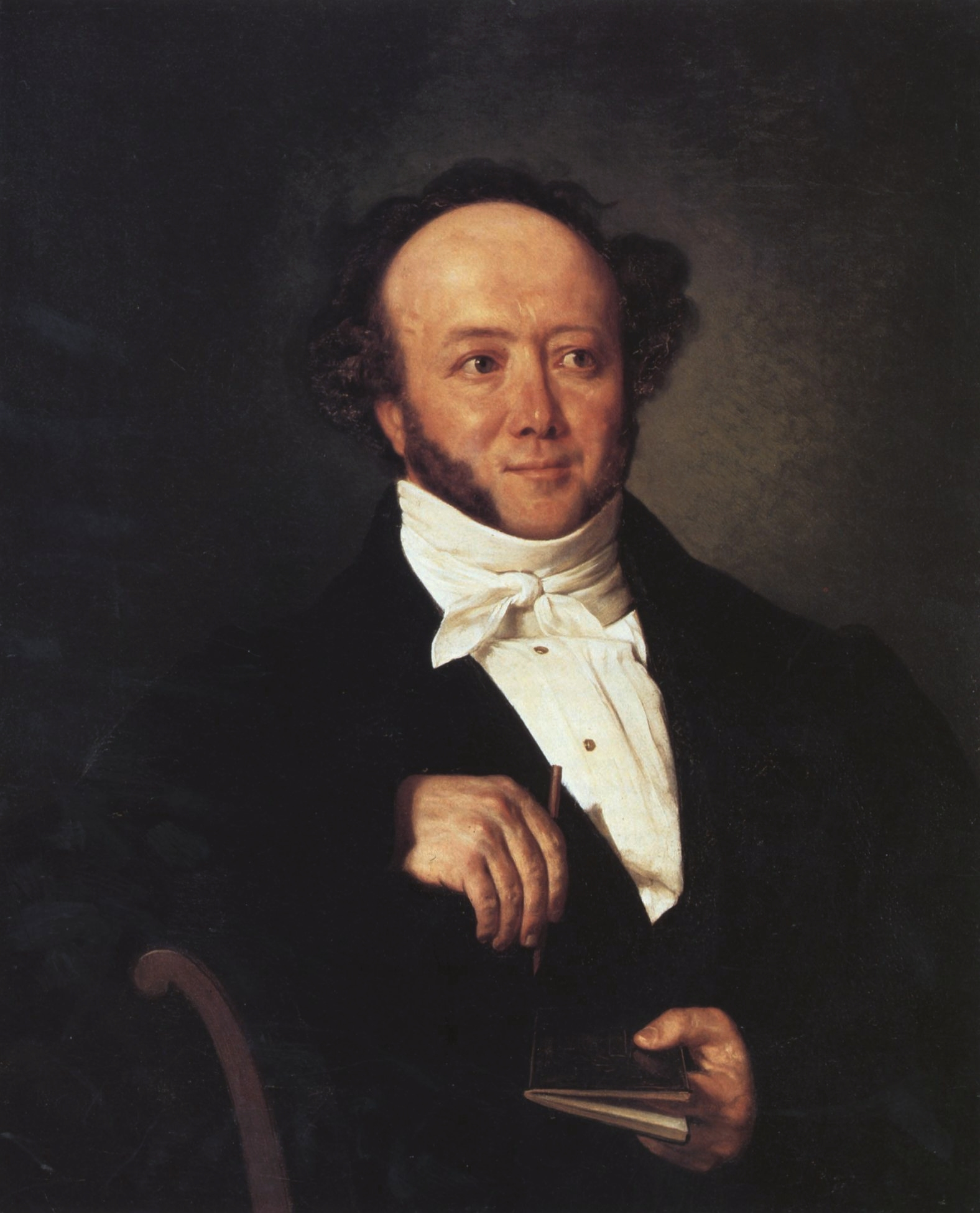
- Portrait by Johann Friedrich Dietler
- Born: Albert Bitzius; 4 October 1797; Murten, Switzerland
- Died: 22 October 1854 (aged 57); Lützelflüh, Switzerland
- Occupations: Pastor, writer
- Children: 1 son, 2 daughters
- Writing career
- Pen name: Jeremias Gotthelf
- Language: (Swiss Standard) German
- Notable work: The Black Spider

Albert Bitzius (4 October 1797 – 22 October 1854) was a Swiss novelist, best known by his pen name of Jeremias Gotthelf.

== Biography ==
Bitzius was born at Murten, where his father was pastor. The Bitzius family had once belonged to the Bernese patriciate, but was known for its craftsmen and pastors since the 17th century. In 1804, the family home was moved to Utzenstorf, a village in the Bernese Emmental. Here young Bitzius grew up, receiving his early education and consorting with the boys of the village, as well as helping his father to cultivate his glebe. In 1812 he went to complete his education at Bern. He was a founding member of the Student Society Zofingia, the second-oldest fraternity in Switzerland (founded in 1819).

In 1820 he was received as a pastor. In 1821 he enrolled for a year at the University of Göttingen, but returned home in 1822 to act as his father's assistant. On his father's death (1824) he went in the same capacity to Herzogenbuchsee, and later to Bern (1829). Early in 1831 he went as assistant to the aged pastor of the village of Lützelflüh, in the Lower Emmental (between Langnau and Burgdorf), being soon elected his successor (1832) and marrying one of his granddaughters, Henriette Zeender (1833).

He spent the rest of his life in Lützelflüh, where he died, leaving three children (the son was a pastor, the two daughters married pastors). During the 1840s, he steadfastly opposed radicalism and secularism and placed a conservative emphasis on piety and ecclesiastical authority. There are lives of Bitzius by C. Manuel, in the Berlin edition of Bitzius's works (Berlin, 1861), and by J. Ammann in vol. i. (Bern, 1884) of the Sammlung Bernischer Biographien.

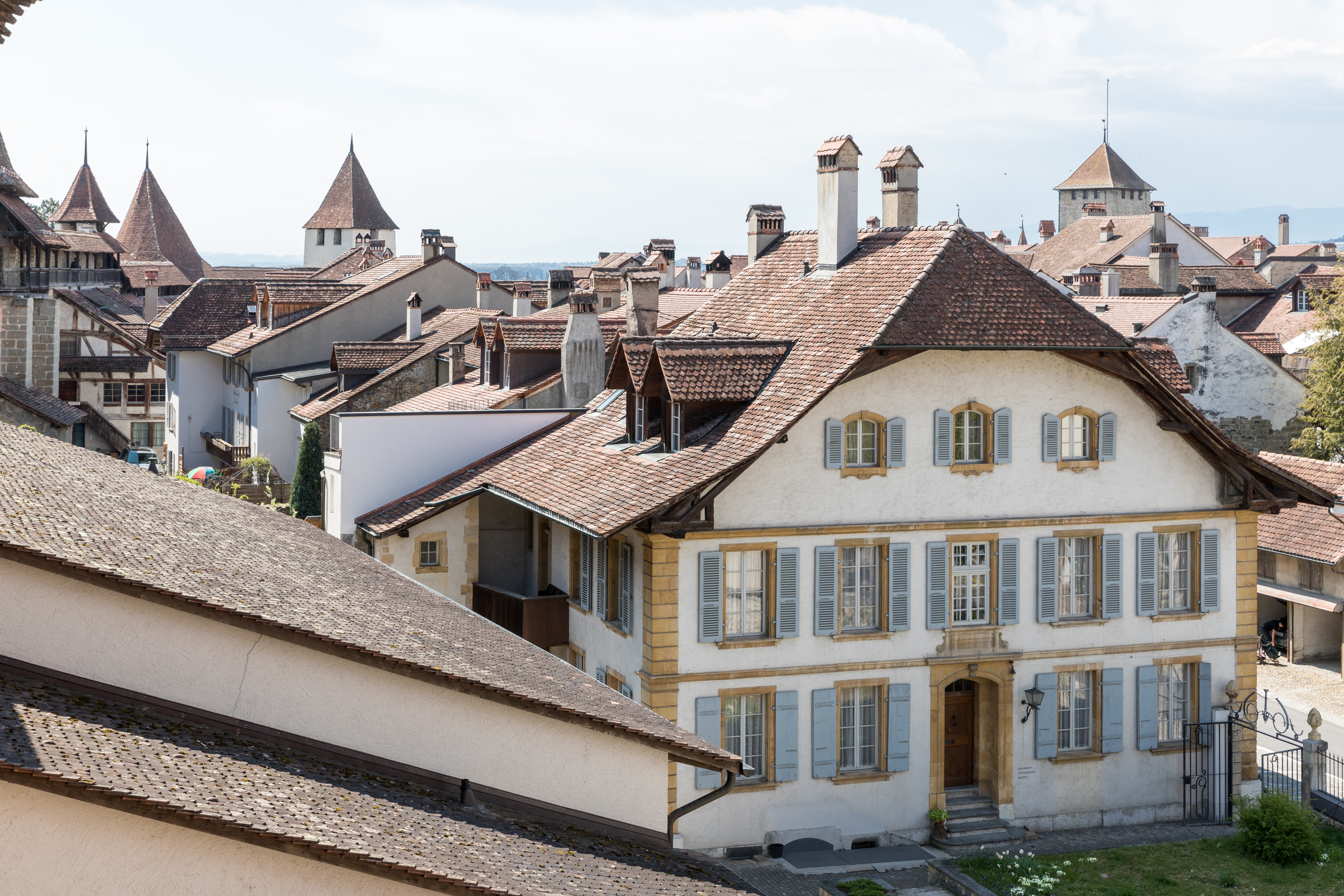
Birthplace in Murten (Deutsches Pfarrhaus)

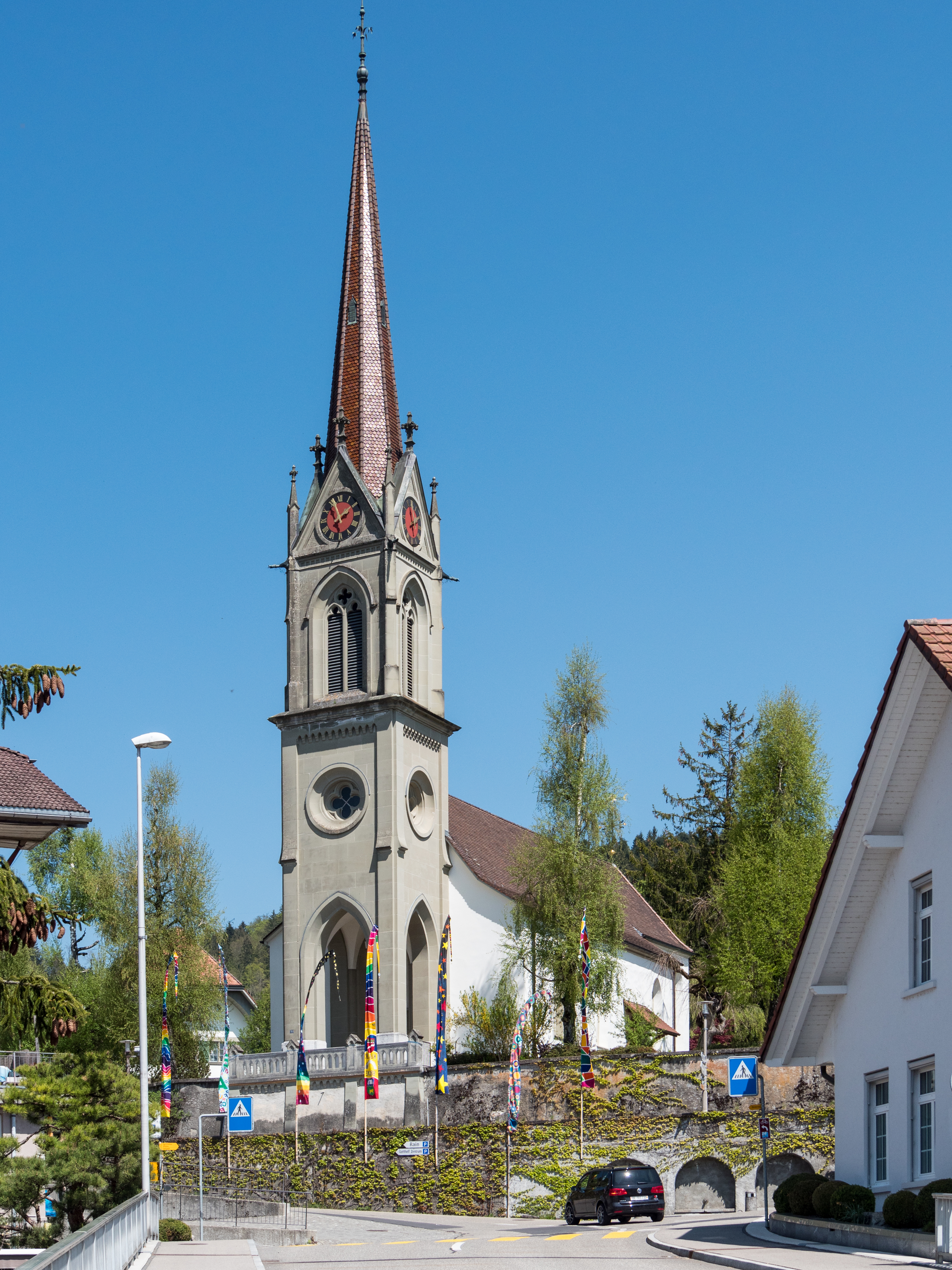
Church in Lützelflüh

== Writings ==
Bitzius started writing fiction in his late thirties. His first work, the Der Bauernspiegel, oder die Lebensgeschichte des Jeremias Gotthelf, appeared in 1837. It purported to be the life of Jeremias Gotthelf, narrated by himself, and this name was later adopted by the author as his pen name. It sketches the development of a poor country orphan boy, but is not an autobiography. It is a living picture of Bernese (or, strictly speaking, Emmental) village life, true to nature, and not attempting to gloss over its defects and failings. It is written (like the rest of his works) in German, but contains expressions from the Bernese dialect of the Emmental, though Bitzius was not (like Auerbach) a peasant by birth, but belonged to the educated classes, so that he reproduces what he had seen and learnt, and not what he had himself personally experienced. The book was a great success, as it was a picture of real life, and not of fancifully beribboned eighteenth-century villagers. Henceforth Bitzius was a prolific writer, and in the last 18 years of his life became one of the important novelists not only of Switzerland but of the German language in general.

His best-known work is without doubt the short novel from 1842, The Black Spider (Die schwarze Spinne), a semi-allegorical tale of the plague in form of the titular monster that devastates a Swiss valley community; first as a result of a pact with the devil born out of need and a second time due to the moral decay that releases the monster from its prison again.

Among his later tales are the Leiden und Freuden eines Schulmeisters (1838–1839), Uli der Knecht (The story of a poor peasant laborer who develops into the owner of a prosperous farm; 1841), with its continuation, Uli der Pächter (1849), Anne-Bäbi Jowäger (1843–1844), Käthi, die Großmutter (1846), Die Käserei in der Vehfreude (1850), and the Erlebnisse eines Schuldenbauers (1853). He also published several volumes of shorter tales.

His works were issued in 24 volumes at Berlin, between 1856 and 1861, while 10 volumes, giving the original text of each story, were issued at Bern between 1898 and 1900.

== Cultural references ==
=== Literature ===
- In The Tongue Set Free, the first part of the autobiography of Elias Canetti, the author mentions being haunted by Gotthelf's short story 'The Black Spider' in his early teens.
- In the novel 2666 by Roberto Bolaño Gotthelf is mentioned as the subject of the novel Bitzius:

(...) and in Bitzius, a novel less than one hundred pages long, similar in some ways to Mitzi's Treasure, (...) and that told the story of the life of Albert Bitzius, pastor of Lützelflüh, in the canton of Bern, an author of sermons as well as a writer under the pseudonym Jeremias Gotthelf.

- In Robert Walser's 1922 novel The Robber, Gotthelf is mentioned several times. One character is described as "precisely the sort of well-bred chatterbox depicted for us by none other than Gotthelf in Uli the Farmhand," and another character is said to be clinging to Gotthelf as a guardian saint, plus further discussion of Uli the Farmhand.

=== Film adaptations ===
- Uli the Farmhand (1954)
- Uli the Tenant (1955)
- The Cheese Factory in the Hamlet (1958)
- Anne Bäbi Jowäger – I. Teil: Wie Jakobli zu einer Frau kommt (1960)
- Anne Bäbi Jowäger – II. Teil: Jakobli und Meyeli (1962)
- Geld und Geist (1964)

All six films were directed by the Swiss film director Franz Schnyder.
