= Old School Kids Beats =

Debut album by Jenni Pulos

Studio album by Jenni Pulos
- Released: March 15, 2013
- Recorded: 2012 in Chicago
- Genre: Children's; hip hop
- Length: 46:01
- Label: Jenni Pulos
- Producer: P-Lee Fresh; Ron Steele Jr.

Old School Kids Beats is the debut album by children's singer Jenni Pulos released on March 15, 2013. The record was independently issued by Pulos, who worked with the online music store CD Baby for the release. A children's music and hip hop album, its sound was influenced by the music Pulos grew up listening to.

The album features guest appearances from numerous musicians, such as Annelise Steele, P-Lee, Jaz-Flo, and her husband Jonathan Nassos. Old School Kids Beats contains sixteen original songs while the digital edition includes an additional track – an alternate version of "Bullies Aren't Cool". A music video for the track "Poo in the Potty" was released in August 2015.

== Development ==
Jenni Pulos expressed interest in creating a children's music album after revealing her pregnancy in 2012. In an interview in Chicago Splash, she stated that'' she wanted to do a children's album even before she had her daughter Allinah" . The record serves as a "throwback" to the rap music from her generation, but with the addition of "great messages for kids" within the lyrics. The singer also backed her decision by calling herself "the poster child" for not letting people discourage her dreams. For the record, Pulos wrote each of the albums of 13 songs and worked with producers DJ Parker Lee (under the alias P-Lee Fresh) and Ron Steele Jr: the recording sessions took place solely throughout Chicago in 2012.

== Promotion ==
A music video for "Poo in the Potty" was filmed and released in 2015, nearly two years after the album's release. It was broadcast live on television during the season eighth finale of Flipping Out on August 19, 2015.

== Critical reception ==
Old School Kids Beats was well received by music critics. A staff member form Celebrity Parents Magazine applauded Pulos' debut and stated: "It’s a fun album for kids and will have parents waxing nostalgic about old school hip hop–while their kid is pooing on the potty."

== Track listing ==
Old School Kids Beats – Standard edition
No.	Title	Length
1.	"The Birthday Dance"	2:24
2.	"ABC Jam" (featuring Annelise Steele)	3:19
3.	"Poo in the Potty" (featuring P-Lee)	1:57
4.	"H.I.C.C.U.P."	2:49
5.	"Take Your Vitamins"	1:22
6.	"Brush Your Teeth"	3:22
7.	"Doggies & Kitties" (featuring Jaz-Flo)	3:29
8.	"Don't Be a Clown"	1:11
9.	"No Fighting, No Biting"	3:34
10.	"The Doctor Says" (featuring Dr. Jonathan Nassos)	3:19
11.	"We Thank You" (featuring Annelise Steele)	2:48
12.	"Cell Phone 411"	3:36
13.	"Bullies Aren't Cool"	2:57
14.	"ABC Jam (East Coast Version)" (featuring Annelise Steele)	3:45
15.	"H.I.C.C.U.P. (West Coast Version)"	2:32
16.	"Cell Phone 411 (East Coast Version)"	3:34
Total length:		46:01

Old School Kids Beats – Digital edition (bonus track)
No.	Title	Length
17.	"Bullies Aren't Cool (Techno Version)"	3:27
Total length:		49:28
