= Der 10. Mai =

1957 film

- Directed by: Franz Schnyder
- Written by: Franz Schnyder; Arnold Kübler; William Michael Treichlinger
- Produced by: Franz Schnyder
- Starring: Hans Gaugler
- Cinematography: Konstantin Irmen-Tschet
- Edited by: Hans Heinrich Egger
- Release date: 18 October 1957
- Running time: 91 minutes
- Country: Switzerland
- Language: German

Der 10. Mai is a 1957 Swiss drama film directed by Franz Schnyder. It was entered into the 8th Berlin International Film Festival.

== Cast ==
- Hans Gaugler as Fritz Steiner
- Linda Geiser as Anna Marti
- Therese Giehse as Ida Herz
- Yvette Perrin as Jeannette Perrin
- Heinz Reincke as Werner Kramer
- Fred Tanner as Albert Widmer
- Hermann Wlach as Julius Herz

== Plot ==
World War II, 10 May 1940: The forces of the German Wehrmacht start the Battle of France and invade the Netherlands, Belgium and Luxembourg.

While inspecting tracks close to the border early in the morning, Swiss railway official Emil Tschumi stumbles across German refugee Werner Kramer. Kramer has swum across the Rhine and made it to Switzerland. Tschumi, a good-natured old man, takes Kramer to his tiny service shed so he can dry his wet clothes. The young German tells him that he is wanted by the Gestapo because he had spoken with a colleague about foreign radio stations. Tschumi has sympathy for Kramer but advises him to move on because he would surely be sent back to Germany if he were to be detained by border officials.

On 10 May 1940 German troops march along the border of Switzerland. The Swiss Federal Council is afraid of a sneak attack and orders mobilization. Now the Swiss border is sharply guarded. At a railway station, Werner Kramer witnesses an old German refugee being hauled off by Swiss border police because he attracted attention for having neither proper documents nor local currency to buy a train ticket. With the aid of a truck driver Kramer leaves the border area but later gets abandoned in the middle of nowhere. Somehow he makes it to Zurich, where his childhood friend Anna Marti works at a fashion store.

Anna advises him to seek help from the influential Hefti family who he used to be acquainted with. However, like many other wealthy people, the family have already sought refuge in the Swiss heartland, believing that the Alpine region is a safer place to be in case of a German invasion. Anna allows him to stay in an attic apartment. Kramer lives in constant fear of being discovered and reported to the authorities who would then inevitably send him back to Germany. Anna's brother-in-law, Albert Widmer is not sympathetic to Kramer's situation and makes no secret of his dislike for him. The pressure becomes too much for Kramer and he turns himself in. By a lucky twist of fate, he comes across an old-school police officer who is sympathetic to his plight.
