= Uli the Farmhand =

- Hannes Schmidhauser and Liselotte Pulver
- Directed by: Franz Schnyder
- Written by: Richard Schweizer; Werner Düggelin; Franz Schnyder; Jeremias Gotthelf (novel)
- Produced by: Oscar Düby; Max Dora
- Starring: Hannes Schmidhauser; Liselotte Pulver; Heinrich Gretler
- Cinematography: Emil Berna
- Edited by: Hermann Haller; Hans Heinrich Egger
- Music by: Robert Blum
- Production company: Gloriafilm AG
- Release date: 19 October 1954
- Running time: 115 minutes
- Country: Switzerland
- Language: Swiss German

Uli the Farmhand (German: Uli der Knecht) is a 1954 Swiss film directed by Franz Schnyder and starring Hannes Schmidhauser, Liselotte Pulver and Heinrich Gretler. Based on Jeremias Gotthelf’s 1841 story Wie Uli der Knecht glücklich wird, it follows a farmhand who reforms his life, rises to a position of responsibility on a struggling farm, and must decide whom to marry. The film premiered in Zurich on 19 October 1954 and was a box-office success.

== Synopsis ==
Uli is a farmhand known for drinking and womanising. After being urged to change his ways, he reforms and soon earns a better name. He is then hired by the farmer Joggeli as head farmhand on a neglected farm, where he works to restore order despite resistance. He must also decide whom he should marry, and in the end Joggeli and his wife hand over the farm on lease to the couple.

== Cast ==
The cast includes:

- Hannes Schmidhauser as Uli
- Liselotte Pulver as Vreneli
- Heinrich Gretler as Johannes, the farmer
- Gertrud Jauch as the farmer’s wife
- Emil Hegetschweiler as Joggeli
- Hedda Koppé as Joggeli’s wife
- Marianne Matti as Elisi
- Erwin Kohlund as Johannes
- Stephanie Glaser as Tinette
- Alfred Rasser as the cotton merchant
- Elisabeth Schnell as Annelise
- Linda Geiser as Uersi
- Max Haufler as Karrer

== Production ==
The film is based on Jeremias Gotthelf’s 1841 story Wie Uli der Knecht glücklich wird. It was produced by Gloriafilm AG in Zurich, and its producers were Oscar Düby and Max Dora. Filming took place from 12 April to 19 June 1954. Interior scenes were shot at Filmstudio Rosenhof in Zurich. Exterior scenes were filmed in the Emmental at Brechershäusern ob Wynigen, Eggiwil, Heimischmatt and Würzbrunnen, and in Bern at Junkerngasse.

== Release and reception ==
The film premiered on 19 October 1954 at the Scala cinema in Zurich. It was a box-office success and became a breakthrough film for Hannes Schmidhauser and Liselotte Pulver. Franz Schnyder’s Gotthelf films were commercially very successful, though some critics and younger filmmakers regarded them as unpolitical and reactionary. It was among Franz Schnyder’s works that were digitally restored by Swiss Radio and Television (SRF) in collaboration with the Cinémathèque suisse and the Memoriav foundation.

== Festival screenings ==
The film was screened at the 65th Locarno Film Festival in 2012.
