= Franz Schnyder =

Swiss film director (1910–1993)

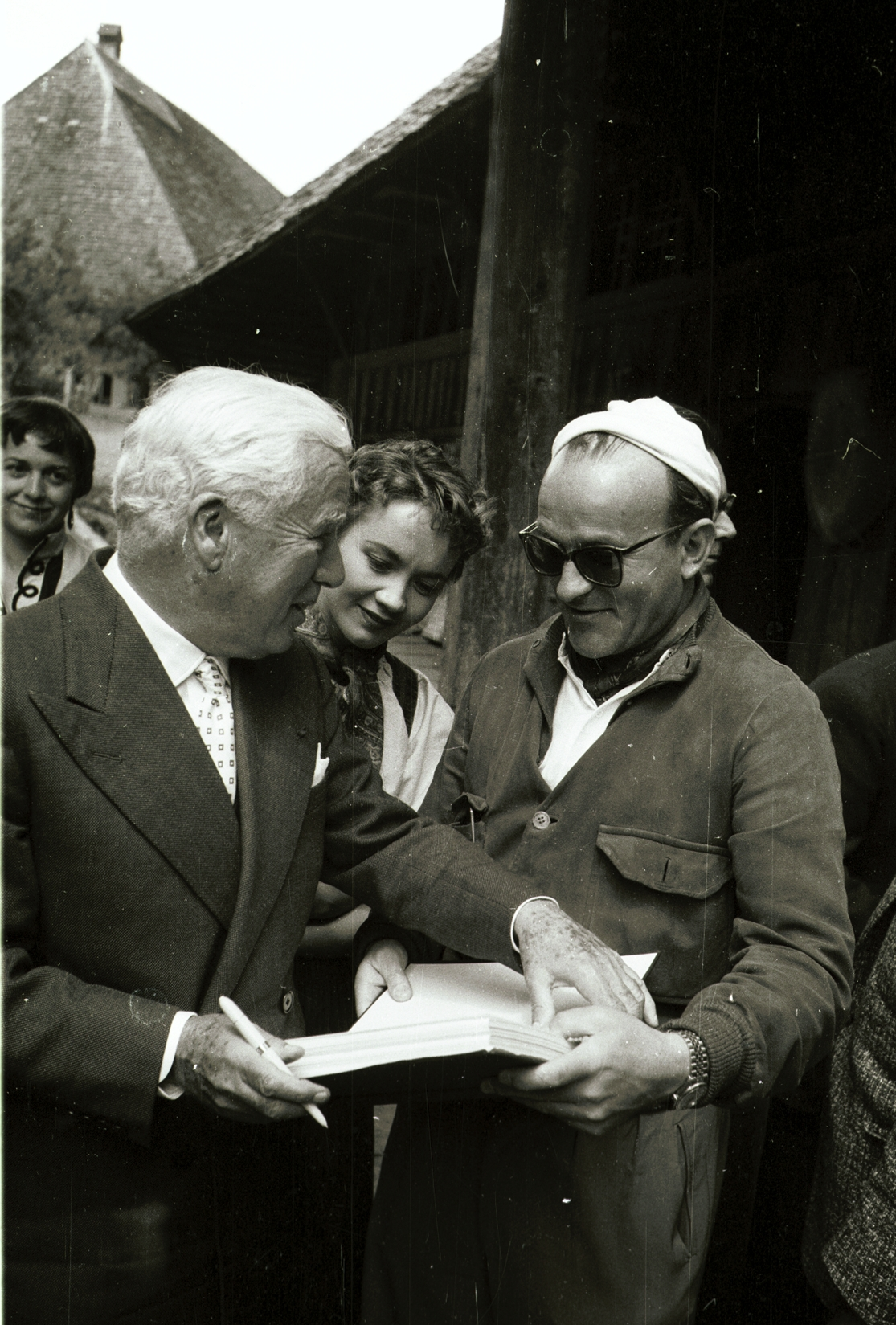
- Schnyder (right) with Charlie Chaplin and Liselotte Pulver on the set of Uli the Tenant, 1955
- Born: 5 March 1910; Burgdorf, Switzerland
- Died: 8 February 1993 (aged 82); Münsingen, Switzerland
- Known for: Film directing, theatre directing, acting, film production

Franz Schnyder (5 March 1910 – 8 February 1993) was a Swiss film and theatre director, whilst also being an actor and film producer. After beginning his career in German and Swiss theatre, he moved into film, directing with Gilberte de Courgenay, which became a major success. Schnyder later became known for his adaptations of works by Jeremias Gotthelf, including Uli der Knecht and Uli the Tenant. He also directed Heidi und Peter, which was the first Swiss color film released in cinemas.

== Life and career ==
Franz Schnyder was born on 5 March 1910 in Burgdorf. He grew up there being the son of engineer Maximilian Schnyder and Fanny Louise Steiner. Schnyder completed his secondary education in Burgdorf. He trained as an actor and director with Ilka Grüning in Berlin and Louise Dumont in Düsseldorf. His first professional theatre engagement came in Mainz in 1932, followed by work at several theatres in Germany and Switzerland. In 1933 Schnyder appeared as an actor in Das kalte Herz, his first work in film.

During his years in Germany, he established himself as an actor and theatre director, with productions distinguished by unusual staging and set design. From 1937 - 1939, he acted and directed at the Deutsches Theater in Berlin, while also working as a guest director at the Munich Kammerspiele. Shortly before the outbreak of the Second World War, Schnyder returned to Switzerland and entered military service. In 1939, he joined the Schauspielhaus Zürich as a director. His theatre work in Switzerland included predominantly political plays.

In 1941, Praesens Film hired Schnyder to direct Gilberte de Courgenay after Swiss immigration authorities intervened to prevent refugee filmmaker Leopold Lindtberg from directing another army-oriented film. It was Schnyder’s first feature film as director. Lindtberg guided him during the production. The film became a popular success, and made Schnyder widely known in Switzerland. After Das Gespensterhaus (1942), he made Wilder Urlaub (1943), which addressed military desertion and proved unpopular with cinema audiences. Schnyder then returned to theatre.

During the decade after Wilder Urlaub, Schnyder worked in theatre and became the first head of the Migros Klubhaus concert series. He returned to filmmaking in 1954 with Uli der Knecht, his first adaptation of a work by Jeremias Gotthelf. He went on to make six Gotthelf adaptations. Uli der Knecht, Heidi und Peter and Geld und Geist together attracted millions of cinema admissions in Switzerland. In 1955, he directed Heidi und Peter, which became the first Swiss colour film released in cinemas. Later that year, Schnyder directed Uli the Tenant, another adaptation of Gotthelf. Charlie Chaplin visited the set during filming. From 1957, Schnyder also worked as a film producer.

In 1957, Schnyder directed Der 10. Mai, which addressed difficult aspects of Switzerland's experience during the Second World War. Produced by Schnyder's Neue Film AG, the film received favourable reviews but performed poorly with audiences. His final cinema film, Die sechs Kummerbuben (1968), was poorly received by critics and audiences. A thirteen-part television version produced alongside it became a ratings success when broadcast in 1969. In later years, he continued writing screenplays. Schnyder spent the final months of his life at the clinic in Münsingen, where he died on 8 February 1993.

== Selected filmography ==
A selection of Schnyder's films as director includes:

- Gilberte de Courgenay (1941)
- Das Gespensterhaus (1942)
- Wilder Urlaub (1943)
- Uli der Knecht (1954)
- Heidi und Peter (1955)
- Uli der Pächter (1955)
- Der 10. Mai (1957)
- Die Käserei in der Vehfreude (1958)
- Anne Bäbi Jowäger (1960–1961)
- Geld und Geist (1964)
- Die sechs Kummerbuben (1968)

== Legacy ==
Schnyder's criticism of federal film funding contributed to tensions with emerging Swiss filmmakers. By the late 1960s, many of them were dismissing his work as “Papas Kino”. In 1984, Christoph Kühn made the documentary FRS: Das Kino der Nation, which examined Schnyder’s career and incorporated scenes from his unrealised Pestalozzi project. The documentary briefly improved Schnyder’s relationship with this new generation of Swiss filmmakers.
