= Common bailiwicks in Switzerland =

Joint administrative districts in the Old Swiss Confederacy

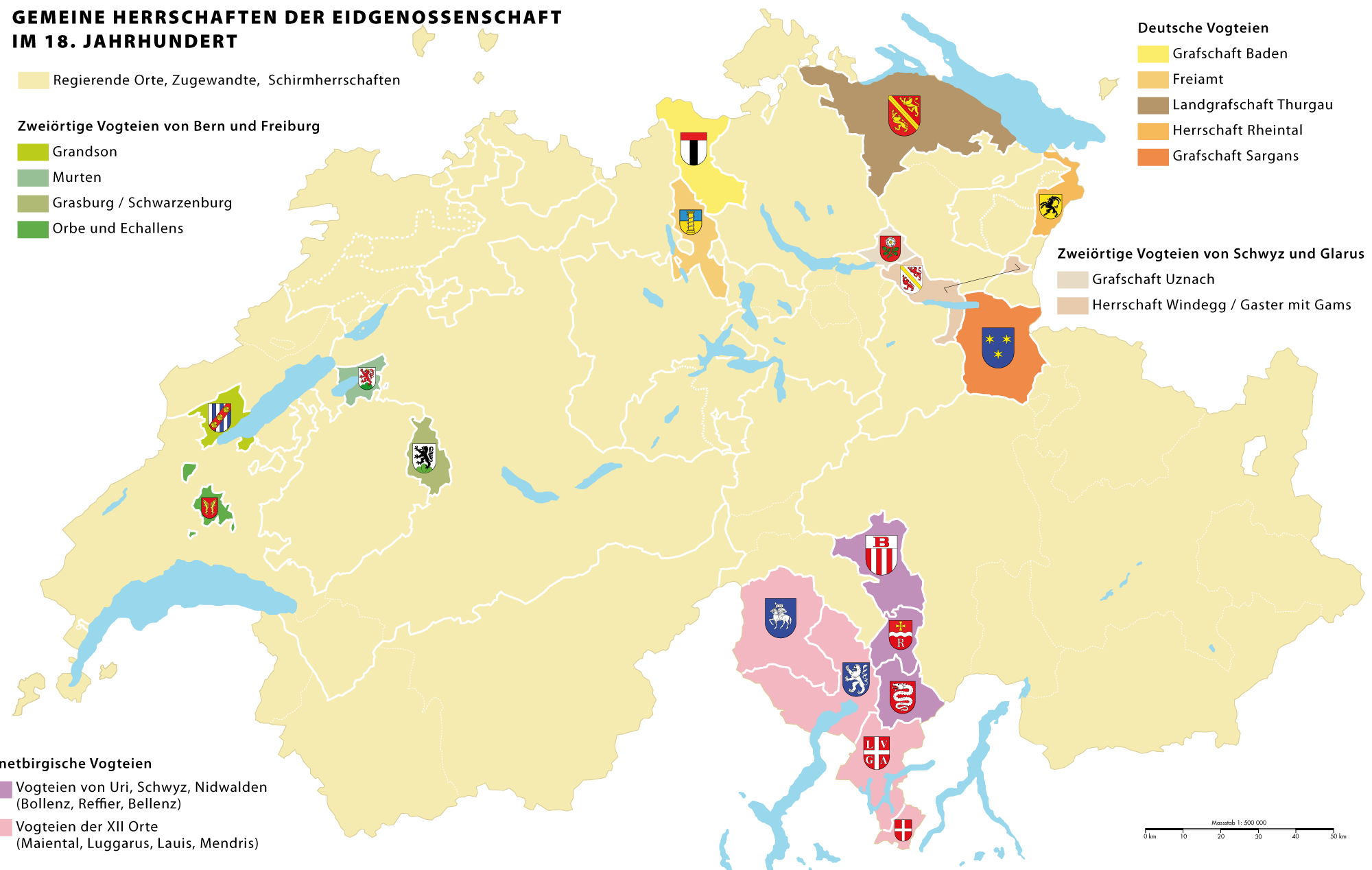
Map of the Old Confederation highlighting the various common bailiwicks in the 18th century.

The common bailiwicks in Switzerland (Gemeine Herrschaften) were, in the Old Swiss Confederacy before 1798, territories jointly administered by several cantons.

== Overview ==
In the Old Swiss Confederacy, the common bailiwicks were "subject territories" (Untertanengebiete; paesi soggetti) belonging to multiple cantons, but never to all of them.
As "subject territories", the common bailiwicks were distinct from full members of the Confederacy, namely:

- Full cantons;
- "Associated states" (Zugewandte Orte; paesi alleati): cities, territories, and ecclesiastical or secular lordships linked to the cantons by perpetual alliances, considered members of the Confederacy but not full cantons.

Within the "subject territories", the common bailiwicks were distinguished from:

- "Protected territories" or "protectorates" (Schirmorte or Schirmherrschaften; protettorati): "subject territories" of one or more cantons or "associated states", with greater autonomy than common bailiwicks but less than "associated states", which often had similar legal ties to the cantons (e.g., combourgeoisie).
- "Subject territories" of a single canton.

In a narrower sense, only "subject territories" of at least three cantons are termed common bailiwicks, while those of two cantons are called "mediate bailiwicks".

Less commonly, and somewhat inaccurately by analogy, the following are also termed common bailiwicks:

- The Upper Five Tenths (the Lötschental): "subject territory" of the Republic of the Seven Tithings (the Upper Valais);
- The three bailiwicks of Valtellina, Bormio, and Chiavenna: "subject territories" of the Three Leagues of the Grisons — the League of God's House, the Grey League, and the League of the Ten Jurisdictions.

Their administration was handled by each of these cantons in turn. This system was established after the conquest of Aargau in 1415, primarily for territories conquered simultaneously by multiple cantons.

== List ==
=== German bailiwicks ===
The "German bailiwicks" (Deutsche Gemeine Vogteien) were bailiwicks located in Aargau or eastern Switzerland resulting from conflicts between the Confederacy and the House of Habsburg. Arising from conquests undertaken in joint military operations by several cantons, they laid the foundation for this type of administration in the Confederacy.

In general, the German bailiwicks were initially governed by the eight members of the Eight Cantons, except Bern. The cantons of Fribourg, Solothurn, Basel, and Schaffhausen, which joined the Confederacy later, were not represented. After the Second Battle of Villmergen, Bern joined the administration of these bailiwicks; Bern, Glarus, and Zürich, being Reformed or parity cantons, then excluded the Catholic cantons from managing the Lower Freie Ämter and the Bailiwick of Baden.

The German bailiwicks were:

- The Freie Ämter (literally "free amts"), conquered in 1415 during the conquest of Aargau. Uri, which did not participate in the conquest, joined their administration only in 1532. After the Second Battle of Villmergen, they were divided into two: the northern part became a bailiwick of the eight cantons, the southern part a bailiwick of Bern, Glarus, and Zürich.
- The County of Baden, which also became a bailiwick of six cantons in 1415 during the conquest of Aargau (Uri joining its administration only in 1443 and Bern in 1712). After the Second Battle of Villmergen, it became the exclusive bailiwick of the Reformed cantons Bern, Glarus, and Zürich.
- The Landgraviate of Thurgau, conquered from the Habsburgs in 1460.
- The Grafschaft Sargans (County of Sargans), sold to the seven cantons in 1483 by the Count of Sargans. Bern joined the seven cantons in 1712.
- The Bailiwick of Rheintal, in 1490; Appenzell was added to the administration in 1500.

=== Italian bailiwicks ===
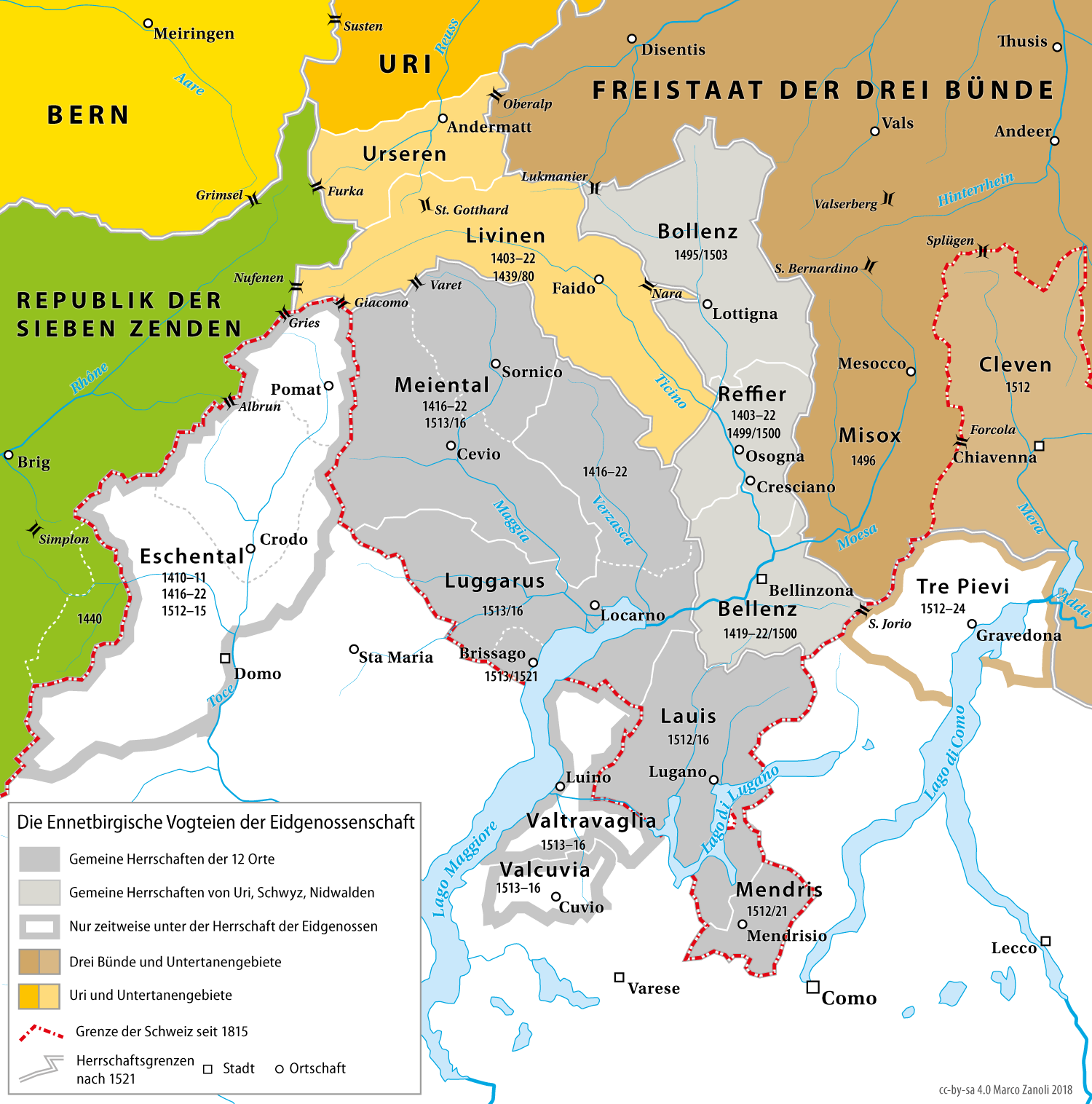
Map centered on the current Ticino region, showing its political division in the Old Confederacy; the common bailiwicks are colored gray, with light gray outlines for those governed by the twelve cantons and dark gray for those directed by Uri, Schwyz, and Nidwalden.

The Italian bailiwicks (also called "ultramontane bailiwicks"; Ennetbergische Vogteien; Baliaggi Ultramontani) were territories located in the current canton of Ticino. Their incorporation into the Confederacy dates from the end of the 15th century and the beginning of the 16th century, at the expense of the Duchy of Milan, during the Italian Wars. Swiss incursions into the region began as early as the beginning of the 15th century, when the cantons of Uri and Obwalden invaded the north of the current canton of Ticino (just south of Uri territory), but these territories were lost in 1422 after the Battle of Arbedo. Uri, however, conquered the Leventina Valley between 1439 and 1441.

The first three bailiwicks were conquered by the cantons of Uri, Schwyz, and Nidwalden at the end of the 15th century; Swiss acquisitions were formalized in 1503 by the Treaty of Arona:

- Bailiwick of Blenio (Vogtei Bollenz; Baliaggio di Blenio), conquered in 1495;
- Bailiwick of the Rivera (Vogtei Reffier; Baliaggio della Riviera), conquered in 1495; the Rivera had previously been conquered by Uri in 1403 but lost in 1422;
- Bailiwick of Bellinzona (Vogtei Bellenz; Baliaggio di Bellinzona), conquered in April 1500; Bellinzona had previously been conquered by Uri in 1419 but lost in 1422.

The other four Italian bailiwicks were conquered in 1512 and administered by the twelve cantons of the time (the thirteen cantons, except Appenzell, which joined the Confederacy the following year). Swiss domination over these territories was confirmed by the Peace of Fribourg:

- Bailiwick of Lugano (Vogtei Lauis; Baliaggio di Lugano);
- Bailiwick of Locarno (Vogtei Luggarus; Baliaggio di Locarno);
- Bailiwick of Vallemaggia (Vogtei Meynthal or Vogtei Maiental; Baliaggio della Vallemaggia);
- Bailiwick of Mendrisio (Vogtei Mendris; Baliaggio di Mendrisio), conquered in 1517 and administered in 1522.

Three other bailiwicks were temporarily conquered at the same time but lost after the Peace of Fribourg in 1516 and now form municipalities in Lombardy, Italy:

- Luino;
- Cuvio;
- Eschental (current Val d'Ossola); previously conquered around 1418 but lost in 1422.

At the same time, the Three Leagues of the Grisons, allies of the Confederacy, seized the bailiwicks of Bormio, Chiavenna, and the Valtellina.

After the Peace of Fribourg, the southern borders of the Old Confederacy remained unchanged until 1798. With the creation of the Helvetic Republic, the bailiwicks of Bellinzona, Riviera, and Blenio, together with Leventina, formed the Canton of Bellinzona and the bailiwicks of Lugano, Locarno, Vallemaggia, and Mendrisio formed the Canton of Lugano. These two cantons were merged in 1803 after the Act of Mediation to form the Canton of Ticino.

=== Other bailiwicks ===
Other regions of Switzerland also formed common bailiwicks, but only between two cantons.

- Common bailiwicks of Bern and Fribourg:
  - County of Grasburg from 1423, whose seat was moved to Schwarzenburg in 1575;
  - Bailiwick of Grandson (1475);
  - Bailiwick of Orbe and Échallens (1475);
  - Bailiwick of Murten, from 1476.
- Common bailiwicks of Glarus and Schwyz:
  - Bailiwick of Uznach (1469);
  - Bailiwick of Windegg / Gaster (1438);
  - Gams, attached to the bailiwick of Gaster in 1497.
- Common bailiwicks of Bern and Solothurn:
  - Bailiwick of Bipp from 1413 to 1463, then reverting entirely to Bern.
  - Bailiwick of Bechburg from 1419 to 1463, then reverting entirely to Solothurn.
  - Landgraviate of Buchsgau, purchased by Bern and Solothurn in 1426. It involved regalian rights and high justice over the bailiwicks of Bipp, Bechburg, and Falkenstein (the latter in Solothurn's hands since 1402). In the 1463 partition, each canton obtained the landgraviate rights over its own territories.

=== Associated states ===
The bailiwick system was used similarly in the two confederations allied with the Swiss Confederacy. The Seven Tithings administered the Lower Valais and the Lötschental in the manner of bailiwicks, just as the Three Leagues did in the Valtellina, at Bormio and at Chiavenna.

== See also ==
- Growth of the Old Swiss Confederacy
- Tagsatzung
- Transalpine campaigns of the Old Swiss Confederacy
- Condominium (international law)
- Vogtei Rheintal
- County of Sargans
