= Postes, télégraphes et téléphones =

Postes, télégraphes et téléphones may refer to:

- Postes, télégraphes et téléphones (France)
- Postes, télégraphes, téléphones (Switzerland)
