= PTT (Switzerland) =

Swiss Postal Telegraph and Telephone agency

Swiss PTT
- Type: Public service
- Industry: Mail, Telecommunications
- Founded: 1852 / 1928
- Defunct: January 1, 1998
- Fate: European liberalization of mail and telecommunications
- Headquarters: Bern
- Revenue: 1.6 billion Swiss francs
- Number of employees: 58,431 (before dissolution)

The Swiss PTT (Post, Telephone and Telegraph Enterprises) (German: Schweizerische Post-, Telephon- und Telegraphen-Betriebe, French: Postes, télégraphes et téléphones, Italian: Poste, telegrafi e telefoni) was the postal, telegraph, and telephone agency of Switzerland, from 1928 to 1998. The PTT were the state authority for mail, telephone, telegraph and fax services in Switzerland and Liechtenstein between 1852 and January 1, 1998. The predecessor of the PTT was the Swiss Post, which was already founded in 1847 during the Sonderbund War. With the entry into force of the Swiss Federal Constitution in 1848, the post was placed under state supervision and transformed into the Federal Post. In the mid-1880s, the Federal Post turned to building a telephone network. In the 1920s, efforts were made to unite the then Post and Telegraph Directorates. These succeeded in 1928 with the founding of the PTT.

During the Second as well as the First World War, the PTT or the Swiss Post were intensively occupied with delivering internee mail. In the course of the European liberalization of telecommunications, the PTT were dissolved on January 1, 1998, and their tasks transferred to Swiss Post and Swisscom. While Swiss Post remained a government agency with a partial service monopoly (it was converted into a statutory Aktiengesellschaft in 2013), Swisscom became a competitor on a liberalised telecommunications market and is an Aktiengesellschaft of which the Confederation holds a majority of shares.

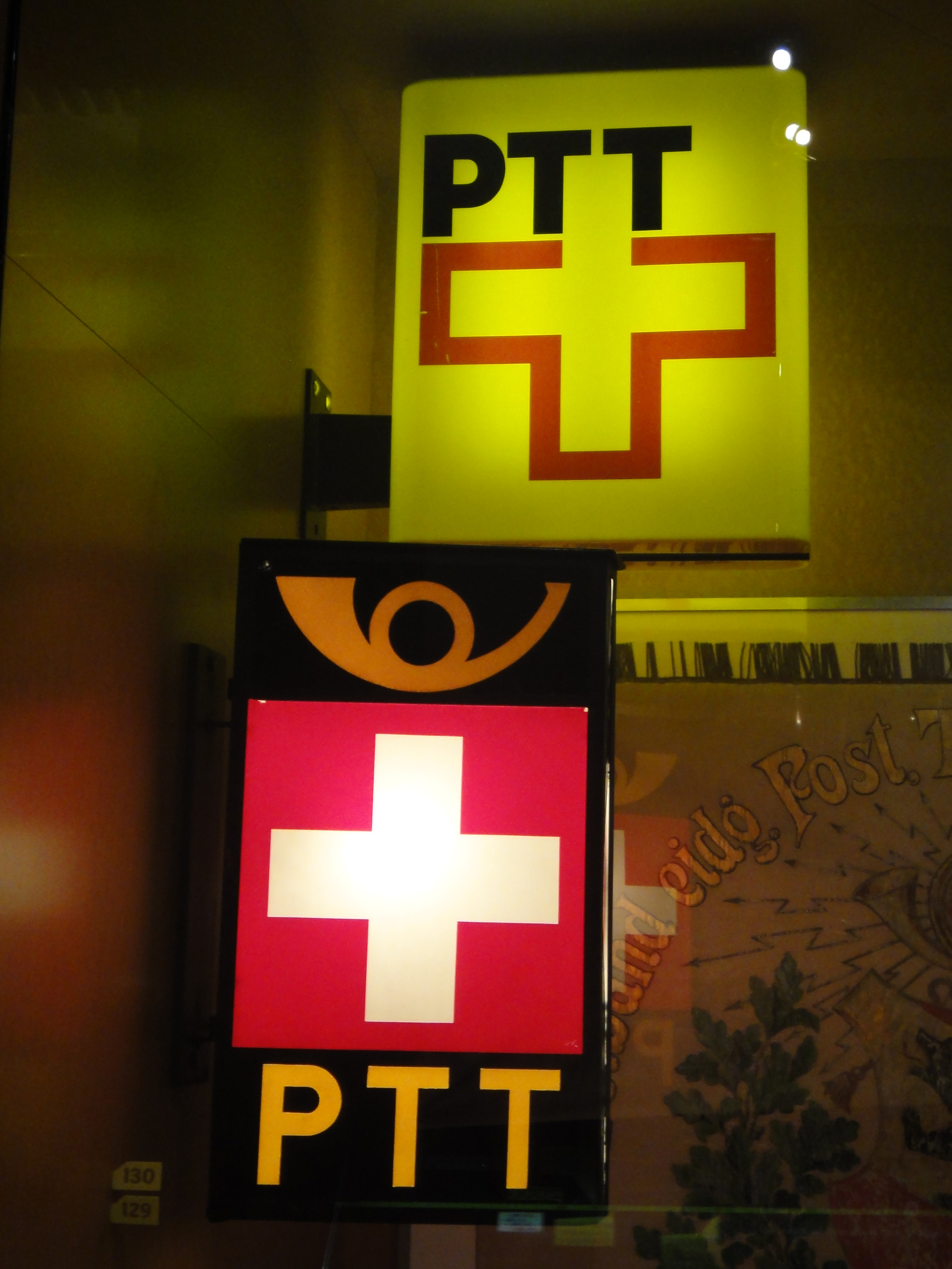
PTT signs from 1938 (bottom) and 1988 (top)

== History ==
=== Postal system in the Helvetic Republic ===
In 1798, the Old Swiss Confederacy collapsed under the military and political pressure of France. The Helvetic Republic replaced the loose structure of the 13 cantons with their associated places as a centralized state from April 12, 1798. Following mercantilist logic, the postal system was to be controlled only by the centralized state. The first attempt to centralize the cantonal postal enterprises was not made by the Grand Council (today: National Council), but by the Directory in Aarau (government, today: Federal Council in Bern) with the Postal Service Clothing Regulation of May 5, 1798. The legal basis, the postal monopoly, only gained legal force from September 1, 1798, through the Grand Council and the Senate (today: Council of States). Organizationally, the Helvetic Post took shape with the law on the establishment of a "Regie Post Administration" and the setting of uniform postal rates from November 16, 1798. The local location of the postal central administration proved problematic. In 1798, no fixed seat of government for the Republic was decided. The capital was to rotate between Aarau, Lucerne, Basel, Zurich and Bern.

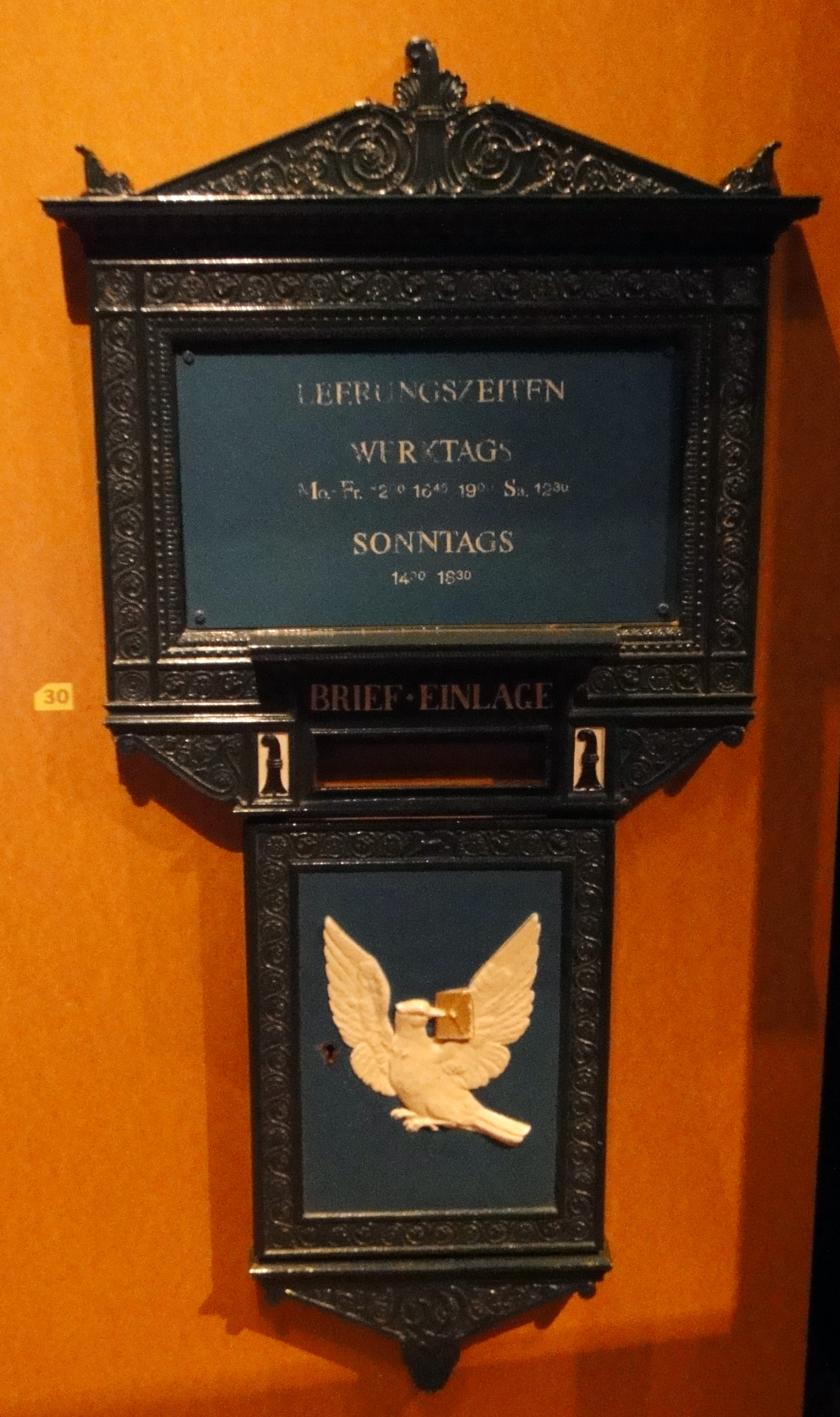
Letter box of the Basel Cantonal Post, around 1845 (Museum of Communication, Bern)

The centralization of the post provided for the creation of five postal districts. The first postal district was Basel. The second postal district Zurich included the regions Zurich, Baden, Aargau, Graubünden, Glarus, Waldstätten, Bellinzona and Lugano. St. Gallen with the cantons Säntis and Linth was the third postal district. The fourth postal district Schaffhausen, comprising the same canton, was followed by the fifth postal district Bern with the areas Bern, Oberland, Léman, Freiburg, Solothurn and Wallis. However, the Canton of Valais was briefly an independent republic from 1802 due to its separation from the Helvetic Republic.

As a result of internal unrest by federalist insurgents ("Stecklikrieg") in the summer of 1802, the Helvetic Republic was short-lived. General and First Consul Bonaparte – from 1804 Emperor Napoleon – intervened in 1802 and had the cantonal sovereignty restored through the Act of Mediation. During the Mediation act (1803–1815), the centralized state transformed into a loose confederation of 19 cantons (without Geneva, Valais, Neuchâtel, Bishopric of Basel and Biel). The central power was limited to a minimum, and a Landammann of Switzerland replaced the Directory of the Helvetic Republic. The representatives of the cantons decided at the reintroduced Diet in Fribourg in 1803, as a direct consequence, the dissolution of the central postal administration on September 10, 1803.

The Federal Treaty of August 7, 1815 replaced the Act of Mediation of 1803, but the regained cantonal postal sovereignty remained until the founding of the federal state.

=== From confederation to federal state ===
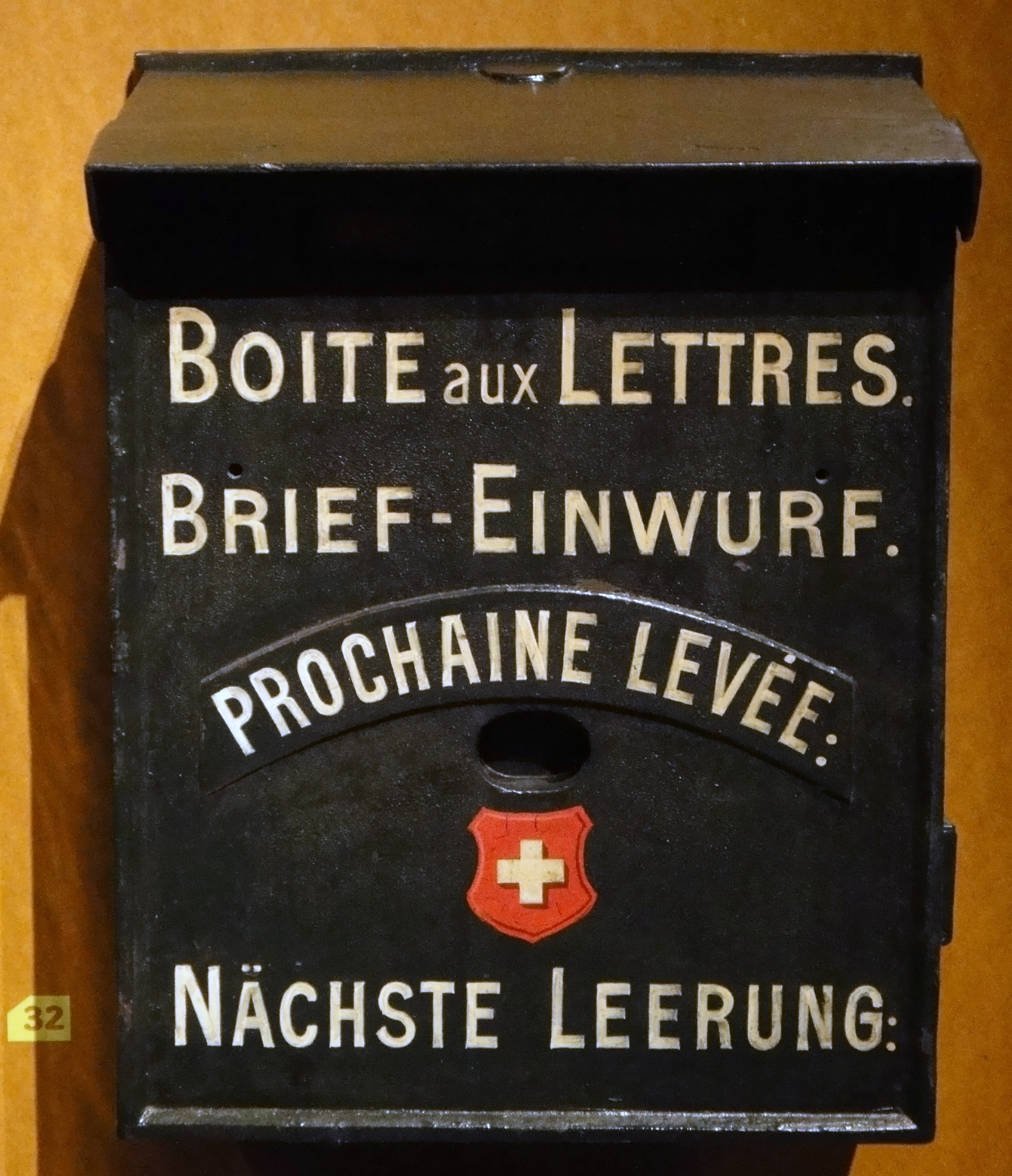
Post box, 1880 (Museum of Communication, Bern)

The Swiss Post was created after the Sonderbund War (1847) in the course of the founding of the Swiss federal state of 1848, whose constitution of September 12, 1848 came into force. The formerly 17 cantonal postal administrations and a central one were to be united under the roof of the Post and Construction Department (today: DETEC) under the supervision of the Swiss Federal Council according to the federal resolution of the federal councils of November 28, 1848. With the laws on the postal monopoly and postal organization of June 4, 1849, the Federal Post took shape. The takeover by the Confederation was set for January 1, 1849, but only took place on October 1, 1849, with the entry into force of the uniform tariff law. The Basel Benedikt La Roche-Stehelin held the office of General Director of the Federal Post. Political oversight lay with the St. Gallen Federal Councillor Wilhelm Matthias Naeff. From the 18 federal postal districts, eleven were created at that time. This division lasted until 1911 and was only slightly changed by the transfer of the Canton of Zug from the Zurich postal district to the Lucerne postal district. The district postal directorates replaced the cantonal postal directorates. The total staff one year after the establishment of the organization was 2,803 people.

With the first complete revision of the Federal Constitution of May 29, 1874, the Federal Assembly freed the Confederation from the obligation of financial postal monopoly compensation to the cantons. In addition, Article 36 of the Constitution received an addition regarding the telegraph system. From then on, not only the postal but also the telegraph system in the territory of the Confederation was purely a federal matter. The revenue of the "Post and Telegraph Administration" flowed into the federal treasury.

The founding of the Universal Postal Union with Switzerland as a founding member also fell in the year 1874.

=== Building loose telephone networks ===
Pioneer in the field of telephony was the German Empire. The Swiss Telegraph Directorate, taking the Empire as a model, ordered the first telephone devices from the company Siemens & Halske in 1877. In December 1877, trial operations took place between Bern, Thun and Interlaken as well as in Bellinzona. The Telegraph Directorate did not yet grant private concessions despite requests, but in return allowed the cantonal Interior Department of the Canton of Vaud to connect the psychiatric clinic in Cery by telephone. The Swiss Federal Council subordinated the telephone system to the telegraph monopoly in 1878. This state monopolistic claim of the Telegraph Directorate was not uncontested. Thus, the telephone entrepreneur Wilhelm Ehrenberg filed a complaint with the Swiss Federal Assembly. Nevertheless, the federal councils adhered to the extended postal monopoly.

Change of postal personnel for the onward journey to Splügen or Chiavenna, 1914–1918 (Photo: Walter Mittelholzer)

Initially, the International Bell Telephone Company was in discussion for the network expansion. Wilhelm Ehrenberg, in turn, submitted an application for the company Kuhn & Ehrenberg to build a central telephone station in Zurich, which made a name for itself with the telephone transmission of the federal singing festival in Zurich via a line to Basel. The "Central Telephone Station in Zurich" officially went into operation on October 2, 1880. However, the private Zurich telephone company remained an episode. In 1886, the Confederation took over the Zurich network. In the other Swiss cities, the Telegraph Directorate itself was responsible for building the telephone network. The Post and Railway Department of Federal Councillor Simeon Bavier granted permission for this in 1880. The number of subscribers was decisive for the expansion. "While in Basel the Telegraph Directorate itself went in search of participants," in the other cities the private commercial, industrial or banking associations helped in their own interest in the search for subscribers. Thus, loose telephone networks first emerged in the cities, then in larger municipalities, which were only gradually connected to each other.

Loading of mail bags in front of the field post office in Delémont, 1914–18

=== First World War ===
Swiss postal traffic with abroad was severely restricted by the outbreak of war in 1914. In particular, deliveries overseas could not be guaranteed, as the shipments fell victim to the submarine warfare several times. With Italy's entry into the war in 1915, the situation escalated further. Neutral Switzerland took over the delivery of internee mail during the First World War. The resulting additional financial expense was partially reimbursed to Switzerland by some states after the end of the war in 1918.

Eavesdropping protocol of a telephone conversation between Robert Grimm and Ernst Nobs from November 8, 1918

Explosively, on November 8, 1918, in the run-up to the Swiss general strike, telephone conversations between Robert Grimm and Ernst Nobs and Rosa Bloch (see source) were eavesdropped. Through telegram and telephone censorship, the PTT tried to interrupt the connection between the local strike committees and the general strike leadership. For example, Ticino remained communicatively isolated during the strike. In March 1919, the national strike trial against 21 members of the strike leadership then took place.

=== Interwar period and founding of the PTT ===
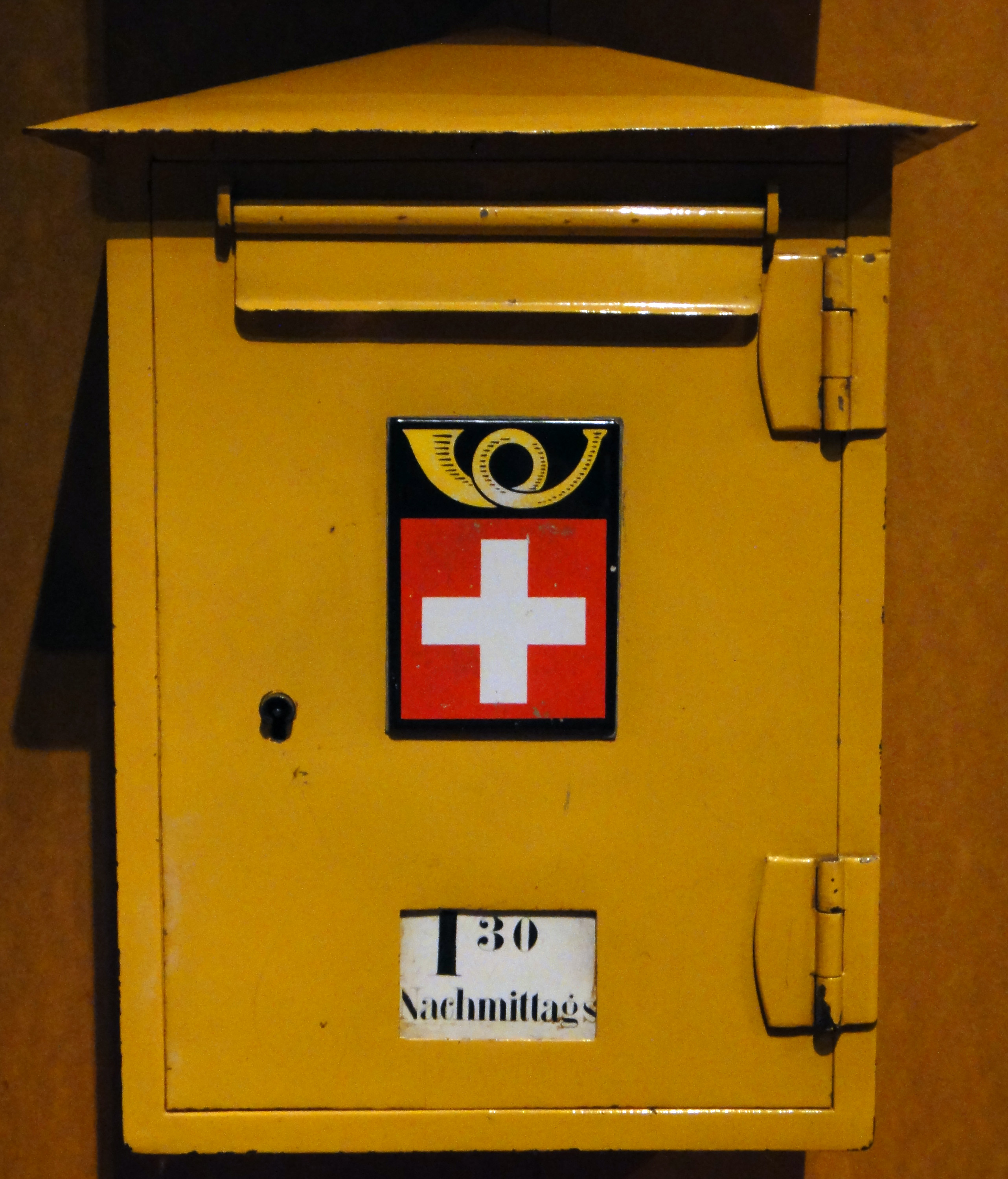
Post box, 1920 (Museum of Communication, Bern)

The interwar period brought great challenges for the Swiss Post. The Great Depression at the beginning of the 1930s led to a decline in postal traffic, whereupon the General Directorate took rationalization measures, which also included staff reductions. From 1920, the first steps were taken to organizationally combine the postal system with the telephone and telegraph system. In 1928, Reinhold Furrer was appointed the first General Director of the newly founded Swiss Post, Telephone and Telegraph Enterprises (PTT).

In 1939, the PTT General Directorate decided to use postal yellow for all purposes. The color had already been introduced in 1849, but letter boxes were painted dark green for a long time and post office signs red-white.

=== Second World War ===
The outbreak of war in Europe in the first days of September 1939 also had far-reaching consequences for the Swiss Post, which was networked across Europe, on very different levels. First of all, the war meant a decline in civilian letter mail transport at home and abroad for the PTT. However, the statistics point to longer-term trends. Thus, letter and parcel post as well as newspaper traffic to Germany, but also to the other neighboring countries, slowly declined already in the 1930s. The takeover of power by the National Socialists in Germany had a particularly inhibiting influence on newspaper traffic, which was increasingly subject to censorship. In the decline of letter post, it can be assumed that the competition from the emerging telegram partially displaced letter post. In contrast to the declining trends of regular post, the area of field post grew enormously in numbers. New in the Second World War were the handling of internee mail as well as prisoner-of-war mail.

Staff of the PTT administration, 1939–1945

PTT total staff between 1939 and 1945

The staff in the administration increased continuously during the war years (see diagram). The proportion of women during this period was an average of 26.2%, falling from 30.8% (1944) to 27.9% (1945) at the end of the war. The total PTT staff only decreased between the years 1939 and 1941 from 21,809 via 21,252 to 21,216 people. At the end of 1945, the PTT employed 23,171 people compared to 21,809 in 1939. Calculated on the entire workforce, there were an average of 18 women per 100 employees (17.7%) in these years. The Swiss Post employed female employees mainly as non-civil servant telephone operators.

==== Postal traffic with Germany ====
Postal traffic with Germany remained largely unaffected during the Second World War. However, the fact that German postal officials were still allowed to move freely into the city of Basel caused discussions. In 1939, the PTT had decided to continue allowing the German Reichspost cars to go to the post office Basel 17 Transit, which was located in the SBB station: on the one hand due to more efficient handling, on the other hand due to national security. The PTT feared a change in practice and thus a postal exchange at the border, which meant additional effort and traffic obstruction. In addition, for reasons of national security, they did not want to offend the German side.

The war led to extended transmission and delivery times. Delays also occurred in Swiss postal traffic due to the German and French censorship authorities. The war thus had a great influence on Switzerland's postal traffic with abroad.

==== Prisoner-of-war mail ====
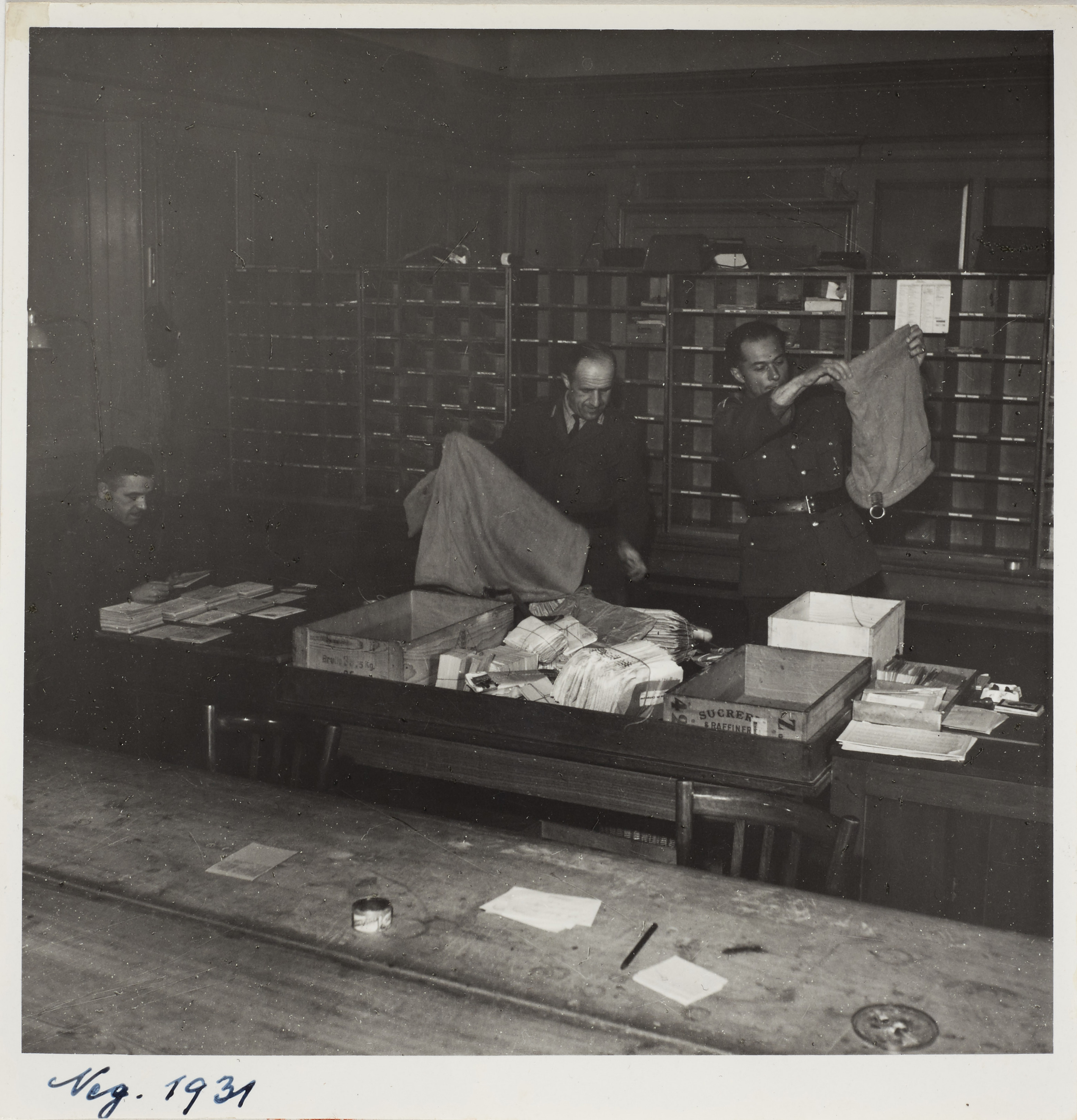
Internee mail, probably Büren an der Aare, Canton of Bern

Fully loaded German railway car, First World War

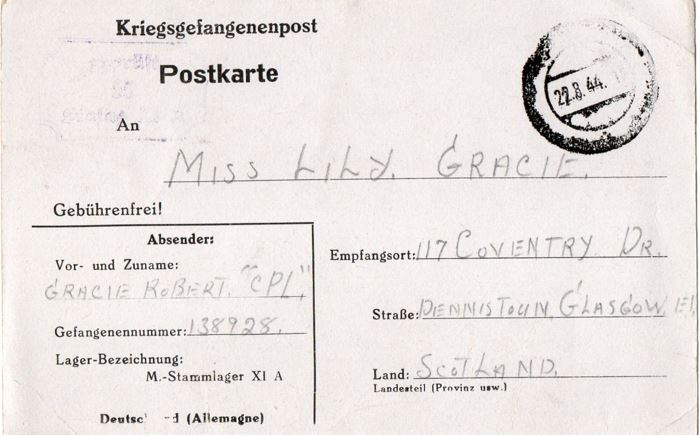
Postcard from a Scottish prisoner of war in Stalag XI-A to the family in Glasgow, August 1944. The card is a pre-printed form for prisoner-of-war mail with the camp number indicated at the bottom.

The PTT played a central role in international postal traffic during the Second World War. Since Switzerland officially remained neutral while the neighboring countries were at war, its location was predestined to take over the mediation of prisoner-of-war mail. The responsible parties assumed a positional war in the West and did not expect many prisoners. They therefore assumed that the mediation of prisoner-of-war mail – in contrast to the First World War – would only involve a small effort.

They advocated proactively mediating the prisoner-of-war mail. That is, the PTT approached the belligerent countries and offered themselves as mediators. In this way, the PTT could also assign a role to the politically isolated Switzerland on the international stage. The mediator role also strengthened national security and neutrality. A financial motivation of the PTT can be ruled out, as prisoner-of-war shipments are exempt from all taxes according to Article 16 of the Hague Land Warfare Convention. Switzerland received only a small compensation as a transit country for prisoner-of-war mail.

On October 24, 1939, the first load of prisoner-of-war mail from Germany destined for southern France arrived in Basel 17 Transit. It consisted of 200 postcards from French prisoners of war, who wrote on pre-printed cards that they had been taken prisoner and were doing well.

From December 1, 1939, a car with German prisoner-of-war mail from France rolled daily via Basel 17 Transit to Frankfurt am Main. In the opposite direction, the mail from French people in German captivity was handed over by the German Reichspost to the post office Basel 17 Transit, where it was reloaded by the PTT and forwarded via Geneva to France. From 1940, the PTT also mediated postal traffic between Germany and Great Britain and its colonies. To circumvent the war turmoil, detours were accepted. Prisoner-of-war mail between Germany and Great Britain was partly handled via Spain and Gibraltar.

The mediation of prisoner-of-war mail was associated with numerous difficulties. Rail traffic was partly interrupted, and with increasing war duration, the required transport opportunities were lacking, especially rolling stock. Towards the end of the war, the Swiss Federal Railways refused to provide rolling stock for mail transport to Germany. The German side did not send the wagons back, whereby over 1000 Swiss wagons were lost in Germany.

The international postal network was so impaired by the war that smooth postal traffic was no longer possible. This had negative consequences especially for mail shipments with perishable contents. The PTT General Directorate noted in June 1940 regarding prisoner-of-war packages that due to interrupted postal connections, "signs of rot and spoilage" were noticeable in the shipments that had been underway for weeks. Food therefore had to be partially disposed of. This particularly affected the border transit stations Basel 17 and Genf 2. In the first third of 1942, a total of 153 railway wagons filled with prisoner-of-war parcel mail were dispatched from Basel 17 to Germany. This number gives an idea of the amount of spoiled food that had to be destroyed due to lack of delivery options. In times of food rationing, such waste was poorly received by the population. In 1945, the post office Basel 17 was heavily criticized in a letter to the editor in the newspaper Die Nation because the perishable food had not been distributed to the Swiss population. At that time, so many prisoner-of-war packages were backed up that the said post office had to store part of the shipments on the platforms, as all storage rooms were already overcrowded. In cooperation with the International Committee of the Red Cross, perishable food could finally be further utilized. Part of the packages was also sent back to the countries of origin.

=== Post-war period ===
In the meantime, the PTT were also responsible for the state radio and television broadcasts in Switzerland and, after the founding of the Swiss Broadcasting Corporation (SRG) in 1931, for the maintenance of the SRG studios until the end of the 1980s.

The PTT replaced the last manually operated telephone exchange in Switzerland on December 3, 1959.

On October 1, 1964, the postal code system with four digits common in Switzerland today was introduced to simplify sorting. Now, personnel with very extensive knowledge of Swiss geography were no longer needed. These postal codes were ultimately also the basis for the mechanical sorting of letters and packages.

In May 1977, a new parcel post center was opened in Däniken. In Zurich, the Herdern telecommunications operations center by Theo Hotz was completed in 1978; the Mülligen parcel post center in Schlieren followed in 1985. Another major PTT building was the short-lived "New Sihlpost", which was built between 1985 and 1992.

In 1978, before the first ATM, the "Postomat" was introduced.

Logo of Telecom (Telecommunications Department)

The PTT reform introduced cost transparency in 1990, ended cross-subsidization and split the PTT in 1993 into Post PTT and Telecom PTT.

On February 1, 1991, Express, A- and B-Post were introduced at the PTT. The price of an A-Post stamp was now 80 rappen instead of 50 rappen for B-Post. To mark the letter as A-Post, an "A" now had to be added next to the stamp.

On February 8, 1994, the Sihlpost robbery took place. In 1995, the so-called "PubliCar" was introduced. This is a kind of post bus that can be ordered by phone call.

In 1996, Swisspost International was founded. This is and was a branch of the PTT abroad. The core business is the shipping and delivery of documents and goods in cross-border traffic abroad. On September 1, 1997, the Fraumünster post office robbery took place.

Shortly before their dissolution in 1998, the PTT were the largest employer in Switzerland.

In the course of the European liberalization of telecommunications, the PTT were dissolved on January 1, 1998, and their tasks transferred to Swiss Post and Swisscom.

== Organizational structure of the PTT ==
History of the Central Administration of the Post, Telegraph and Telephone Enterprises
- 1849: General Post Directorate
- 1879: Upper Post Directorate
- 1927: Federal Post and Telegraph Administration
- 1928: PTT General Directorate
- 1935: Swiss Post and Telegraph Administration
- 1936: Swiss Post, Telegraph and Telephone Administration (PTT)
- 1960: Swiss Post, Telephone and Telegraph Enterprises (PTT)
- 1993: The Post / La Poste / La Posta PTT
- 1998: The Post / La Poste / La Posta (Swiss Post)
- Source: PTT-Archiv

=== General Directorate (PTT) ===
As the first General Post Director, the Federal Council appointed the Basel Benedikt La Roche-Stehelin to office on January 9, 1849. In July of the same year, La Roche-Stehelin resigned due to differences of opinion with the head of the Post and Construction Department, Federal Councillor Naeff. Differences existed regarding the number of officials and the level of salary within the central administration. The position remained vacant until January 1, 1879, and was filled by the head of the Post Department.

Only with the federal law of August 21, 1878, did the federal councils create financial incentives to refill the top official, who was now called Upper Post Director. From January 1, 1879, the Upper Post Directorate emerged from the General Directorate of the Post. The new Post Law of 1910 expanded the powers of the Upper Post Directorate only slightly, but regulated the organization of the central administration. In August 1920, the Upper Post Directorate took over the telegraph administration. Through the founding of the PTT in 1928, the name of the central administration also changed from Upper Post Directorate to PTT General Directorate. The Federal Assembly expanded the responsibilities twice: in October 1930 and in March 1946. Neither the Federal Council nor the Federal Assembly was responsible for general business management (fees, post concessions, salaries, etc.), which was now reserved solely for the General Directorate.

In 1961, a new PTT organization law came into force. The now three-member PTT administration, instead of a single General Director, divided into the internal departments Post, Telecommunications Service and Presidential Department. In 1970, it received a board of directors with authority to issue directives to the PTT administration.

=== TT Directorate ===
Administrative designations of the Telegraph and Telephone Enterprises
- 1852: Federal Telegraph Administration; Telegraph Inspection Districts
- 1854: Federal Telegraph Directorate
- 1880: Federal Telegraph and Telephone Administration
- 1909: Federal Upper Telegraph Directorate
- 1927: Federal Post and Telegraph Administration
- 1935: Swiss Post and Telegraph Administration
- 1936: Swiss Post, Telegraph and Telephone Administration (PTT)
- 1938: Telephone Directorate; District Telephone Directorates (KTD)
- 1960: Swiss Post, Telephone and Telegraph Enterprises (PTT)
- 1983: Telecommunications District Directorates (FKD)
- 1993: Telecom PTT
- 1994: Telecommunications Directorates (FD) / Telecommunications Directorates (TD)
- 1997: Swisscom AG
- Source: PTT-Archiv

The Swiss Telegraph Administration existed de facto since 1854, after the Federal Council had passed a corresponding law. In 1883, the Telegraph Administration was additionally tasked with leading the emerging telephone system. In 1928, the telephone and telegraph administration finally became part of the PTT, whereby the TT Directorate was now subordinate to the PTT General Director.

In 1961, the General Directorate was restructured and from then on consisted of one director each for post and telecommunications as well as a presidential department head.

=== Post ===
==== District postal directorates ====
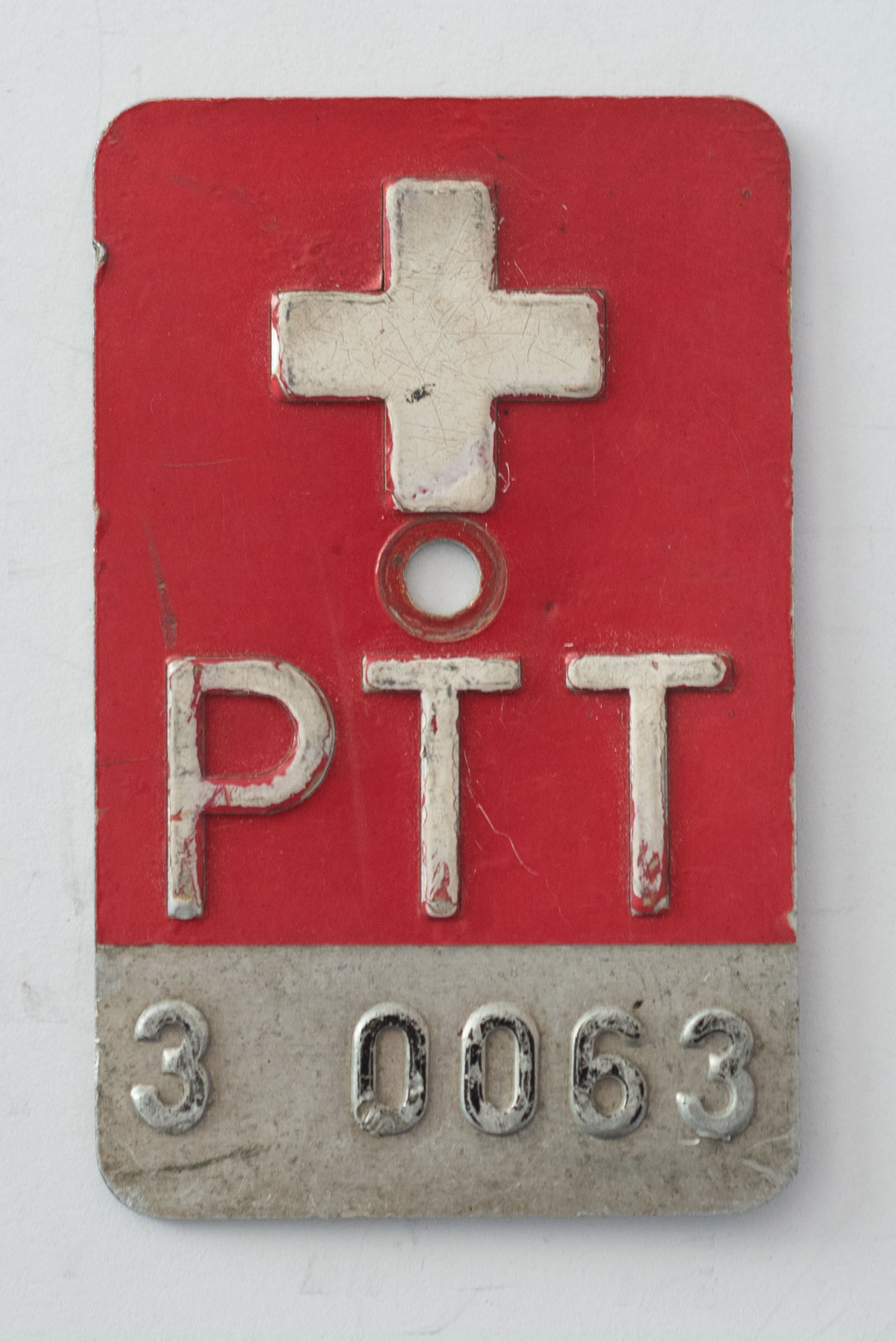
Bicycle number Postal District 3: Bern

The postal area of Switzerland was already divided into so-called postal districts from 1849. At that time, the Federal Council proposed to create eleven such postal districts, against which resistance arose, as the number seemed too high to many deputies. Others advocated operating one postal district per canton, as this would have allowed the cantonal posts from before 1848 to continue. Nevertheless, the proposal to establish eleven postal districts was ultimately successful.

Eleven postal districts of Switzerland from 1849
1. Postal District Geneva, with the canton of the same name and the Vaud district of Nyon
2. Postal District Lausanne, with the Canton of Vaud (without Nyon) as well as the Cantons of Fribourg and Valais
3. Postal District Bern, without the Bernese Jura and with the district of Laufen
4. Postal District Neuchâtel, with the Bernese Jura and without the district of Laufen
5. Postal District Basel, with the Cantons of Basel-Landschaft, Basel-Stadt and Solothurn (without a few Solothurn municipalities assigned to the Aarau postal district)
6. Postal District Aarau, with the Canton of Aargau and some Solothurn municipalities
7. Postal District Lucerne, with the Cantons of Lucerne, Zug, Uri and Unterwalden as well as the Schwyz districts of Schwyz, Gersau and Küssnacht
8. Postal District Zurich, with the Cantons of Zurich, Schaffhausen and Thurgau
9. Postal District St. Gallen, with the Canton of St. Gallen without the Sargans district, the two Appenzell cantons and Glarus as well as the Schwyz districts of Einsiedeln, March and Höfe
10. Postal District Chur, with the Canton of Graubünden without the Moesa district as well as the St. Gallen district of Sargans
11. Postal District Bellinzona, with the Canton of Ticino as well as the Moesa district

Apart from minor border shifts, the postal districts remained as they were, although there were always voices advocating a tighter administration and accordingly favoring only five or six postal districts.

Each postal district received a director, whose main task was to inspect his post offices and to ensure that operations met expectations. However, the district postal directors often had too little time and too little personnel to carry out regular inspections.

==== Post offices ====
With the founding of the Federal Post in 1849, the post offices were also created to handle operational services. The post offices at the seat of the district postal directorate were called main post offices and, due to their size, were usually divided into sub-departments.

From 1870, the offices were divided into three classes. The post offices class I were the large post offices and post offices class 2 those that could have at least two officials. Finally, post offices class 3 were the small offices that were run only by a postmaster.

Number of post offices
Year	Number
1970	4,100
1975	3,972
1980	3,917
1985	3,880
1990	3,830
1995	3,646
1996	3,530
1997	3,646

===== Basel 16 Badischer Bahnhof =====
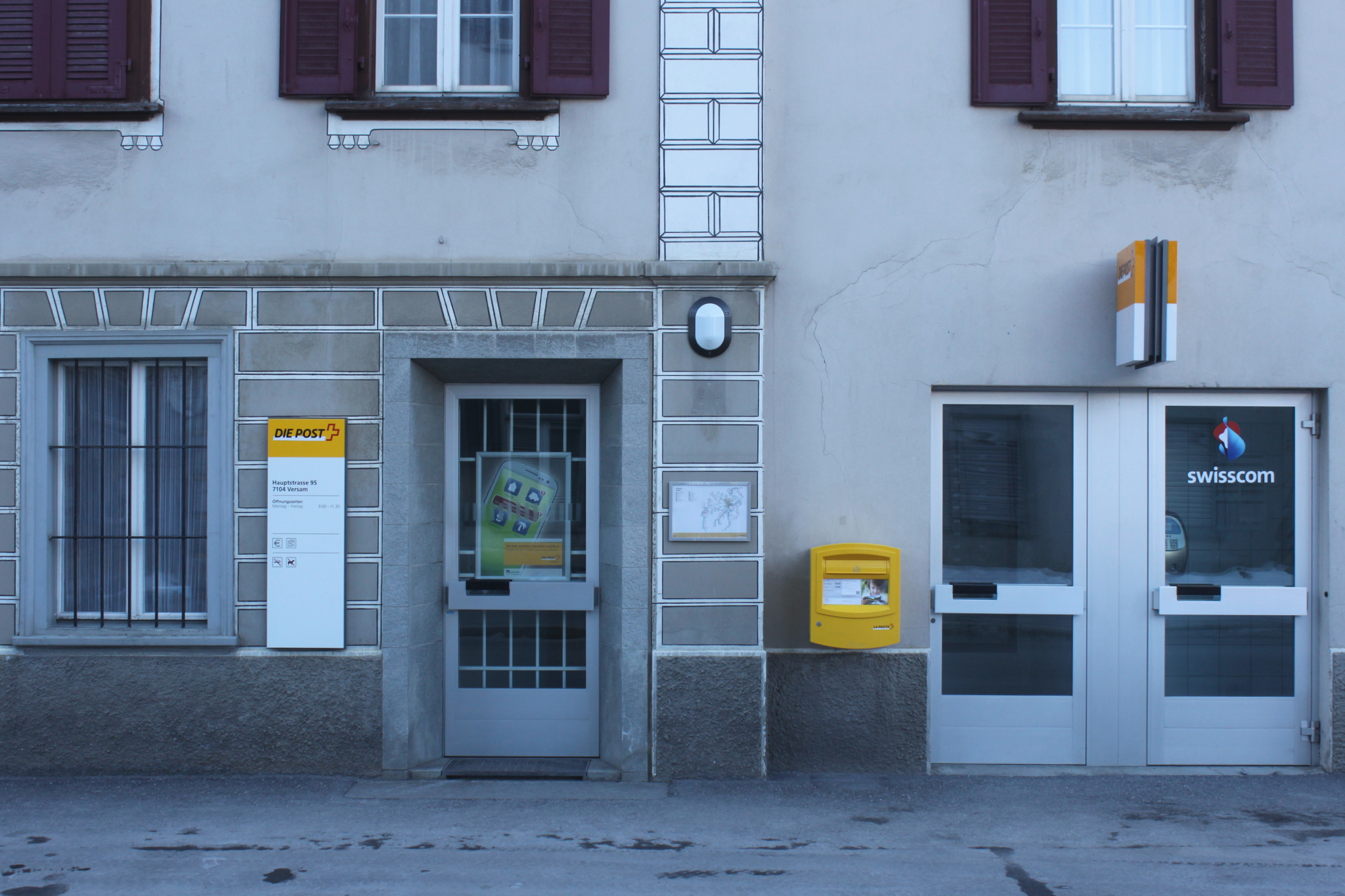
Post in Versam (2015)

The post office Basel 16 Badischer Bahnhof is a special case among the 1464 branches (as of 2015): It is located on the grounds of the Badischer Bahnhof and thus on German customs territory. In the treaty of 1852 between Switzerland and the Grand Duchy of Baden, which regulated the construction of the Badischer Bahnhof on Swiss soil, a Swiss post office within the station grounds was also provided for. It was opened in 1862 with the designation "Basel Badischer Bahnhof". From 1913, this post office took over the internal German reloading service of the railway post "against compensation", although the exact conditions are not known.

In the treaty of 1933, the joint use of the infrastructure of the Badischer Bahnhof was regulated. This concerned the so-called baggage and express goods tunnel facilities, which connected the tracks underground and thus accelerated mail loading. Said facilities were rented by the Deutsche Reichsbahn-Gesellschaft to the PTT as well as to the Deutsche Reichspost equally, with the respective rental share proportional to the use. In the agreement of 1935 between the Reichspostministerium and the PTT, the "compensations for services in the interest of the German postal service", especially for the "handling of internal German postal service", were renegotiated and fixed. The Deutsche Reichspost compensated the PTT for the wages of seven workers, amounting to 35,000 francs annually.

Between 1914 and 1919, the post office remained closed due to the First World War and the resulting occupation of the Badischer Bahnhof by Swiss troops. During the Second World War, the post office maintained its operations. However, the Swiss letter boxes located on the platforms were removed in 1940 for "foreign exchange policy reasons", presumably to prevent the sending of Swiss francs abroad.

Today, the post office is operated under the designation "4016 Basel Bad. Bahnhof".

===== Basel 17 Transit =====
The post office Basel 17 Transit mediates the items entering and exiting via Basel in traffic with abroad.

Since 1878, there was a traveling post transit office in the immediate vicinity of the Badischer Bahnhof, whose task was to handle postal traffic with the Deutsche Reichspost. Around the same time, the then Centralbahnhof took over the item exchange with France, Belgium, Great Britain and Alsace. For this task, a parcel transit office was then created in 1907. The traveling post transit office had a total traffic of nearly 3.5 million items in 1912. This traffic volume was too large for the old rooms in the Badischer Bahnhof. Therefore, a new building was constructed in the Basel SBB railway station from 1911 to 1913, which represents an island within the station. Seven own sidings led to the new post building.

On September 13, 1913, the transit office at the Badischer Bahnhof was merged with the parcel transit office in the Basel SBB station. The new post office Basel 17 Transit received its own building with separate sidings in the Basel SBB station and comprised a post and customs office. There was close cooperation with the Deutsche Reichspost. Both sides agreed on a joint office within the post office Basel 17 Transit. In this, the PTT took over the administration for the services of both countries and performed work that was exclusively in the interest of the Deutsche Reichspost. The Reichspost operated only a small accounting office. The mail could thus pass the border more efficiently, as it only had to pass one post office.

This close cooperation was continued during the Second World War. Nevertheless, the German Reich also posed a threat. In favor of national security, not wanting to offend the German side, the PTT decided in 1939 to continue allowing the German Reichspost cars to go to Basel Transit. A large part of international postal traffic during the Second World War ran via the post office Basel Transit. Letter and parcel post as well as newspaper traffic between Switzerland and Germany were handled entirely via this post office. Prisoner-of-war mail, which the PTT co-organized after the outbreak of war, passed via Basel Transit. Prisoner-of-war mail passed through Switzerland as a transit country, so this sealed mail did not have to be checked by Swiss customs or censorship authorities. After the outbreak of war, the post office was overcrowded, as postal traffic collapsed overall. Therefore, in contrast to other post offices that suffered from labor shortages due to mobilization, employees were granted vacations. The switch to war timetables initially brought delays in mail traffic to Germany. Delays also occurred due to the German and French censorship authorities.

After the German occupation of France in June 1942, the handling of French postal traffic took place via Basel 17 Transit as a result of control by German authorities. Today, the post office is operated under the designation "4017 Basel 17 Transit".

== Recruitment and career model of personnel at the PTT ==
=== The beginnings 1848–1910 ===
The staff of the postal administration consisted of civil servants and employees after the founding of the Post and Construction Department. The civil servants dealt with all office work, cash and accounting, etc. in operations. In the administrative operations, civil servants dealt with written work, while employees handled manual work, such as postmaster. A prescribed model career in the form of regulations as in Germany or France did not exist de jure for civil servants. The required workers were elected as civil servants based on their prior knowledge and, if necessary, an examination. Until 1868, civil servants were recruited from private assistants and external candidates who did not have to complete a proper apprenticeship. In the long run, this recruitment system was insufficient, so the administration of the Post Department felt compelled to carry out a new regulation of the selection of postal civil servants. With the Federal Council ordinance of April 1869, the employment of postal teaching staff was regulated by law for the first time. Thus, to attract better workers, only candidates who had first proven themselves in an apprenticeship were elected, and the first basis for a PTT career model was created.

The Post Department determined the number of teaching staff to be admitted annually (from 1873, the General Post Directorate was responsible for recruitment). The positions were advertised by the district postal directorates. Both women and men were admitted equally depending on the position. The minimum age of applicants should not be under 16 and the maximum age not over 25 years (in 1873, the maximum age was set at 30). Before the applicants were invited to an examination, the district postal directorates had to inquire as thoroughly as possible about each one.

Excerpt from the candidate list 1869

Excerpt from the candidate list 1869

=== Entrance examination and apprenticeship ===
The examination covered general education, handwriting, arithmetic skills, knowledge of political geography and the national languages. It took place in the presence of the district postal director and an official of the General Post Directorate (from 1873, two officials of the General Post Directorate and the district postal director or his deputy). With the ordinance of March 1895, applicants from the upper classes of a secondary school (gymnasium, cantonal school or technical school) with a passed leaving certificate no longer had to undergo an entrance examination. During the apprenticeship, which usually lasted one year (from 1873 it lasted 18 months and from 1913 two years), the teaching staff was introduced practically and theoretically to all branches of service. During the apprenticeship, the teaching staff had the opportunity to supplement their general education and attend language courses. The apprenticeship was concluded with a patent examination. Depending on the result, the candidate received a patent of the first, second or third class (very satisfactory, satisfactory and mediocre) and from then on became a candidate, whereby access to the patent examination was also open to other persons under certain conditions.

Until the final election, holders of a patent I or II class were used as provisional assistants. For candidates of the patent III class, there was no guarantee of being elected as civil servants. The young people could apply for advertised postal civil servant positions and were then elected as postal commis (postal clerk). This created the first basis for career planning. For the administrative civil servant examination, applicants were only admitted who had been active in operational service for at least 12 years and could demonstrate impeccable performance and behavior. The applicants had to prove orally and in writing a good general education (mother tongue and foreign languages, civics and Swiss history, general literature, economics and law, current issues of social, economic and cultural nature) and thorough specialist knowledge. After passing the examination, the final election of a candidate in the administrative service had to be preceded by a probationary period of at least six months. Not included in the general selection procedure were the few specialist civil servants with higher specialist education, i.e. lawyers, economists, architects, engineers, technicians, etc., as they were initially employed exclusively directly at the General Directorate. These civil servants were selected directly by the department head or the General Director.

For the filling of middle and higher cadre positions in the district administrative service, technically or academically educated personnel was not considered until then. Therefore, it may not be surprising that an overwhelming majority of civil servants in the middle and higher cadre positions in the district administrative service between 1849 and 1949 had previously completed a postal apprenticeship. The following table provides an overview of the distribution of civil servant positions within the General Directorate (central administration), the district postal directorates and other civil servant positions:

Year	General Directorate		District Directorate		Operations		Total
	Number	in %	Number	in %	Number	in %	Total
1850	18	0.6	37	1.3	2,748	98.1	2,803
1890	50	0.7	213	3	6,815	96.3	7,078
1910	130	1	423	3.2	12,730	95.8	13,283
1947	618	3	420	2	19,641	95	20,679

=== Reforms of the recruitment procedure from 1910 ===
The recruitment procedure, which was last adjusted in 1873, showed more and more deficiencies over time. The training of the candidates was unsatisfactory, as few office managers properly took care of the teaching staff and endeavored to guide them methodically. The young people were mostly left to themselves. The impetus for far-reaching change was finally given by the civil servants' association, which demanded a redesign of the apprenticeship. However, the civil servants' association only found a hearing with its petition to the Upper Post Directorate of February 1910, which included the following reform proposals: Increase in the entry age, expansion of the entrance examination, involvement of pedagogical experts in the examination commission, extension of the apprenticeship period, creation of introductory and final courses, careful selection of training offices, obligation of the teaching staff to attend continuing education schools and expanded specialist examination.

In the postal regulation of November 1910 and its implementing provisions, some of the suggestions made by the civil servants' association were taken into account. The minimum age of applicants was raised to 17 years. Only male applicants who had attended a secondary school for two years were admitted to the entrance examination (as early as 1894, the decision was made not to admit women to the certified postal apprenticeship). The Upper Post Directorate was authorized to involve pedagogues as examination experts. More attention was paid to training during the apprenticeship. The newly established curriculum consisted of a practical and a theoretical part. It was the duty of the office manager to guide the apprentice appropriately and to supervise him outside of service as well. Introductory courses were only provided for if there was a need, while a two-week final course was ordered. The district postal directorates were responsible for the attendance of continuing education schools for the teaching staff. The duration of the apprenticeship remained unchanged at 18 months after the reform. When applications from applicants declined noticeably between 1910 and 1912, the minimum age was reduced to 16 years again and the requirement for secondary school education was waived in order not to close the door to the administration for applicants from less affluent circles.

However, the selection of candidates was not only dependent on the examination result, but also on the information obtained about them. Thus, family circumstances, lifestyle and the reputation of the candidate and his parents were relevant aspects. The intellectual and moral suitability of the applicant also played a not insignificant role. Finally, the candidates had to undergo an examination by the trusted doctor of the postal administration. The trusted medical certificate was reviewed by the chief physician of the general federal administration and he assessed whether a candidate was to be considered fit for employment in federal service from a medical point of view.

Example of a staff card: Career of a PTT employee in the first half of the 20th century

=== Introductory courses and final courses for PTT teaching staff ===
In 1929, an introductory course for PTT teaching staff was carried out in Winterthur in a first pilot attempt. The feedback and the positive experiences gained from the first introductory course led to the nationwide establishment of mandatory introductory courses for all PTT teaching staff. The introductory course preceded the actual apprenticeship and lasted three weeks. During the apprenticeship, the teaching staff had the opportunity to attend a one-week theoretical course at the seat of the district postal directorate. A few weeks before the end of the apprenticeship, a three-week final course took place, in which a number of civil servants from administration and operations participated as instructors. The apprenticeship years were followed by the candidate period, which was reduced from 20 months to 12 months at the end of 1947. During the candidate period, the aspiring civil servants were transferred here and there for further practical training, to the city and to the country, but also, and for a longer time, to foreign language areas. Otherwise, after the specialist examination, it was left to each individual how he wanted to further educate himself, generally and professionally.

=== The 1960s to the early 1990s ===
Until and from 1960, the careers of PTT civil servants were also adjusted through several reforms. Thus, in regulation C15, the careers of civil servants were regulated. Here, the entry, transfer and promotion conditions within the PTT administration played an important role. The careers were linked to those of the federal administration and the other federal enterprises. The term monopoly profession was first mentioned in 1967 in the personnel regulations C2, which regulated the training of PTT apprentices. The PTT trained in five monopoly professions: secretarial teaching staff (future cadres), operations assistant teaching staff (counter staff), uniformed operations teaching staff (mail carriers), telephone teaching staff and telegraph teaching staff.

The operational staff	The employees in operations completed a monopoly apprenticeship (i.e., an apprenticeship that allows one to practice a profession at the post). In addition to the so-called "monopolists", trained personnel and auxiliaries also worked in operations. The postal operations knew three major categories of employees.
The certified civil servants	The certified civil servants worked after their apprenticeship as operations secretary at the counter, in dispatch and railway postal service and in operational management functions. Until 1972, women were not admitted.
The operations assistants	The operations assistants operated the counter and worked in the back office and it was mainly women who were active in this profession. Only in 1972 did the first men join.
The uniformed civil servants	The uniformed civil servants worked as mail carriers, in the processing of letters and packages or took over manual work in office service. Until 1973, the profession was reserved for men. Their uniform made them recognizable externally as PTT employees. An advancement to lower cadre positions was possible.

The administrative staff	As in the first half of the 20th century, those who worked at the General Directorate or in a district postal directorate belonged to the administrative staff. Unlike in the first half of the 20th century, a certified civil servant could transfer to the career of higher administrative personnel at the earliest after seven years in postal operations (including apprenticeship) after an internal examination. Similar to the administrative civil servant examination from 1930, general knowledge of national and business economics, history and civics, and mother tongue and foreign language skills were tested. After passing the examination, the civil servants occupied almost all higher functions in the district postal directorates and many in the General Directorate.

=== Career model of a postal operations secretary in the second half of the 20th century ===
1. School preparation	Ideally traffic school, commercial school, secondary school (min. 2 years), matura, teaching patent, KV apprenticeship
2. Suitability assessment	Depending on the school, only suitability assessment or also entrance examination
3. Training (2–3 years)	Training period in a suitable post office or training post office
4. Deepening phase (4–6 years)	Stay in French-speaking Switzerland, dispatch/railway postal service, travel service, postal check service, counter service, airport post offices / customs post offices
5. Preparation phase for cadre position	Assignment in cadre junior staff as course leader, operations supervision, deputy operations cadre, postmaster replacements
6. Cadre function	Cadre function in operations as office chief, postmaster, service chief, office manager (administrator) or administrative tasks at a district directorate or the General Directorate

=== Permeability ===
The permeability between the federal administration and the private sector occurred rarely for a long time. Through measures taken by the Confederation, the federal administration bound the civil servants to itself in the long term and through specifically tailored trainings such as the monopoly professions, the degrees of the PTT enterprise were not recognized in the private sector for a long time. Someone who had previously completed a postal apprenticeship eventually became the top chief of a department within the PTT. On the other hand, the permeability of civil servants within the federal administration (from one department to another department) was somewhat more frequent. For example, some PTT apprentices switched to the diplomatic service, as exemplified by the career of Charles Redard.

Only after the liberalization efforts of the 1990s were more and more degrees recognized in the private sector to promote permeability between federal personnel and the private sector.

== Occupational categories within the PTT ==
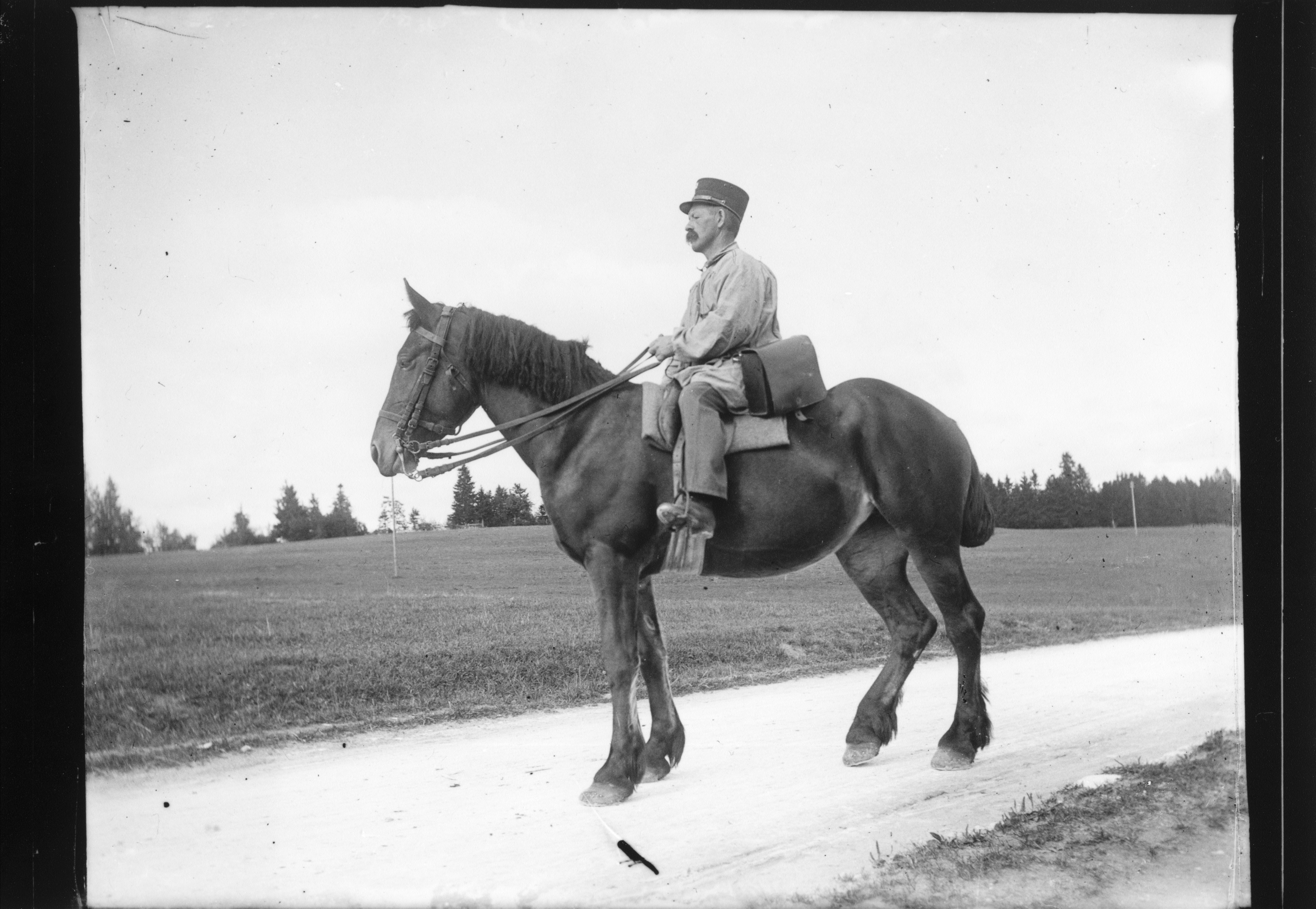
Mail carrier on horseback in the Jura, early 20th century

=== The civil servant status ===
Until the end of the First World War, the employment conditions of federal personnel were relatively incompletely regulated. In 1918, first steps were taken to develop binding, holistic norms. After years of negotiations, the federal law on the service relationship of federal civil servants finally came into force on January 1, 1928. The civil servant status was clearly defined therein. Only those elected by the Federal Council, by a subordinate office or by a federal court for a three-year term of office were civil servants. The federal administration had to advertise the vacant civil servant positions. Only Swiss citizens with an impeccable reputation were eligible for the positions. However, the election as a civil servant could also be made dependent on further prerequisites, for example a certain number of years of service. In 2002, the civil servant status in Switzerland was officially abolished.

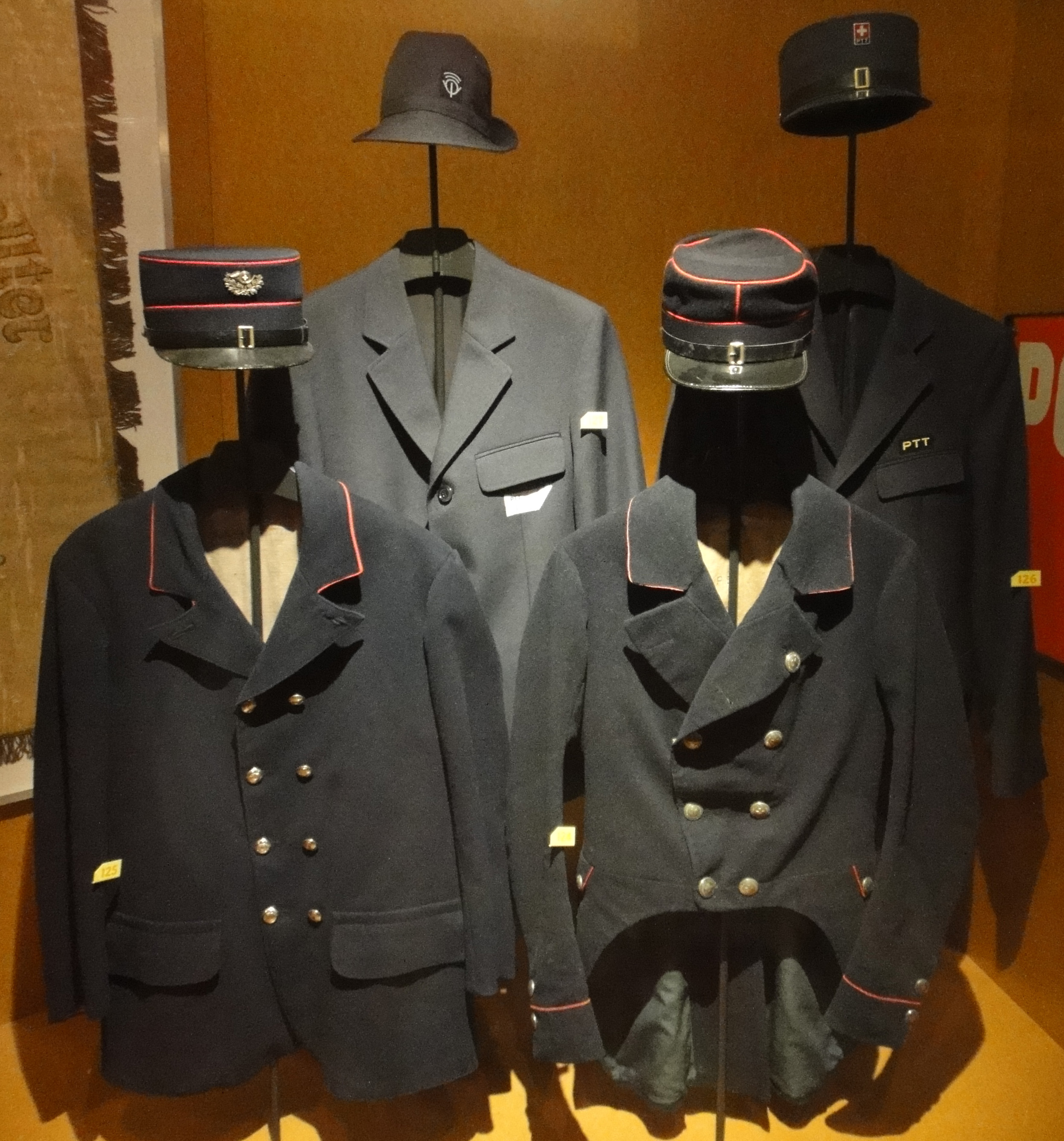
Uniforms of mail carriers 1900, 1980, 1870, 1950 (from left to right; Museum of Communication, Bern)

=== The mail carrier ===
To become a mail carrier, interested parties had to apply directly to one of the eleven district postal directorates in the 1950s. Applicants should generally be between 18 and 23 years old. Foreign language skills were only required in postal districts through which a language border ran. Depending on the postal district, physical requirements were also placed on the applicants. Thus, mail carriers in mountain regions had to have good health, as the work in winter and in bad weather represented a considerable physical strain. The highest-ranking uniformed civil servants among the mail carriers were the operations assistants, who mainly performed activities in the diversion offices. Since 1963, women have officially been admitted as mail carriers.

=== The postal assistant ===
The postal assistant was primarily responsible for counter and office work. From the mid-20th century, 18- to 22-year-olds could enter a twelve-month vocational apprenticeship. Another requirement was the completion of a commercial or secondary school. The work was mainly carried out by female employees. The private postal assistants worked in smaller rural post offices and were employed by a postmaster, with whom they completed a one-year apprenticeship. This was followed by another year of training at another post office.

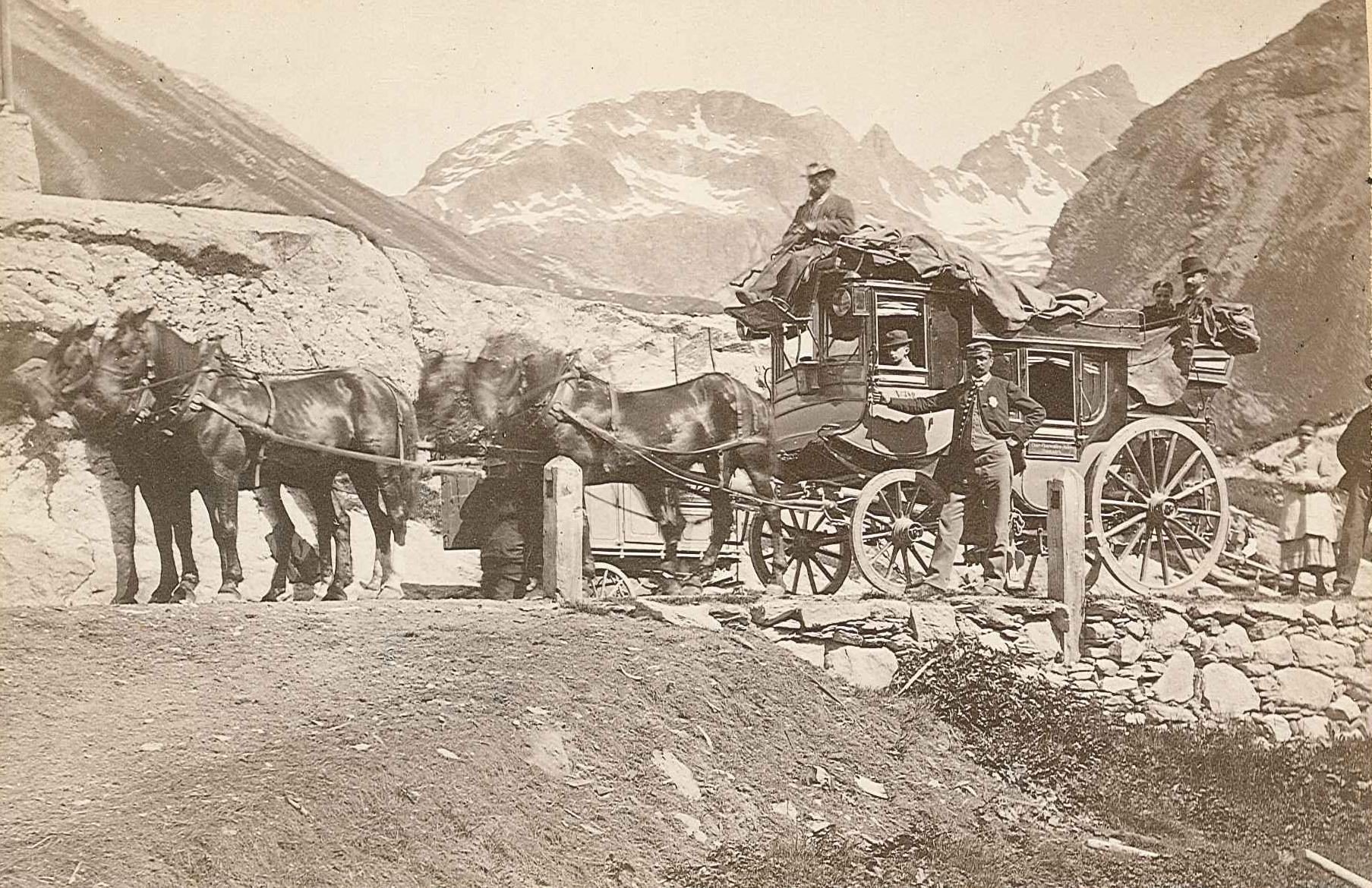
Stagecoach on the Julier road, before 1882

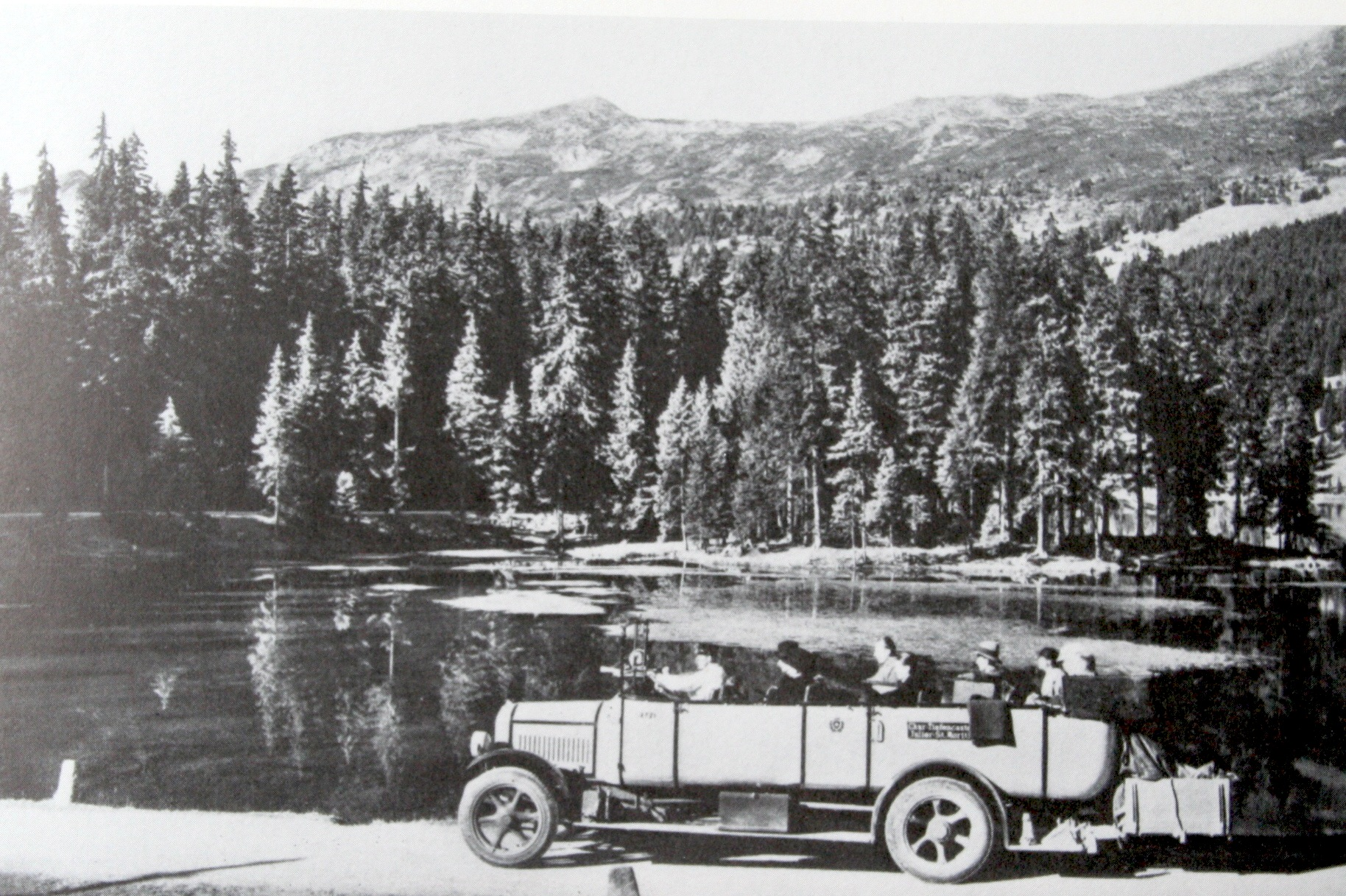
Post bus, 1920

=== The postal chauffeur ===
Until the first attempts with motor buses in 1906, the PTT used horse-drawn carriages throughout Switzerland to transport passengers. The first postal bus lines were Bern-Detligen and Bern-Papiermühle-Bolligen. The Postauto could only definitively establish itself in the interwar period. In the 1950s, there were 400 postal chauffeurs at the PTT, whose main task was to drive the postal buses used for passenger transport. Applicants between 22 and 28 years old were admitted at that time, who reached a minimum height of 165 cm and were considered militarily fit. The chauffeur was also responsible for the maintenance of the vehicle. Especially trained auto mechanics and vehicle locksmiths were suitable for the profession as postal chauffeur. Furthermore, it was required that the drivers already had at least one year of practice in driving heavy trucks. After passing the examination, a year of probation followed. After another two years and a subsequent examination, the chauffeur advanced to wagon leader-mechanic. In addition, there was also the possibility to further train as garage chief or master.

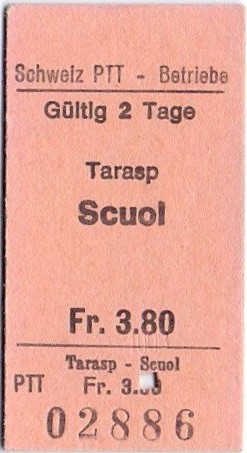
Typical PTT ticket from the 1960s, here from Tarasp to Scuol

==== Special assignment in Berlin during the Second World War ====
During the Second World War, Switzerland represented the interests of various states as a diplomatic protecting power. PTT civil servants were active as (postal) wagon leaders, chauffeurs and mechanics for the Automobile Service of the Swiss Legation, Department for Protecting Power Affairs in Germany.

Due to the increased need for vehicles and skilled operating personnel, the Department for Foreign Interests in Bern hired additional (postal) wagon leaders, chauffeurs and mechanics as a result of the increase in protecting power mandates taken over by Switzerland. The PTT General Directorate in Bern dispatched several persons who took up their position at the automobile service of the Swiss delegation in Berlin in a period from February 1944 to January 1945. At the beginning of February 1945, 12 people worked in the legation alone for the automobile service.

A mention of the automobile service in the specialist literature is rare. Paul Widmer describes it implicitly: "The much larger staff of the protecting power department occupied accommodations that were 50 to 100 kilometers outside Berlin. Uniformed PTT chauffeurs, who so to speak fulfilled their military active service on German soil, drove the legation personnel back and forth. They were also available to the staff of the protecting power department, who had quartered themselves in Wutike, Blumenow, Bantikow and in five other villages of the Mark Brandenburg."

As the main task, the automobile service ensured contact between the offices of the Swiss representations in Germany. It proved indispensable precisely in this, especially since telephone connections often failed as a result of the day and night attacks by allied bomber formations. In addition, the service ensured the supply of food and spare parts, the procurement of which was difficult as a result of the German war economy. The garage chief of the automobile service explained in his activity report of November 20, 1945, exemplarily how the responsible persons of the automobile service circumvented the spare parts shortage by collecting light metal remnants of shot down "Flying Fortresses" (B-17). To a greater extent, the service took over the transport of Swiss employees for service and vacation trips between Bern and Berlin, since the direct train connection between Switzerland and Germany was frequently interrupted in the winter months of 1944 and 1945 after the bombing of the railway infrastructure.

The monthly camp inspections of the interned civilians of the states at war with Germany, the detained diplomatic personnel and the prisoners of war by representatives of the Swiss delegation belonged to the extended area of responsibility of the Department for Protecting Power Affairs. Inspections of concentration camps were prohibited by the German Foreign Ministry to the Swiss legation personnel with reference to "internal political matters", which were outside the scope of the Geneva Prisoner of War Conventions of 1929. Despite the beginning offensive on Berlin by the Red Army, the Swiss delegation continued the trips to the internees in increased numbers in February and March 1945 (until the end of the war). In these two months, the chauffeurs of the automobile service covered the greatest mileage with 40,174 km respectively 41,659 km with a monthly average performance of about 22,555 km.

The intensification of the war events around Berlin led in the spring of 1945 to the evacuation of the automobile service from Herzberg via Grosswudicke (northwest of Berlin) to Kisslegg in Upper Swabia. In October 1945, the last relocation from Kisslegg to Bad Homburg vor der Höhe near Frankfurt am Main followed.

After the unconditional surrender of Germany on May 8, 1945, the Swiss department for protecting power affairs in Germany with the associated automobile service of the Swiss legation dissolved.

=== The telegraphist ===
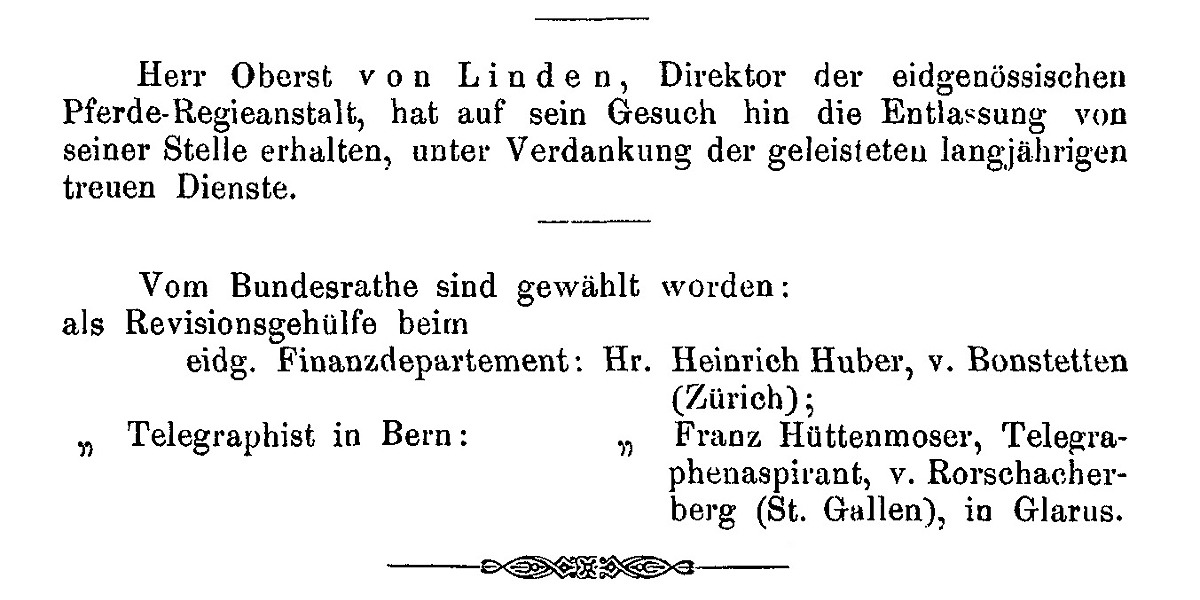
Election of a telegraphist by the Federal Council, 1887

The main task of the telegraphist was to transmit telegrams. The correspondence was mostly composed with code words. The distribution, booking and billing of the telegrams also belonged to the tasks. Due to the rapidly increasing telephone traffic from the end of the First World War, the telegraph slowly lost importance, whereby fewer telegraphists were needed. Knowledge of various languages was a prerequisite for practicing the profession. In addition, the telegraphist also had to be able to fix technical malfunctions. In the 1950s, he could transfer to the administrative service of the telephone directorate after five years, including the apprenticeship. The post offices and banks were connected to the telegraph office by pneumatic tube systems. There, various stations indicated the arrival of shipments with signal lamps. In addition, from the late 1930s, teletypewriters were used, which resembled a typewriter externally. With these teletypes, the telegraphists no longer had to write the messages with Morse code, but could use letters directly. The transmission method of the telegram was chosen by the recipient. It could be transmitted by telephone, by pneumatic tube, by runner, or by teletypewriter.

=== The telephone operator ===
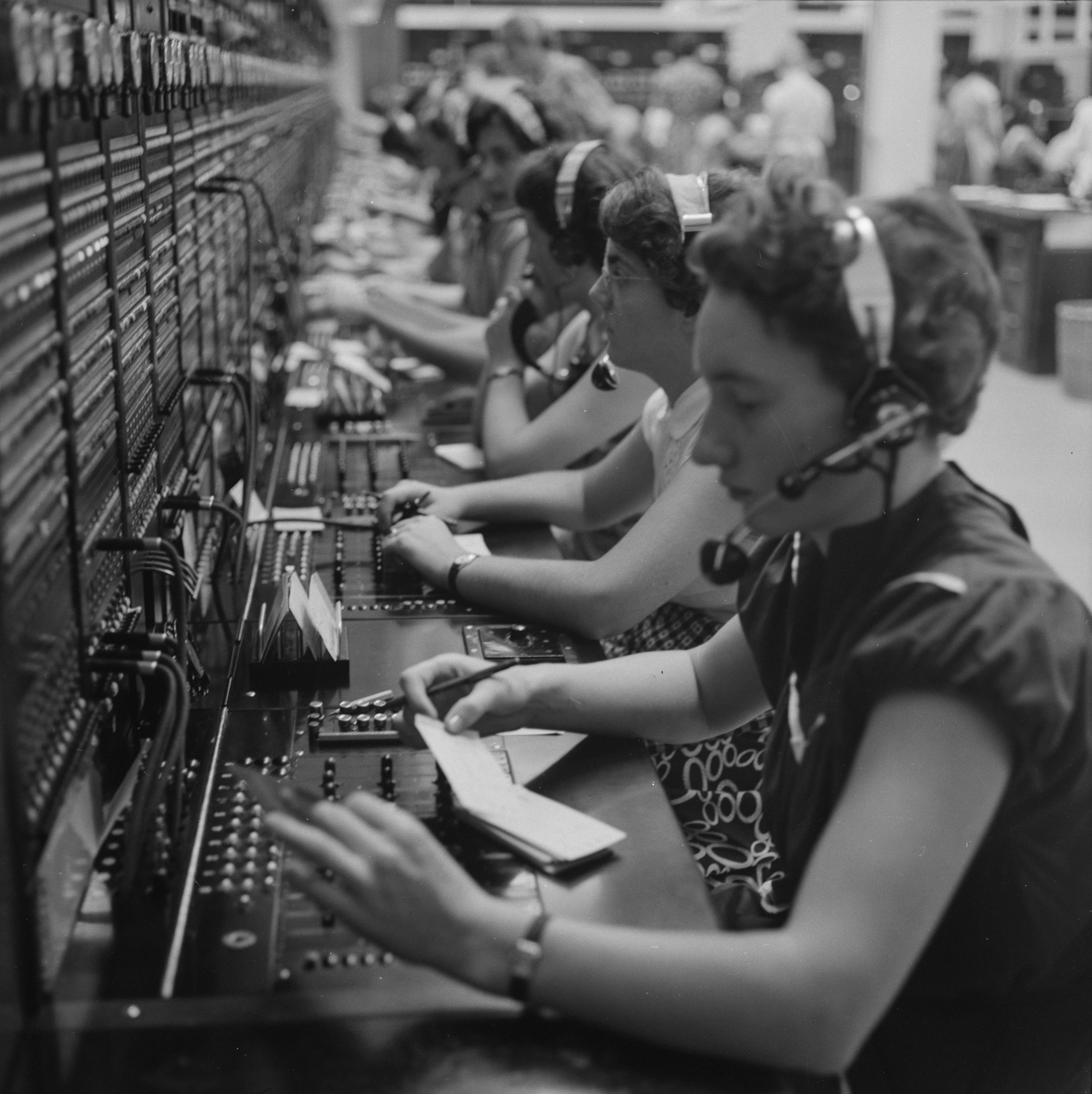
Telephone operators 1955

The main task of the telephone operator was to manually establish telephone connections in the telephone exchanges before telephony was automated nationwide from the mid-20th century. Since the commissioning of the first Swiss telephone networks in the 1880s, the telephone directorates employed exclusively women as workers in the telephone exchanges. There was never a public decision that would have prohibited men from working in the switching service, but the telephone administration was of the opinion that the higher women's voices were better understandable on the telephone. Furthermore, the female gender was attributed more gentleness and patience in dealing with customers. Not least, female workers were cheaper at that time, which the TT Directorate certainly considered in its deliberations. Compared to all employees of the telephone and telegraph administration, the telephone operators were at the bottom end of the wage scale. Admitted to the entrance examination as a telephone operator around 1940 were applicants who were between 17 and 20 years old and possessed knowledge of a second official language. The work in the telephone exchanges was very demanding. The workers had to work quickly in a noisy environment and were supervised by a supervisor. They had to be always friendly and courteous towards the telephone subscribers. The telephone operators were also subject to official secrecy. They were strictly forbidden to give third parties information about calls made. In case of disregard of the telephone secrecy, lighter cases were followed by termination, while serious violations were punished with prison sentences.

=== Staff numbers ===
Year	PTT	thereof Post	thereof Telecom
1950	ca. 30,000	...	...
1970	47,433	...	...
1975	50,791	...	...
1980	51,592	...	...
1985	56,991	...	...
1990	63,654	...	...
1995	59,635	38,524	20,143
1996	59,661	38,008	21,204
1997	58,431	36,880	21,457

== Key figures ==
=== Revenue ===
Year	Amount
1938	147 million
1948	267 million

=== Transport performance ===
Year	Addressed letter post	Shipments without address	Newspapers	Packages
1970	1756	257	1113	128
1975	1821	227	1042	132
1980	2067	487	1138	150
1985	2458	620	1165	186
1990	2998	789	1200	224
1995	3160	970	1137	199
1996 (Note: From 1996 onwards, there were new criteria for letter and parcel delivery.)	3196	1048	1106	159
1997	3231	1165	1070	153
All numbers are to be multiplied by 10,000

=== Telecommunications services ===
==== Telephone ====
Year	Main connections in 1000	Natel connections in 1000	Local calls in millions	Long-distance calls, in millions tax minutes	International calls in millions tax minutes
1970	1945	–	988	3210	287
1975	2462	–	1080	3658	506
1980	2839	4	1209	4592	885
1985	3277	9	1408	5895	1361
1990	3943	134	1663	8556	2380
1995	4318	447	1890	8567	3199
1996	4547	663	1898	8957	3454
1997	...	1044	...	...	...

==== Teleinformatics ====
Year	Telefax (Note: Participants registered in the PTT Telefax Directory)	Telex subscriptions in 1000	Telex traffic in millions tax minutes
1970	–	13	80
1975	–	22	123
1980	–	31	173
1985	5	39	240
1990	83	24	133
1995	197	8	47
1996	207	7	39
1997	...	...	...

== Research and archive ==
The files and library holdings of the former PTT enterprises are managed by the PTT Archive. Since 2014, the PTT Archive has also operated an Oral History Archive. To this end, about 10 to 15 former PTT employees are interviewed annually, with the aim of documenting the change in the company.

== Literature ==
- Ernest Bonjour: Die Geschichte der Schweizerischen Post. PTT General Directorate, Bern 1949.
- Karl Kronig (ed.): Ab die Post. 150 Jahre schweizerische Post. Museum für Kommunikation, Bern 1999, ISBN 3-905111-40-3.
- Arthur Wyss: Die Post in der Schweiz. Ihre Geschichte durch 2000 Jahre. Hallwag-Verlag, Bern/Stuttgart 1987, ISBN 3-444-10335-2.
- Yvonne Bühlmann, Kathrin Zatti: Frauen im schweizerischen Telegrafen- und Telefonwesen, 1870–1914. Chronos-Verlag, Zürich 1992, ISBN 3-905278-96-0.
- Helmut Gold (ed.), Annette Koch (ed.), Rolf Barnekow (contributions): Fräulein vom Amt. Prestel-Verlag, Munich 1993, ISBN 3-7913-1270-7.
- General Directorate PTT (ed.): 100 Jahre elektrisches Nachrichtenwesen in der Schweiz, 1852–1952, Volume 3. Bern 1962.
- Berufe der PTT. In: Städtische Berufsberatung Zürich (ed.): Aufklärungsschrift für die Schüler der 2. und 3. Sekundarklasse und den übrigen Abschlussklassen. No. 29. Zurich 1953, pp. 55–56.
- Oskar Hauser: Der Telegraphist. In: Robert Bratschi (ed.): Mein Dienst, mein Stolz. Basel 1941, pp. 140–141.
- Köniz. In: PTT Archive P-507, Reports on the Deployment of PTT Wagon Leaders in Berlin during the Second World War, 2017.
