= Canton of Bellinzona =

Canton of the Helvetic Republic

Coordinates: 46°12′N 9°1′E

Canton of Bellinzona Cantone Bellinzona
- Canton of the Helvetic Republic
- 1798–1803
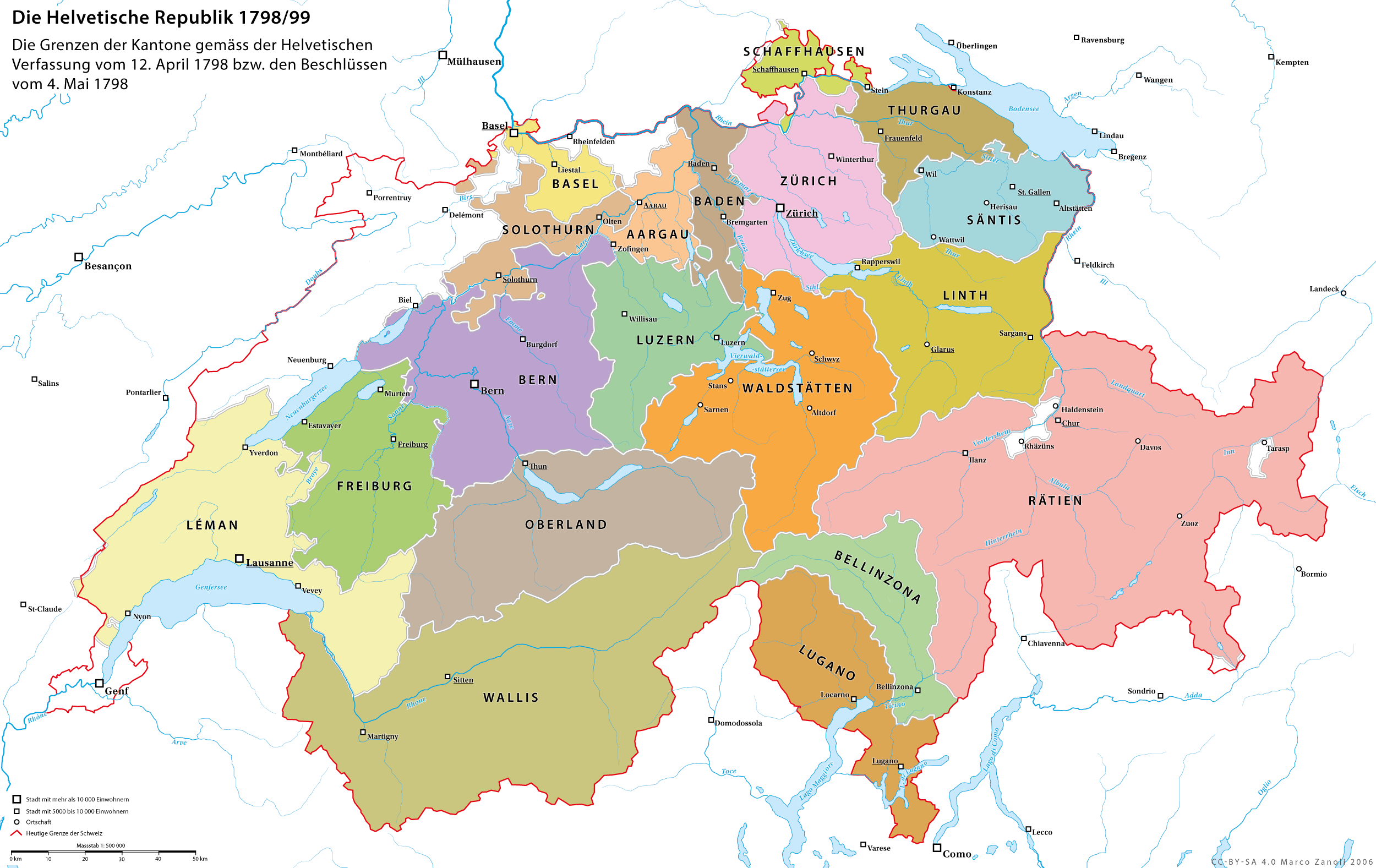
- The Helvetic Republic, as at the constitution of 12 April 1798, showing the canton of Bellinzona in green, lower-centre. Lugano is shown adjacent, in orange-brown.
- Capital: Bellinzona
- History
  - Helv. Rep. proclaimed: April 12, 1798
  - Canton established: 14 April 1798
  - Act of Mediation, merged with Lugano: 19 February 1803
Preceded by
Vogtei of Bellinzona	Vogtei of Bellinzona
Vogtei of Blenio	Vogtei of Blenio
Vogtei of Leventina	Vogtei of Leventina
Vogtei of Rivera	Vogtei of Rivera
Succeeded by
Ticino	Ticino

Bellinzona was the name of a canton of the Helvetic Republic, with its capital in Bellinzona.

The canton was founded in 1798 with the slogan Liberi e svizzeri (Italian for Freemen and Swiss) as a means of remaining a part of Switzerland, rather than being annexed to the Cisalpine client republic. The canton was made up of the four Landvogteien of Bellinzona, Blenio, Leventina and Rivera.

The autonomy enjoyed by Bellinzona was quite limited, as the canton was exposed to both external intervention and pressure from the warring parties north of the Alps. Within days of the cantons' founding, the Swiss Grand Council proposed merging Bellinzona with Lugano; in order not to provoke local conflicts, however, the measure was rapidly reversed. Another abortive attempt was made, by the two cantons in question this time, to investigate a union between them in 1801 but, again, no agreement could be reached.

The cantonal government was headed by Giuseppe Antonio Rusca, a representative of the central government, equipped with broad powers; he was replaced by Giacomo Antonio Sacchi in October 1801. To the central government, the canton sent two senators and eight representatives to the Grand Council.

The new political system was very unpopular with the citizens of the canton; mainly due to the imposition of direct taxation and mandatory military service, as well as the dismantling of political structures of the Old Swiss Confederacy and the anti-clerical measures imposed by Napoleon's revolutionary forces. The struggles in the Republic between the Unitaires and the Federalists caused anti-French unrest to break out in the Leventina — the most northerly part of the canton — in 1799, which led to secessionist moves, with many in the area wanting to join with nearby Uri, then within the Helvetic canton of Waldstätten.

As was the case with Lugano, the canton suffered particularly from the opposing troops — French, Austrian, and Russian — marching through the region, requiring accommodation and requisition of property, causing the two cantons to become increasingly alienated from the rest of Switzerland.

With Napoleon's Act of Mediation abolishing the Helvetic Republic and restoring the sovereignty of the cantons, the merger with Lugano was finally effected, creating the Ticino.
