= List of German films of the 1980s =

This is a list of the most notable films produced in Cinema of Germany in the 1980s.

For an alphabetical list of articles on West German films see Category:West German films.

== 1980 ==
Title	Director	Cast	Genre	Notes
Ab mit dir ins Vaterland	Horst Flick	Patrick Martin, Witta Pohl, Manfred Günther, Tilli Breidenbach, Wolfgang Büttner	Drama	
Ein Abend mit Labiche	Dieter Wedel	Jörg Pleva, Hannelore Elsner, Gertraud Jesserer, Heidemarie Hatheyer, Gerd Baltus, Barbara Valentin	Comedy, Anthology, Musical	
As Far as the Eye Sees	Erwin Keusch	Bernd Tauber, Aurore Clément, Jürgen Prochnow, Hans-Michael Rehberg, Werner Kreindl	Thriller	
Asphalt Night	Peter Fratzscher	Gerd Udo Heinemann, Thomas Davis, Petra Jokisch	Music	
Auf halbem Weg	Dagmar Damek	Wolf Roth, Marie Colbin	Drama	
Der Aufstieg – Ein Mann geht verloren	Peter Patzak	Ernst Schröder	Drama	
Aus heiterem Himmel	Wolfgang Panzer	Peter Ehrlich, Renate Schroeter, Ernst Hannawald, Ernst Stankovski	Thriller	a.k.a. The Childkeeper
Barefoot in the Park	Arno Assmann	Anita Lochner, Helmut Förnbacher, Wolfgang Kieling	Comedy	
Die Beförderung	Rolf Busch	Walter Spiske, Marie-Luise Marjan, Suzanne von Borsody, Diether Krebs	Drama	
Berlin Alexanderplatz	Rainer Werner Fassbinder	Günter Lamprecht, Barbara Sukowa, Gottfried John, Hanna Schygulla, Elisabeth Trissenaar, Ivan Desny	Drama	TV miniseries
Berlin Chamissoplatz	Rudolf Thome	Hanns Zischler, Sabine Bach	Drama	
Berlin Mitte	Peter Beauvais	Ute Christensen, Kristina van Eyck, Rüdiger Kirschstein, Peter Seum	Drama	
Big and Little	Peter Stein	Edith Clever	Drama	a.k.a. Big and Small
The Boxer	Karl Fruchtmann	Norbert Kappen, Donata Höffer, Vérénice Rudolph, Stefan Wigger, Hans Putz	Drama	
The Candidate	Volker Schlöndorff, Alexander Kluge, Stefan Aust, Alexander von Eschwege		Documentary	Entered into the 1980 Cannes Film Festival
Car-napping	Wigbert Wicker	Bernd Stephan, Anny Duperey, Ivan Desny, Adrian Hoven, Michel Galabru, Eddie Constantine, Adolfo Celi	Crime comedy	
The Cause of the Crime	Michael Verhoeven	Otto Sander, Hannes Messemer	Drama	a.k.a. Die Ursache
Céleste	Percy Adlon	Eva Mattes, Jürgen Arndt	Biography	
Daniel	George Moorse	Dieter Kirchlechner, Beatrice Kessler, Ian Moorse	Drama	
Dead Men on Leave	Walter Davy	Michael Schottenberg	War	a.k.a. Tote auf Urlaub. Austrian-West German co-production
Death Watch	Bertrand Tavernier	Harvey Keitel, Romy Schneider, Harry Dean Stanton, Max von Sydow, Vadim Glowna, Bernhard Wicki	Science fiction	French-West German co-production
Defekte	Diethard Klante	Klaus Knuth, Harald Dietl, Hannelore Hoger	Crime	
Diabolo	Nathan Jariv	Liane Hielscher, Petra Maria Grühn, Andreas Seyferth, Günther Ungeheuer	Comedy	a.k.a. Que le diable l'emporte
Divorce Me, Darling	Imo Moszkowicz	Nadja Tiller, Walter Giller, Barbara Schöne, Elisabeth Volkmann, Ralf Wolter	Comedy	a.k.a. Liebling, ich lass' mich scheiden!
The Dream House	Ulrich Schamoni	Horst Frank, Judy Winter, Leslie Malton, Jochen Schroeder	Comedy	
Egon Schiele	John Goldschmidt	Felix Mitterer	Biography	Austrian-West German co-production
Egon Schiele – Exzess und Bestrafung	Herbert Vesely	Mathieu Carrière, Jane Birkin, Christine Kaufmann, Kristina van Eyck, Karina Fallenstein, Marcel Ophuls	Biography	a.k.a. Egon Schiele: Excess and Punishment. Austrian-French-West German co-production
Das eine Glück und das andere	Axel Corti	Suzanne von Borsody, Peter Simonischek, Hans Brenner	Drama	Austrian-West German co-production
Ehe der Hahn kräht	Vojtěch Jasný	Sigfrit Steiner, Gerd Böckmann, Veronika Fitz, Arno Assmann	War	
Eingriffe	Thomas Fantl	Judy Winter, Jürgen Thormann, Karin Eickelbaum	Drama	
Einmal hunderttausend Taler	Wolfgang Spier	Herbert Herrmann, Barbara Schöne, Simone Rethel, Günter Pfitzmann, Ralf Wolter, Wolfgang Völz	Musical	a.k.a. Einmal 100000 Taler
L'Empreinte des géants	Robert Enrico	Mario Adorf, Raimund Harmstorf, Serge Reggiani, Andréa Ferréol	Drama	French-West German co-production
Enter Laughing	Ralf Gregan	Ilja Richter, Inge Meysel, Curt Bois	Comedy	a.k.a. Bühne frei für Kolowitz
Exit... nur keine Panik	Franz Novotny	Hanno Pöschl, Isolde Barth, Paulus Manker, Eddie Constantine	Crime comedy	a.k.a. Exit... But No Panic. Austrian-West German co-production
Exit Sunset Boulevard	Bastian Clevé	Elke Sommer, Rüdiger Kuhlbrodt, Azizi Johari	Drama	
Fabian	Wolf Gremm	Hans Peter Hallwachs, Silvia Janisch, Ivan Desny, Hermann Lause, Brigitte Mira, Charles Régnier	Drama	
Der Fall Walrawe	Werner Schlechte	Werner Kreindl	History	a.k.a. Der Fall Walrave
Der falsche Paß für Tibo	Stephan Rinser	Hansi Kraus, Michaela May, Franz Xaver Kroetz	Drama	a.k.a. Der falsche Pass für Tibo
A Flea in Her Ear	Sigi Rothemund	Horst Bollmann, Loni von Friedl, Evelyn Hamann, Günter Strack	Comedy	a.k.a. Der Floh im Ohr
Flitterwochen	Klaus Lemke	Cleo Kretschmer, Wolfgang Fierek	Comedy	
The Formula	John G. Avildsen	George C. Scott, Marlon Brando, Marthe Keller, John Gielgud, Wolfgang Preiss, Ferdy Mayne, Dieter Schidor, Werner Kreindl, Reinhard Kolldehoff, Jan Niklas	Thriller	American-West German co-production
Franz – Der leise Weg	Josef Rödl	Josef Schiessl	Drama	
Franzmann	Roland Emmerich, Ossie von Richthofen	Axel Behrend	Drama	
From the Life of the Marionettes	Ingmar Bergman	Robert Atzorn, Christine Buchegger, Martin Benrath, Heinz Bennent	Drama	Swedish-West German co-production
The Frozen Heart	Xavier Koller	Sigfrit Steiner, Günter Lamprecht, Emilia Krakowska, Paul Bühlmann, Giovanni Früh, Volker Prechtel	Drama	Swiss-Austrian-West German co-production
Geburt der Hexe	Wilfried Minks	Ulla Berkéwicz	Horror	West German-Swiss co-production
Germany, Pale Mother	Helma Sanders-Brahms	Eva Mattes, Ernst Jacobi	Drama, War	Entered into the 30th Berlin International Film Festival
Gibbi Westgermany	Christel Buschmann	Jörg Pfennigwerth, Eva-Maria Hagen	Drama	
Girls	Just Jaeckin	Anne Parillaud, Zoé Chauveau, Charlotte Walior	Drama	French-West German-Canadian co-production
Glaube, Liebe, Hoffnung	Michael Kehlmann	Gertraud Jesserer, Günther Maria Halmer	Drama	a.k.a. Faith, Hope and Charity
Grabbe's Last Summer	Sohrab Shahid-Saless	Wilfried Grimpe	Biography	
Die Gräfin vom Chamissoplatz	Sigi Rothemund	Cornelia Meinhardt, Rainer Hunold, Diether Krebs, Tatjana Blacher, Wolfgang Ziffer, Brigitte Grothum	Comedy	
The Green Bird	István Szabó	Hannelore Elsner, Péter Andorai, Krystyna Janda	Drama	
Grenzfälle	Imo Moszkowicz	Eva Renzi, Klaus Schwarzkopf, Dieter Schidor	Drama	
Grüße aus Bad Walden	Gerd Oelschlegel	Jürgen Goslar, Franziska Bronnen, Rosemarie Fendel	Crime	
A Guru Comes	Rainer Erler	Wolfgang Reichmann, Eric P. Caspar, Jörg Pleva, Wolfgang Kieling	Comedy	a.k.a. Here Comes the Guru
Georg Friedrich Händels Auferstehung	Klaus Lindemann	Heinrich Schweiger	Music, Biography	a.k.a. Händels Auferstehung a.k.a. The Lord Gave the Word
Hay Fever	Rolf von Sydow	Lilli Palmer, Hannelore Elsner, Peter Pasetti, Herbert Herrmann, Michaela May, Reiner Schöne, Christian Wolff	Comedy	a.k.a. Weekend
Heimat	Franz Xaver Kroetz	Willy Harlander, Lisa Fitz	Drama	
Henry Angst	Ingo Kratisch	Klaus Hoffmann, Daphne Moore, Rüdiger Vogler, Hanns Zischler	Drama	
Herkulespillen	Michael Günther	Siegfried W. Kernen, Gaby Gasser, Gerhard Olschewski	Comedy	a.k.a. Les Dragées d'Hercule
Herr Kischott	Percy Adlon	Rolf Illig	Comedy	a.k.a. Herr Kischott – Ein Traumspiel aus unseren Tagen
Das Hochhaus	Thomas Hartwig	Witta Pohl, Christian Brückner, Oliver Rohrbeck, Julia Biedermann	Drama	
Das höchste Gut einer Frau ist ihr Schweigen	Gertrud Pinkus	Maria Tucci-Lagamba	Docudrama	a.k.a. Il valore della donna è il suo silenzio. Swiss-West German co-production
Hollywood, ich komme	Ralf Gregan	Ilja Richter, Heidi Brühl, Zsa Zsa Gabor	Musical comedy	
The Hunger Years: In a Land of Plenty	Jutta Brückner	Sylvia Ulrich, Britta Pohland	Drama	
The Ideas of Saint Clara	Vojtěch Jasný	Katharina Böhm	Comedy	
In Prag und anderswo	Fritz Umgelter	Werner Kreindl, Karin Baal, Katerina Jacob	Biography, Comedy	
Intrigue and Love	Heinz Schirk	Jan Niklas, Dietlinde Turban, Klausjürgen Wussow, Thekla Carola Wied	Drama	a.k.a. Kabale und Liebe
Der Jähzornige	Hajo Gies	Tilo Prückner, Herlinde Latzko, Liane Hielscher, Ingeborg Lapsien	Drama	a.k.a. From the Diary of a Violent-tempered Man
Johann Sebastian Bach's Futile Journey to Fame	Victor Vicas	Alexander May	Biography, Music	West German-East German co-production
Joseph Roth – Ein Leben in Legenden	Georg Madeja	Georg Trenkwitz, Mijou Kovacs	Biography	Austrian-West German co-production
Die Judenbuche	Rainer Horbelt	Roland Teubner, Harry Raymon, Diether Krebs, Christiane Lemm	Drama	a.k.a. The Jew's Beech
Die Jungfernfahrt der "Antje B."	Eberhard Pieper	Heinz Meier, Eva-Maria Hagen, Gerhard Olschewski, Hans Helmut Dickow	Drama	
Kaiserhofstraße 12	Rainer Wolffhardt	Christoph Eichhorn, Doris Schade, Sigfrit Steiner, Monika Baumgartner	War, Drama	
Das Karnickel	George Moorse	Louise Martini, Uwe Friedrichsen, Andreas Seyferth, Jürgen Schmidt	Comedy	
Karriere zu zweit	Karl Heinz Deickert	Gila von Weitershausen, Hans-Jörg Assmann	Comedy	
Katharina und Potemkin	Ekkehard Böhmer	Anneliese Rothenberger, Klaus Wildbolz, Ivan Rebroff	Musical	
Kein Geld für einen Toten	Lutz Büscher	Paul Dahlke, Karin Eickelbaum, Reiner Schöne, Ivan Desny, Hannelore Schroth	Crime	
Keiner hat das Pferd geküßt	Martin Müller	Wolfgang Fierek, Christine Zierl, Bea Fiedler, Eddi Arent	Comedy	a.k.a. Keiner hat das Pferd geküsst
Die Kinder aus Nr. 67	Usch Barthelmeß-Weller, Werner Meyer	Bernd Riedel, René Schaaf	Drama	a.k.a. Die Kinder aus Nr. 67 oder Heil Hitler, ich hätt' gern 'n paar Pferdeäppel
The Kingfisher	Axel von Ambesser	Axel von Ambesser, Alice Treff, Karl Schönböck	Comedy	a.k.a. Der Eisvogel
Die kleine Figur meines Vaters	Wolfgang Glück	Ludwig Hirsch, Rudolf Wessely	Drama	Austrian-Hungarian-West German co-production
Kolportage	Peter Weck	Klausjürgen Wussow, Christiane Hörbiger, Georg Thomalla, Sascha Hehn, Sissy Höfferer	Comedy	
Konzert im 7. Stock	Hilde Bechert	Miguel Herz-Kestranek, Gila von Weitershausen, Hartmut Becker	Drama	
Land, das meine Sprache spricht	Michael Kehlmann	Dagmar Mettler, Volkert Kraeft, Guido Wieland, Günter Mack, Gert Haucke	Drama, War	Austrian-West German co-production
Ländliche Idylle	Hans-Jürgen Tögel	Paul Dahlke, Karin Eickelbaum, Marianne Hoppe, Gerd Baltus, Reiner Schöne, Hannelore Schroth	Drama	
Der lästige Ungar	Peter Weck	Willy Harlander, Rosemarie Fendel	Comedy	a.k.a. Der lästige Ungar oder Rigoletto hat keine Pause
Laufen lernen	Jutta Brückner	Sylvia Ulrich, Rita Rischak, Eberhard Feik	Drama	
Lightning Over Water	Wim Wenders	Nicholas Ray	Documentary	a.k.a. Nick's Film. West German-Swedish co-production
The Longest Second	Kristian Kühn	Armin Mueller-Stahl, Christine Ostermayer, Kristina van Eyck, Hans Korte, Ivan Desny	Thriller	
Luftwaffenhelfer	Volker Vogeler	Till Topf, Christoph Eichhorn, Alexander Radszun, Arthur Brauss	War	
Lulu	Walerian Borowczyk	Anne Bennent, Michele Placido, Heinz Bennent, Udo Kier	Drama	French-West German-Italian co-production
Mal raus aus dem Alltag	Fritz Umgelter	Ursela Monn, Herbert Herrmann, Georges Claisse, Evelyn Opela, Heinz Reincke, Michaela May, Günther Maria Halmer	Comedy	a.k.a. Das kommt davon, wenn man verreist
The Man Who Went Up in Smoke	Péter Bacsó	Derek Jacobi, Judy Winter	Crime	a.k.a. Der Mann, der sich in Luft auflöste. West German-Swedish-Hungarian co-production
Ein Mann fürs Leben	Erwin Keusch	Manfred Krug, Hannelore Hoger, Gerhard Olschewski	Drama	
Ein Mann von gestern	Tom Toelle	Will Quadflieg, Michael Degen, Gustav Rudolf Sellner, Gert Westphal, Witta Pohl	Drama	
Meine Seele ist eine leidenschaftliche Tänzerin	Jochen Richter	Anne Bennent, Isolde Barth	Biography	a.k.a. Meine Seele ist eine leidenschaftliche Tänzerin - Bettina von Arnim
Meister Timpe	Hartmut Griesmayr	Hans Christian Blech, Hans-Georg Panczak	Drama	
Menschenfrauen	Valie Export	Renée Felden, Maria Martina, Susanne Widl, Klaus Wildbolz	Drama	Austrian-West German co-production
The Moon Shines on Kylenamoe	Jan Kauenhowen	Otto Sander, Curt Bois	Comedy	
Mona und Marilyn	Sven Severin	Juliet Berto, Wolf Roth, Branko Samarovski	Drama	
Mosch	Tankred Dorst	Marius Müller-Westernhagen, Katharina Thalbach, Walter Taub, Herbert Grönemeyer	Drama	
Musik auf dem Lande	Oliver Storz	Harald Leipnitz, Andrea L'Arronge, Hans-Georg Panczak	Comedy	
On Southern Slopes	Michael Verhoeven	Helmut Zierl, Andrea Jonasson	Drama	a.k.a. Am Südhang
Order	Sohrab Shahid-Saless	Heinz Lieven	Drama	a.k.a. Ordnung
Palermo or Wolfsburg	Werner Schroeter	Nicola Zarbo, Otto Sander, Ida Di Benedetto	Drama	West German-Swiss co-production. Won the Golden Bear at Berlin
Panic Time	Udo Lindenberg, Peter Fratzscher	Udo Lindenberg, Leata Galloway, Walter Kohut, Vera Tschechowa, Hark Bohm, Eddie Constantine	Musical comedy	
Die Paulskirche	Carlheinz Caspari	Hannes Messemer, Reinhard Kolldehoff, Peter Ehrlich	History	a.k.a. Trilogie 1848: Die Paulskirche
Plastikfieber	Helmut Wietz	Romy Haag, Otto Sander	Comedy	
Der Preis fürs Überleben	Hans Noever	Michel Piccoli, Martin West, Ben Dova	Political thriller	a.k.a. The Price of Survival. Entered into the 30th Berlin International Film Festival
Private Lives	Dieter Wieland	Sonja Ziemann, Harald Leipnitz, Michael Hinz, Beatrice Richter	Comedy	a.k.a. Intimitäten
Purity of Heart	Robert van Ackeren	Elisabeth Trissenaar, Matthias Habich, Heinrich Giskes	Drama	
Put on Ice	Bernhard Sinkel	Helmut Griem, Martin Benrath, Ángela Molina	Political thriller	Entered into the 1980 Cannes Film Festival
The Rainmaker	Ludwig Cremer	Götz George, Cornelia Froboess, Walter Richter, Günter Lamprecht, Rolf Becker, Jochen Schroeder	Comedy	
The Rebel	Stelvio Massi	Maurizio Merli, Jutta Speidel, Arthur Brauss, Reinhard Kolldehoff, Francisco Rabal	Crime thriller	Italian-West German co-production
Reiseabrechnung	Joachim Roering	Klaus Schwarzkopf, Gottfried John, Walter Buschhoff	Comedy	a.k.a. Reiseabrechnung – Die Geschichte einer Spende
Die Reventlow	Rainer Wolffhardt	Donata Höffer	Biography	a.k.a. Franziska Countess zu Reventlow
Rosina	Heide Pils	Christine Merthan	Drama	Austrian-West German co-production
Eine Rückkehr	Sławomir Mrożek	Joachim Bißmeier, Hannelore Hoger, Dieter Laser, Johanna Thimig, Walter Kohut	Drama	
Ruhestörung	Berengar Pfahl	Herbert Hausmann, Norbert Goth	Crime	
The Scenario	Wolfgang Liebeneiner	Wolfgang Kieling, Loni von Friedl, Volkert Kraeft	Drama	a.k.a. Das Drehbuch
Schaut her – und seht die Anmut meiner Hände	Carin Braun	Carin Braun, Josef Bierbichler	Drama	
Scheidung auf französisch	Wolfgang Spier	Karin Eickelbaum, Herbert Bötticher, Herbert Herrmann, Angelika Bender, Harry Wüstenhagen	Comedy	a.k.a. Divorce à la française
Schlagzeile	Dagmar Damek	Giovanni Früh, Marie Colbin	Drama	
Sierra Madre	Horst Flick	Charles Brauer, Christine Ostermayer, Ingeborg Schöner	Drama	
Signorina Mafalda	Herbert Brödl	Lorenzo Basso, Riccardo Cucciolla, Fiorenzo Fiorentini, Quinto Parmeggiani, Christiane Carstens	Drama	West German-Austrian co-production
Slow Attack	Reinhard Hauff	Burkhard Driest, Rolf Zacher, Katja Rupé	Drama	a.k.a. Endstation Freiheit
Star Without a Sky	Ottokar Runze	Uwe Drißler, Andreas Hameder, Hieronymus Blößer, Martin Fuchs	Drama, War	
Die Stimmen der Sylphiden	Helmut Rost	Martin Lüttge, Ingeborg Schöner	Science fiction	
Stückgut	Roland Schraut	Alfons Scharf	Drama	
Sunday Children	Michael Verhoeven	Nora Barner, Erika Pluhar	Drama	
Švabica	Rainer Wolffhardt	Frano Lasić, Regine Lamster	Drama	a.k.a. Die Deutsche. Yugoslav-West German co-production
Teegebäck und Platzpatronen	Wolfgang Spier	Brigitte Horney, Rudolf Platte, Charles Régnier	Crime comedy	a.k.a. The Robin Hood Caper
Theo Against the Rest of the World	Peter F. Bringmann	Marius Müller-Westernhagen, Guido Gagliardi, Claudia Demarmels	Road movie, Action comedy	
Der Thronfolger	Oswald Döpke	Jan Kollwitz, Günter Strack, Maria Schell, Jan Niklas, Dietlinde Turban, Siegfried Wischnewski	Biography, History	
Totally Frozen	Hans Noever	Rio Reiser, Silvia Janisch, Jürgen von Alten, Hanns Zischler	Black comedy	
Tränende Herzen	Berengar Pfahl	Ursula von Reibnitz	Drama	
Trauer um einen verlorenen Sohn	Thomas Engel	Bobby Prem, Petra Maria Grühn	Drama	a.k.a. Trauer um einen verlorenen Sohn – Szenisches Protokoll eines kurzes Lebens
... und raus bist du	Peter Schulze-Rohr	Elga Sorbas, Hans-Joachim Grubel, Dietrich Mattausch	Drama	
Under Lock and Key	Wilma Kottusch	Lisa Kreuzer, Jürgen Prochnow, Rudolf Schündler, Edith Schultze-Westrum, Vera Tschechowa, Michaela May	Drama	a.k.a. Unter Verschluß a.k.a. Unter Verschluss
The Ungrateful	Franz Josef Wild	Dietlinde Turban, Walter Kohut, Silvia Janisch	Drama	a.k.a. Die Undankbare
Ein unruhiger Sommer	Rüdiger Graf	Wolfgang Kieling, Elisabeth Wiedemann, Gisela Schneeberger	Comedy	
Der unwürdige Liebhaber	Ludwig Cremer	Karin Anselm, Jan Niklas, Wolf Roth, Cornelia Köndgen, Hartmut Reck, Hilde Lermann	Drama	
The Uprising	Peter Lilienthal	Augustin Pereira	Drama	West German-Costa Rican co-production
The Weavers	Fritz Umgelter	Klaus Maria Brandauer, Martin Lüttge, Karin Baal	Drama	
Weichselkirschen	Michael Günther, Gerard Zalewski	Luitgard Im, Stanisław Zaczyk, Franciszek Pieczka, Christine Merthan, Barbara Ludwiżanka, Aleksandra Śląska, Emilia Krakowska, Bolesław Płotnicki, Wiktor Grotowicz, Helena Dąbrowska	Drama	a.k.a. Wiśnie. West German-Polish co-production
Why the UFOs Steal Our Lettuce	Hansjürgen Pohland	Tommi Piper, Ursela Monn, Curd Jürgens, Hildegard Knef, Raimund Harmstorf, Günter Pfitzmann	Comedy, Science fiction	
The Woman from Sarajevo	Vojtěch Jasný	Heidelinde Weis, Rade Šerbedžija, Elfriede Kuzmany	Drama	a.k.a. Gospodjica a.k.a. Das Fräulein. Yugoslav-West German co-production
The Wonderful Years	Reiner Kunze	Gabi Marr, Martin May, Dietrich Mattausch, Christine Wodetzky, Rolf Boysen	Drama	
The World That Summer	Ilse Hofmann	Jan Schwarzbauer, Katrin Schaake, Hermann Lause, Grete Wurm, Christiane Carstens	Historical drama	
Das Ziel	Hartmut Griesmayr	Peter Sattmann	Drama	
Zwei oder Was sind das für Träume	Berengar Pfahl	Verena Plangger, Ursula von Reibnitz	Drama	

== 1981 ==
Title	Director	Cast	Genre	Notes
Ach du lieber Harry	Jean Girault	Dieter Hallervorden, Iris Berben	Comedy	
After Midnight	Wolf Gremm	Désirée Nosbusch, Nicole Heesters, Hermann Lause, Marion Kracht	Drama	
Alberta und Alice oder Die Unterwerfung	Wilm ten Haaf	Marianne Nentwich, Beatrice Kessler, Ida Ehre	Comedy	a.k.a. Alberta & Alice oder Die Unterwerfung
Amphitryon	Hans-Jürgen Tögel	Christian Kohlund, Thekla Carola Wied, Klaus Schwarzkopf, Christian Rode, Klaus Höhne	Comedy	
Angels of Iron	Thomas Brasch	Hilmar Thate, Ulrich Wesselmann, Katharina Thalbach, Karin Baal, Ilse Pagé	Crime drama	Entered into the 1981 Cannes Film Festival
Anima – Symphonie phantastique	Titus Leber	Mathieu Carrière, Charo López	Drama	Austrian-West German co-production
Auf Schusters Rappen	Manfred Seide	Joachim Tennstedt, Manfred Lehmann, Beate Jensen, Claudia Demarmels	Drama	
Der Aufsteiger	Bernd Fischerauer	Reiner Schöne, Alexandra Bogojevic, Werner Asam, Günter Strack	Drama	
Aus der Franzosenzeit	Dagmar Damek	Leon Niemczyk, Gojko Mitić, Ute Lubosch, Martin Hellberg, Peter Reusse, Gerry Wolff	Historical drama	West German-East German co-production
Die Baronin	Lutz Büscher	Marianne Hoppe, Iris Berben	Biography, Docudrama	a.k.a. Die Baronin – Fontane machte sie unsterblich a.k.a. Elisabeth von Ardenne
Bäume ausreißen	Maria Neocleous	Elisabeth Stepanek, Bernd Tauber	Comedy	
Berlin Tunnel 21	Richard Michaels	Richard Thomas, Horst Buchholz, José Ferrer	Drama	American-West German co-production
Birgitt Haas Must Be Killed	Laurent Heynemann	Philippe Noiret, Jean Rochefort, Lisa Kreuzer	Thriller	French-West German co-production
Blind Spot	Claudia von Alemann	Rebecca Pauly	Drama	a.k.a. Die Reise nach Lyon
Bloody Moon	Jesús Franco	Olivia Pascal, Christoph Moosbrugger, Alexander Waechter	Horror	
Das Boot	Wolfgang Petersen	Jürgen Prochnow, Herbert Grönemeyer, Klaus Wennemann, Martin Semmelrogge, Erwin Leder, Jan Fedder, Ralf Richter, Heinz Hoenig, Uwe Ochsenknecht, Otto Sander	War	a.k.a. The Boat. Based on a novel by Lothar-Günther Buchheim, Columbia Pictures
Burning Rubber	Norman Cohen	Bay City Rollers, Olivia Pascal, Sascha Hehn	Action	
Das Casanova-Projekt	F. K. Waechter, Bernd Eilert, Robert Gernhardt, Arend Agthe	Alfred Edel	Comedy	
Charlotte	Frans Weisz	Birgit Doll, Elisabeth Trissenaar, Brigitte Horney, Derek Jacobi, Patricia Hodge	Biography, War	Dutch-West German co-production
Children	Oswald Döpke	Lilli Palmer, Judy Winter, Jan Niklas, Cordula Trantow	Drama	
Christiane F.	Uli Edel	Natja Brunckhorst	Drama	
Circle of Deceit	Volker Schlöndorff	Bruno Ganz, Hanna Schygulla, Jerzy Skolimowski, Gila von Weitershausen	Drama, War	a.k.a. The Deception. West German-French co-production
Collin	Peter Schulze-Rohr	Curd Jürgens, Hans Christian Blech, Armin Mueller-Stahl, Margot Werner, Thekla Carola Wied, Hannes Messemer	Drama	
Comrades	Diethard Klante	Uwe Friedrichsen, Hilde Lermann	Comedy	
Confused Feelings	Étienne Périer	Michel Piccoli, Pierre Malet, Gila von Weitershausen	Drama	a.k.a. Confusion. French-West German co-production
Conversation at Night	Guy Kubli	Sigfrit Steiner, Charles Brauer	Drama	a.k.a. Conversation at Night with a Despised Character
The Curse of the Tarniffs	Hajo Gies	Rüdiger Vogler, Anne-Marie Kuster, Herlinde Latzko, Monica Gruber	Drama	a.k.a. Beate and Mareile
Day of the Idiots	Werner Schroeter	Carole Bouquet, Ingrid Caven, Christine Kaufmann	Psycho-fantasy drama	Entered into the 1982 Cannes Film Festival
Desperado City	Vadim Glowna	Siemen Rühaak, Beate Finckh, Vera Tschechowa, Karin Baal	Drama	
Don Quixote's Children	Claudia Holldack	Angelica Domröse, Dietrich Mattausch, Dieter Laser, Pola Kinski	Drama	
Double Trouble	Dorothea Neukirchen	Gudrun Landgrebe, Jochen Schroeder	Comedy	a.k.a. Dabbel Trabbel
Elisabeths Kind	Rainer Boldt	Roja Knüppel, Henning Grimm, Claudia Demarmels, Karl-Heinz von Hassel, Brigitte Janner	Drama	a.k.a. Elisabeth's Child
Das Ende vom Anfang	Christian Görlitz	Michael Fass	Drama	
Es bleibt in der Familie	Wolfgang Spier	Harald Juhnke, Simone Rethel, Edda Seippel	Comedy	a.k.a. Les Chantrel a.k.a. Les Trois Messieurs de Bois-Guillaume
Es geht seinen Gang oder Mühen in unserer Ebene	Günter Gräwert	Wolfgang Bathke, Helga Koehler, Barbara Stanek, Wilfried Klaus	Drama	
Etwas wird sichtbar	Harun Farocki	Anna Mandel, Marcel Werner, Hanns Zischler, Inga Humpe, Bruno Ganz, Elfriede Irrall	Drama	a.k.a. Before Your Eyes: Vietnam
Die Fahrt nach Schlangenbad	Stanislav Barabáš	Willi Kowalj, Friedrich-Karl Praetorius, Heinz Moog, Anja Kruse, Franziska Bronnen, Kurt Raab	Drama	
Der Fall Woyzeck	Oswald Döpke	Jörg Hube, Rosemarie Fendel, Katerina Jacob, Edith Heerdegen, Günter Strack, Klaus Schwarzkopf	Docudrama	
Fantasma d'amore	Dino Risi	Marcello Mastroianni, Romy Schneider, Wolfgang Preiss, Eva Maria Meineke	Drama, Fantasy	a.k.a. Ghost of Love. Italian-French-West German co-production
Fear Not, Jacob!	Radu Gabrea	André Heller	Drama	a.k.a. Don't Be Afraid, Jacob
La Ferdinanda: Sonate für eine Medici-Villa	Rebecca Horn	Valentina Cortese, David Warrilow, Hans Peter Hallwachs	Drama	a.k.a. La Ferdinanda: Sonata for a Medici Villa
Fire and Sword	Veith von Fürstenberg	Christoph Waltz, Antonia Preser, Leigh Lawson, Peter Firth, Vladek Sheybal	Fantasy	a.k.a. The Legend of Tristan and Isolde
Flächenbrand	Alexander von Eschwege	Horst Frank, Manfred Krug, Curt Bois, Nina Hoger	Drama	
François Villon	Werner Schlechte	Jörg Pleva, Louise Martini	Biography	
Frankfurt: The Face of a City	Roger Fritz	Michaela Karger, Dave Balko, Hanno Pöschl, Kurt Raab	Exploitation	
Das Frauenzimmer	Claudia von Alemann	Colleen Finneran, Évelyne Didi, Denise Péron, Jean Badin	Drama	
Freak Orlando	Ulrike Ottinger	Delphine Seyrig, Magdalena Montezuma, Eddie Constantine	Drama	
Geld oder Leben	Peter Patzak	Stephan Schwartz, Karl Michael Vogler, Adelheid Arndt	Crime	
God's Angry Man	Werner Herzog		Documentary	
Die Grenze	Jürgen Karl Klauß	Gustl Bayrhammer, Manfred Günther	Drama	a.k.a. The Border
Gute Reise	Wilfried Dotzel	Siegfried W. Kernen, Monika Gabriel, Rose Renée Roth, Wolf-Dietrich Berg, Heinz Meier, Ulrich Faulhaber, Evelyn Hamann	Comedy	
Das Haus im Park	Aribert Weis	Wilfried Labmeier, Ulrich Pleitgen, Christine Pascal	Crime	
Die Heimsuchung des Assistenten Jung	Thomas Schamoni	Knut Koch, Tommi Piper, Petra Maria Grühn	Thriller	
Die Hinrichtung	Wolfgang F. Henschel	Helmut Qualtinger, Hannes Messemer, Eddie Constantine	Black comedy	West German-Austrian co-production
Hot Bubblegum	Boaz Davidson	Yftach Katzur, Jonathan Sagall, Zachi Noy, Sibylle Rauch	Comedy	a.k.a. Lemon Popsicle III; Israeli-West German co-production
Huie's Sermon	Werner Herzog		Documentary	
Die Hungerinsel	Horst Flick	Lisa Kreuzer	Drama, War	
Ich möchte fliehen	Tom Toelle	Armin Mueller-Stahl, Ulli Philipp	Drama	a.k.a. Ja und Nein
Im Regen nach Amerika	Wilma Kottusch	Gila von Weitershausen, Wolf Roth	Drama	
In the Land of Cockaigne	Fritz Umgelter	Arnfried Lerche, Bernhard Wicki, Barbara Rütting, Karl Michael Vogler, Otto Sander	Drama	a.k.a. Im Schlaraffenland
The Inventor	Kurt Gloor	Bruno Ganz, Walo Lüönd	Comedy	Swiss-West German co-production
Die Jahre vergehen	Peter Keglevic	Stephan Schwartz, Silvia Reize, Hanno Pöschl, Karl Michael Vogler, Rosel Zech, Herbert Fux	Drama	West German-Austrian co-production
Jeans	Hartmut Griesmayr	Hans-Georg Panczak, Agnes Dünneisen, Dieter Kirchlechner	Drama	
Jetzt und alles	Dieter Meier	Richy Müller, Jean-Pierre Kalfon	Crime, Music	
The Just Assassins	Frank Guthke	Jan Niklas, Heidelinde Weis	Drama	a.k.a. Die Gerechten
Das Käthchen von Heilbronn	Peter Beauvais	Marita Marschall, Manfred Zapatka, Günter Lamprecht, Cornelia Froboess, Dietrich Fischer-Dieskau	Drama	
Kein Land	Karsten Wichniarz, Rigo Manikofski	Karsten Wichniarz, Birgit Anders	Crime drama	
Kennwort Schmetterling	Claus Peter Witt	Dieter Laser, Gerd Baltus, Hannes Messemer, Lisa Kreuzer, Joachim Dietmar Mues, Donata Höffer, Gert Haucke	Crime	a.k.a. Kennwort Schmetterling – Verbrechen in Hypnose
Klavierspiele	Gerhard Kelling	Brigitte Janner, Tilo Prückner, Matthias Fuchs	Drama	
Klopfzeichen	Helmut Schwarzbach	Helmuth Lohner	Drama	
Komm doch mit nach Monte Carlo	Berengar Pfahl	Ulrike Kriener	Comedy	
Der König und sein Narr	Frank Beyer	Götz George, Wolfgang Kieling, Reinhard Kolldehoff, Gert Haucke	Biography	a.k.a. The King and His Fool a.k.a. The King and His Jester
Kudenow	Claus Peter Witt	Ulf Schweikhardt, Witta Pohl, Uwe Dallmeier, Regine Lamster	Drama	a.k.a. Kudenow oder An fremden Wassern weinen
Landluft	Claus Peter Witt	Friedrich-Karl Praetorius, Regine Lamster, Uwe Dallmeier	Drama	
Legen wir zusammen	Hans-Peter Kaufmann	Otto Sander, Ruth Drexel, Hans Brenner	Drama	
Leiche auf Urlaub	Hans-Jürgen Tögel	Judy Winter, Jean-Marc Thibault, François-Éric Gendron, Michel Such, Udo Vioff	Thriller	a.k.a. Opération Primevère. West German-French co-production
Lili Marleen	Rainer Werner Fassbinder	Hanna Schygulla, Giancarlo Giannini, Mel Ferrer, Karl-Heinz von Hassel, Hark Bohm, Christine Kaufmann	War, Music, Drama	
Lisa und Tshepo	Erika Runge	Pia Hänggi, Dumisani Mabaso	Drama	
The Living Corpse	Otto Schenk	Helmuth Lohner, Sabine von Maydell, Marianne Nentwich, Hartmut Becker	Drama	
Lola	Rainer Werner Fassbinder	Barbara Sukowa, Armin Mueller-Stahl, Mario Adorf, Matthias Fuchs	Drama	3rd part of BRD Trilogy
Looping	Walter Bockmayer, Rolf Bührmann	Shelley Winters, Hans Christian Blech, Sydne Rome, Ingrid Caven	Drama	a.k.a. Looping – Der lange Traum vom großen Glück
A Lot of Bills to Pay	Adolf Winkelmann	Detlev Quandt, Hermann Lause	Comedy	a.k.a. A Lot of Coal
Der Magnetiseur	Peter Weck	Gerd Baltus, Günther Maria Halmer	Drama	
A Majority of One	Wolf Dietrich	Inge Meysel, Shunzo Sanchome	Comedy	a.k.a. Die kluge Witwe
Malou	Jeanine Meerapfel	Ingrid Caven, Grischa Huber, Helmut Griem, Ivan Desny	Drama	
The Man in Pyjamas	Hartmann Schmige, Christian Rateuke	Otto Sander, Elke Sommer, Peter Fitz, Hermann Lause	Comedy	
Marianne and Juliane	Margarethe von Trotta	Jutta Lampe, Barbara Sukowa, Rüdiger Vogler	Drama	a.k.a. The German Sisters a.k.a. Die bleierne Zeit
Mephisto	István Szabó	Klaus Maria Brandauer, Rolf Hoppe, Krystyna Janda, Karin Boyd	Drama	Hungarian-West German-East German-Austrian co-production. Based on a story by Klaus Mann
Mit Gewissenhaftigkeit und Würde	Eberhard Itzenplitz	Rainer Hunold	Drama	
Der Mond ist nur a nackerte Kugel	Jörg Graser	Sigfrit Steiner, Elisabeth Stepanek, Peter Turrini	Drama	
Mutschmanns Reise	Hanno Lunin	Detlef Jacobsen, Christiane Pauli	Comedy	
Der Nächste, bitte	Michael Günther	Rosel Zech, Evelyn Hamann, Ernst Stankovski, Gerhard Olschewski, Joachim Kemmer, Wolfgang Wahl	Comedy	a.k.a. La main passe
Der Neger Erwin	Herbert Achternbusch	Herbert Achternbusch	Drama	Entered into the 31st Berlin International Film Festival
Niemandsland	Dieter Berner	Karl Kröpfl, Julia Lindig	Drama	Austrian-West German co-production
Nightfall	Beate Klöckner	Barbara Rudnik, Gordon Mitchell	Thriller	a.k.a. Kopfschuss
No Mercy, No Future	Helma Sanders-Brahms	Elisabeth Stepanek	Drama	a.k.a. Die Berührte
No Terraced House for Robin Hood	Wolf Gremm	Jutta Speidel, Hermann Lause, Brigitte Mira	Crime	a.k.a. Kein Reihenhaus für Robin Hood
Ohne Rückfahrkarte	Jürgen Karl Klauß	Stefan Staudinger, Pola Kinski	Drama	a.k.a. One Way Ticket
Das Ordensband	Michael Günther	Ursela Monn, Klaus Höhne	Comedy	a.k.a. The Ribbon
Die Ortliebschen Frauen	Luc Bondy	Edith Heerdegen, Libgart Schwarz, Elisabeth Stepanek, Klaus Pohl	Drama	
Paulinchen war allein zu Haus	Anne Voss	Carola Regnier, Peter Danzeisen, Nicole Hendel	Drama	
Perle der Karibik	Manfred Stelzer	Alisa Saltzman, Diethard Wendtland	Comedy	
Der Poltergeist	Jindřich Mann	Heinz Moog, Friedhelm Ptok, Elisabeth Rath, Mareike Carrière	Drama	
Pommi Stern	Kristian Kühn	Steve Strange and Visage, Gillian Scalici, Stephan Schwartz, Gustav Fröhlich, Tommi Piper	Musical	
Possession	Andrzej Żuławski	Sam Neill, Isabelle Adjani, Heinz Bennent, Margit Carstensen	Horror	French-West German co-production
Preußische Nacht	Oswald Döpke	Gerd Böckmann, Cordula Trantow	Biography, History	
Pseudonym Hans Fallada	Lutz Büscher	Joachim Bliese, Dieter Borsche	Biography, Docudrama	
Quartett bei Claudia	Michael Kehlmann	Karl Michael Vogler, Dagmar Mettler, Karin Anselm, Ernst Stankovski, Witta Pohl, Willy Semmelrogge	Drama	Based on A Quartet at Sheila's
Raid in Glasgow	Wolfgang Hantke	Götz George, Evelyn Opela, Ferdy Mayne, Dietlinde Turban, Günter Mack, Hans Helmut Dickow	Crime	a.k.a. Die for Big Betsy
Raindrops	Harry Raymon, Michael Hoffmann	Jack Geula, Elfriede Irrall, Walter Renneisen	Drama	
Der Richter	Stephan Meyer	Christoph Bantzer, Ingrid Andree, Marianne Hoppe, Jan Niklas, Hans-Michael Rehberg, Wolfgang Büttner	Drama	
Der richtige Mann	Dieter Berner	Wolfram Berger, Hilde Berger	Drama	Austrian-West German co-production
Romeo und Julia ist ein schwer spielbares Stück	Hilde Bechert	Dorothée Reize	Drama	
Die Rumplhanni	Rainer Wolffhardt	Monika Baumgartner	Drama	
Schattenlinien	Dagmar Damek	Claus Eberth, Barbara Freier, Felix von Manteuffel	Drama	
Der Schatz des Priamos	Karl Fruchtmann	Tilo Prückner, Olga Karlatos, Ronald Hines, Heinz Moog	Biography	a.k.a. Treasure of Priam
Der Schützling	Rolf von Sydow	Udo Vioff, Curt Bois, Gustav Knuth, Rudolf Schündler, Simone Rethel, Friedrich Schoenfelder, Alice Treff, Harry Wüstenhagen	Comedy	a.k.a. His Friend at Court
Sechsunddreißig Stunden	Georg Madeja	Wolfram Berger, Christine Golin	Drama	a.k.a. 36 Stunden. West German-Austrian co-production
The Second Skin	Frank Beyer	Angelica Domröse, Hilmar Thate, Jana Brejchová, Edith Heerdegen	Drama	
Der Spot oder Fast eine Karriere	Rainer Erler	Claus Obalski, Wolfgang Kieling, Alexander May, Dietrich Mattausch, Andrea L'Arronge, Elisabeth Endriss	Comedy	a.k.a. The Commercial, or Halfway Up the Ladder of Success
Sting in the Flesh	Heidi Genée	Helmut Griem, Barbara Lass	Comedy	a.k.a. Thorn in the Flesh
Strike Back	Carl Schenkel	Dave Balko, Hanns Zischler, Otto Sander	Crime drama	a.k.a. Cold as Ice
Student Gerber	Wolfgang Glück	Gabriel Barylli, Werner Kreindl	Drama	a.k.a. Young Gerber a.k.a. Der Schüler Gerber. Austrian-West German co-production
The Subjective Factor	Helke Sander	Angelika Rommel	Drama	
Le Système Ribadier	Claus Peter Witt	Harald Juhnke, Gerd Baltus, Heinz Schubert, Gaby Gasser	Comedy	a.k.a. System Ribadier
Tante Maria	Wolfgang Panzer	Rosemarie Fendel, Gedeon Burkhard	Comedy	
Taxi zum Klo	Frank Ripploh	Frank Ripploh, Bernd Broaderup	Drama	
The Temptation	Krzysztof Zanussi	Maja Komorowska, Helmut Griem, Mathieu Carrière	Drama	
Der Tisch	Rolf Busch	Dvora Kedar, Klaus Barner	Drama, War	a.k.a. The Table
Der Traum vom Glück	Maximiliane Mainka	Bernd Herberger, Ulrike Luderer, Martin Umbach	Drama	
Trokadero	Klaus Emmerich	Ludwig Hirsch, Franz Xaver Kroetz, Lisi Mangold	Comedy	Entered into the 12th Moscow International Film Festival
Und plötzlich bist du draußen	Eugen York	Wolfgang Bathke, Dagmar Biener	Drama	
Ein Vogel auf dem Leim	Heinz Schirk	Ulrike Bliefert, Rainer Hunold	Drama	
Von einem Tag zum anderen	Wolfgang Becker	Gerd Böckmann, Karin Anselm	Drama	
Vor den Vätern sterben die Söhne	Claudia Holldack	Eva Mattes, Klaus Pohl, Peter Seum	Drama	
Der Wald	Wilm ten Haaf	Maria Schell, Ekkehardt Belle, Monika Baumgartner, Herbert Fleischmann, Wolfgang Büttner	Comedy	a.k.a. The Forest
Warnung aus dem Käfig	Peter von Zahn	Günter Mack, Christine Wodetzky, Horst Frank, Gerhard Olschewski	Docudrama, Cold War spy film	a.k.a. Der Fall Frucht
Der Wasserball von Schildershausen	Michael Lähn	Günter Strack	Comedy	
Wer den Schaden hat ...	Dieter Wedel	Jörg Pleva, Hannelore Elsner, Rainer Basedow, Hans Korte	Drama	
Ein Zug nach Manhattan	Rolf von Sydow	Heinz Rühmann	Drama	
Zuhaus in fremden Betten	Michael Günther	Siegfried W. Kernen, Rudolf Strobl	Comedy	
Zum Frühstück zwei Männer	Harald Philipp	Grit Boettcher, Peer Augustinski, Ivan Desny	Comedy	
Zurück an den Absender	Thomas Engel	Rudolf Platte, Paul Hubschmid	Comedy	
Zwei Freunde in Preußen	Rolf Busch	Jan Spitzer, Michael Pan	Biography	West German-East German co-production
Zwischen Mond und Sonne	Recha Jungmann	Titus Spree	Docudrama	

== 1982 ==
Title	Director	Cast	Genre	Notes
Ab in den Süden	Wilfried Dotzel	Eberhard Feik, Gert Haucke, Brigitte Mira, Karl Michael Vogler, Rainer Hunold	Comedy	
Der Alte aus der Tomatengasse	Helmut Kissel	Hans Christian Blech	Drama	a.k.a. Crainquebille
Die Ängste, die sitzen tief drin	Bruno Jantoss	Helena Rosenkranz, Rainer Rudolph	Drama	a.k.a. Die Ängste, die sitzen tief drin – Therapie einer Zweierbeziehung
Any Wednesday	Wolfgang Spier	Barbara Schöne, Liselotte Pulver, Günter Pfitzmann, Herbert Herrmann	Comedy	a.k.a. Jeden Mittwoch
Aufdermauer	Lutz Konermann	Klaus Abramowsky, Klaus Grünberg, Susann B. Winter	Crime drama	
Der Auslöser	Maria Neocleous	Judy Winter, Beate Finckh, Peter Fitz	Drama	
The Axe of Wandsbek	Heinrich Breloer, Horst Königstein	Roland Schäfer, Angelika Thomas, Joachim Dietmar Mues	Drama	
Die Aufgabe des Dr. med. Graefe	Thomas Fantl	Günther Flesch, Sabine Postel	Drama	
Banana Joe	Steno	Bud Spencer, Gunther Philipp	Comedy	Italian-West German co-production
Die Barrikade	Jürgen Karl Klauß	Heinz Hoenig, Alexander Radszun, Peter Pasetti, Gert Haucke, Christine Wodetzky, Míla Myslíková	History	West German-Czechoslovak co-production
Be Gentle, Penguin	Peter Hajek	Marie Colbin, Heinz Hoenig, Rainer Hunold, Petra Jokisch	Comedy	a.k.a. Sei zärtlich, Pinguin. Austrian-West German co-production
The Beastmaster	Don Coscarelli	Marc Singer, Tanya Roberts, Rip Torn	Fantasy	American production with West German money
Besuch von drüben	Günter Gräwert	Erika Wackernagel, Edwin Marian, Marie-Luise Marjan	Comedy	
Betti, die Tochter	Heinz Schirk	Claudia Schermutzki, Hartmut Reck, Herta Fahrenkrog	Drama	a.k.a. Betti, die Tochter – Eine Geschichte aus Hamburg
Das blaue Bidet	Claus Peter Witt	Klaus Schwarzkopf	Comedy	
Brandmale	George Moorse	Gila von Weitershausen, Anne Bennent, Hub Martin	Drama	
Breakfast with Julia	Kurt Wilhelm	Monika Dahlberg, Günther Ungeheuer, Hein Boele, Francesca Tu	Comedy	
Brigitta	Wolfgang Glück	Joséphine Derenne, András Bálint	Drama	Austrian-West German-Hungarian co-production
Capriccio Infernale	Wilma Kottusch	Barbara Rudnik, Stefan Staudinger, Rudolf Schündler	Drama	
Captain Berlin	Jörg Buttgereit	Jörg Buttgereit, Bela B	Short	
Comeback	Christel Buschmann	Eric Burdon, Julie Carmen	Drama, Music	
Crazy Jungle Adventure	Harald Reinl	James Mitchum, Werner Pochath, Thomas Ohrner, Klaus Havenstein	Comedy	
Danny's Dream	Sigi Rothemund	Alexander Rosenberg, Jutta Speidel	Drama	
Dazwischen	Doris Dörrie	Carmen Eckhardt	Drama	
The Day of Reckoning	Bernd Schadewald	Kornelia Boje, Hansjoachim Krietsch	Thriller	
The Deadlock	Rolf Busch	Leslie Malton, Heinz Baumann, Gerd Baltus, Udo Vioff	Drama	a.k.a. In der Sackgasse
Deadly Game	Károly Makk	Barbara Sukowa, Helmut Berger, Mel Ferrer	Thriller	a.k.a. Die Jäger
Dear Mr. Wonderful	Peter Lilienthal	Joe Pesci, Karen Ludwig, Evan Handler, Frank Vincent, Paul Herman, Ed O'Ross, Ben Dova, Tony Martin	Drama	a.k.a. Ruby's Dream
Depart to Arrive	Alexandra von Grote	Gabriele Osburg, Ute Cremer	Drama	
Eine deutsche Revolution	Helmut Herbst	Franz Wittich, Gregor Hansen	Docudrama, History	a.k.a. A German Revolution. Entered into the 32nd Berlin International Film Festival
Deutschland kann manchmal sehr schön sein	Solveig Hoogesteijn	Julia Siemers, Hanns Zischler, Despina Pajanou, Eva Mattes	Drama	
Doctor Faustus	Franz Seitz	Jon Finch, André Heller, Hanns Zischler, Siemen Rühaak, Marie-Hélène Breillat, Margot Hielscher, Hans Korte	Drama	Entered into the 13th Moscow International Film Festival
Domino	Thomas Brasch	Katharina Thalbach, Bernhard Wicki, Hanns Zischler, Anne Bennent	Drama	
Dr. Margarete Johnsohn	Dagmar Damek	Judy Winter, Christoph Waltz, Karl Walter Diess, Jutta Speidel	Drama	a.k.a. Frau Dr. Johnsohn
Dr. med Mathilde Wagner – Ein Frauenstudium in Freiburg	Rainer Horbelt	Rita Engelmann, Wolfgang Preiss, Franz Rudnick	Biography	
Drei gegen Hollywood	Sigi Rothemund	Hans Peter Korff, Beatrice Richter, Ulrich Faulhaber, Lambert Hamel, Elisabeth Volkmann, Christine Zierl, Brigitte Mira	Comedy	a.k.a. Once in a Lifetime
Egmont	Franz Peter Wirth	Manfred Zapatka, Catherine Frot, Rolf Boysen, Rolf Becker, Anouk Ferjac	Drama	West German-French co-production
Ehe oder Liebe	Sigi Rothemund	Heidi Brühl, Claus Biederstaedt	Comedy	
Einer von uns	Eberhard Itzenplitz	Siemen Rühaak, Anita Lochner	Drama, War	
Elective Affinities	Claude Chabrol	Stéphane Audran, Helmut Griem, Michael Degen	Drama	French-West German-Czechoslovak co-production
Die Entscheidung	Konrad Sabrautzky	Senta Berger, Renate Schroeter	Drama	
Eine etwas sonderbare Dame	Rolf von Sydow, Gero Erhardt	Lilli Palmer	Comedy	a.k.a. The Curious Savage
Euch darf ich's wohl gestehen	Egon Günther	Robert Freitag, Michael Gempart	Biography	
Eugenie Marlitt und "Die Gartenlaube"	Herbert Ballmann	Cordula Trantow, Armin Mueller-Stahl, Ursela Monn, Rolf Henniger, Klaus Herm, Michael Hinz	Biography	
Ein Fall von Zuneigung	Imo Moszkowicz	Dieter Schidor	Comedy, Fantasy	
Falsche Liebe	Annelie Runge	Verena Buss, Stefan Matousch	Drama	
Der Fan	Eckhart Schmidt	Désirée Nosbusch, Bodo Staiger	Horror	a.k.a. The Fan
Festspiele	Marcel Ophuls	Marlies Engel, Karl-Heinz Vosgerau, Wolfgang Höper, Marcel Ophuls	Comedy	
The Fifth Woman	Alberto Negrin	Klaus Maria Brandauer, Turi Ferro, Aurore Clément, Marina Pierro	Crime	a.k.a. La quinta donna. Italian-Austrian-West German co-production
Fitzcarraldo	Werner Herzog	Klaus Kinski, Claudia Cardinale	Adventure	
Fleeting Acquaintances	Marianne Lüdcke	Angelica Domröse, Günter Lamprecht, Helmut Berger, Hannes Messemer, Christa Berndl, Petra Jokisch	Drama	
Flucht aus London	Wolfgang Storch	Matthias Ponnier, Friedhelm Ptok, Angelika Bender, Anja Kruse	Crime	a.k.a. Two Men in Twenty
Flucht aus Pommern	Eberhard Schubert	Armin Mueller-Stahl, Marie-Charlott Schüler, Klaus Höhne, André Wilms, Rudolf Schündler, Stephan Schwartz, Alexander Radszun	War	
Frau Jenny Treibel	Franz Josef Wild	Maria Schell, Dietlinde Turban, Christian Berkel, Ernst Jacobi, Hannes Messemer, Karin Anselm	Drama	
Fremdes Land oder Als die Freiheit noch zu haben war	Claus Peter Witt	Michael Weber, Rainer Schmitt	Drama	
Fünf letzte Tage	Percy Adlon	Lena Stolze, Irm Hermann	Biography, War	a.k.a. Five Last Days a.k.a. Last Five Days
Der Gärtner von Toulouse	Günter Gräwert	Hildegard Knef, Benedict Freitag, Silvia Janisch	Drama	
Der Gast	Wolfgang Mühlbauer	Rolf Zacher, Peter Sattmann, Monika Baumgartner, Jörg Hube, Claus Theo Gärtner	Comedy	
The Ghost	Herbert Achternbusch	Herbert Achternbusch	Drama	a.k.a. Das Gespenst. Entered into the 33rd Berlin International Film Festival
Das Glück beim Händewaschen	Werner Masten	Mario Baumgartner, Brigitte Karner	Drama	Austrian-Swiss-Italian-West German co-production
Der glücklose Mann	Rolf Basedow	Rolf Zacher, Kurt Raab, Silvia Janisch	Crime	
God Does Not Believe in Us Anymore	Axel Corti	Johannes Silberschneider, Armin Mueller-Stahl, Fritz Muliar	Drama	a.k.a. Where to and Back 1. Austrian-West German-Swiss co-production
Der grüne Stern	Heide Pils	Amadeus August	Science fiction	West German-Austrian co-production
Ein gutes Land	Horatius Haeberle	Tariq Yunus, Petra Jokisch, Dieter Laser, Ivan Desny, Rolf Zacher	Drama	West German-Indian co-production
Hambacher Frühling	Eberhard Itzenplitz	Wolfgang Schwarz, Gaby Dohm, Wolfgang Arps	Docudrama	
The Hasty Heart	Michael Kehlmann	Dagmar Mettler, Peter Fricke, Christian Kohlund, Sigmar Solbach, Michael Habeck, Peter Dirschauer	Drama, War	a.k.a. Das heiße Herz
Heimkehr nach Deutschland	Eberhard Pieper	Eva-Maria Hagen, Paul Dahlke, Monica Bleibtreu, Claudio Caramaschi, Evelyn Opela	Drama	
The Heiress	Franz Josef Wild	Heidelinde Weis, Alexander Kerst, Alexander Waechter	Drama	a.k.a. Die Erbin
Herr Herr	Nicolas Gessner	Rudolf Bissegger, Katja Rupé, César Keiser, Helmut Förnbacher, Wolfram Berger, Sigfrit Steiner, Gert Westphal, Anne-Marie Blanc, Peter Arens	Drama	Swiss-West German co-production
Der Heuler	Rosemarie Fendel	Heidelinde Weis, Matthias Ponnier	Family	
High Society Limited	Ottokar Runze	Lilli Palmer, Elisabeth Bergner, Hardy Krüger, Vadim Glowna, Heinz Schubert	Crime comedy	
Ich fühle was, was Du nicht fühlst	Helga Krauss	Donata Höffer, Yves Jansen	Comedy	
I'll Be Waiting	Stanislav Barabáš	Armin Mueller-Stahl, Monica Bleibtreu, Franz Xaver Kroetz	Crime	
Im Morgenwind	Eberhard Itzenplitz	Eva Maria Bauer, Benjamin Völz	Drama	
Imperative	Krzysztof Zanussi	Robert Powell, Brigitte Fossey, Leslie Caron, Matthias Habich, Sigfrit Steiner	Drama	
Jägerschlacht	Wigbert Wicker	Bernd Stephan, Heinrich Schweiger, Günther Ungeheuer	Drama	
Jaipur Junction	W. Werner Schaefer	Herbert Knaup, Victor Banerjee, Neena Gupta	Thriller	
Jonny Granat	Volker Vogeler	Wigand Witting	Drama	
Kamikaze 1989	Wolf Gremm	Rainer Werner Fassbinder, Boy Gobert, Franco Nero, Brigitte Mira, Günther Kaufmann, Richy Müller, Nicole Heesters, Petra Jokisch	Science fiction	
Die Klassefrau	Rainer Wolffhardt	Viola Sauer, Detlef Kessler	Drama	
Der kleine Bruder	Rainer Söhnlein	Herbert Stass, Ilsemarie Schnering, Hannes Messemer	Drama	a.k.a. The Little Brother
Kraftprobe	Heidi Genée	Hannelore Hoger, Kirstin Genée	Drama	a.k.a. Test of Strength. Entered into the 32nd Berlin International Film Festival
The Last Revenge	Rainer Kirberg	Erwin Leder, Der Plan	Musical, Fantasy	
Leben im Winter	Hartmut Griesmayr	Brigitte Mira, Paul Dahlke, Elisabeth Endriss, Herbert Stass	Drama	
Leutersbronner Geschichten	Hartmut Griesmayr	Matthias Ponnier, Hans Hirschmüller, Erich Ludwig, Rita Leska, Monica Bleibtreu, Franz Rudnick, Tilli Breidenbach	Drama	
Liebeskonzil	Werner Schroeter	Antonio Salines, Magdalena Montezuma, Kurt Raab, Margit Carstensen	Drama	a.k.a. The Council of Love a.k.a. The Love Council
The Lite Trap	Niklaus Schilling	Armin Mueller-Stahl, Beatrice Kessler	Drama	a.k.a. Der Westen leuchtet!
Little Zaches called Cinnabar	Frank Strecker	Werner Kwoll, Bernd Herberger, Ernst Stankovski, Dietlinde Turban, Günter Pfitzmann, Günter Mack	Fantasy	a.k.a. Little Zaches, Surnamed Zinnober a.k.a. Little Zack
The Logic of Emotion	Ingo Kratisch	Rüdiger Vogler, Grischa Huber, Remo Remotti, Klaus Hoffmann, Hanns Zischler, Bruno Ganz	Drama	
Macumba	Elfi Mikesch	Magdalena Montezuma, Bernd Broaderup	Crime	
The Magic Mountain	Hans W. Geißendörfer	Christoph Eichhorn, Rod Steiger, Charles Aznavour, Marie-France Pisier, Hans Christian Blech	Drama	West German-French-Italian co-production
Les Maîtres du temps	René Laloux, Tibor Hernádi (technical director)	—N/a	Independent animated science fiction	a.k.a. Time Masters. French-Swiss-West German-British-Hungarian co-production
The Man on the Wall	Reinhard Hauff	Marius Müller-Westernhagen, Julie Carmen, Towje Kleiner	Drama	
Männer	Peter Beauvais	Siemen Rühaak, Johannes Schaaf	Comedy	
Mein Bruder und ich	Claus Peter Witt	Hermann Prey, Rada Rassimov, Dorothea Parton, Wolfgang Kieling, Michael Degen, Gert Haucke, Kurt Nachmann	Musical	
Meister Eder und sein Pumuckl	Ulrich König	Hans Clarin (voice), Gustl Bayrhammer	Family	
Mensch Meier	Franz Xaver Kroetz	Franz Xaver Kroetz, Veronika Fitz, Maximilian Krückl	Drama	
Mira's House	Dagmar Damek	Brigitte Fossey, Doris Kunstmann, Dieter Laser, Franz Buchrieser, Tilo Prückner, Marie Colbin	Drama	
Mrs. 'Arris Goes to Paris	Peter Weck	Inge Meysel, Wolfgang Preiss, Christiane Hörbiger, Günther Maria Halmer, Heinrich Schweiger	Comedy	a.k.a. Ein Kleid von Dior
Die Murmel	Bruno Voges	Brigitte Mira, Irmgard Först, Hans Richter, Uwe Dallmeier, Marie-Luise Marjan	Fantasy	a.k.a. The Marble
Die Mutprobe	Michael Verhoeven	Peter Welz, Günther Maria Halmer, Gabi Marr, Melanie Horeschowsky	Drama	
Muttertreu	Gernot Eigler	Christoph Quest, Inge Birkmann	Drama	
The Mysterious Stranger	Peter H. Hunt	Chris Makepeace, Bernhard Wicki, Fred Gwynne, Herbert Fux, Christoph Waltz, Towje Kleiner	Fantasy	American-West German co-production
Nach Wien!	Friedemann Beyer	Friedrich Steinhauer	Drama	
Der Narr von Wien	John Goldschmidt	Kurt Sowinetz	Biography	Austrian-West German co-production
Neon City	Dominik Graf, Wolfgang Büld, Helmer von Lützelburg, Gisela Weilemann, Johann Schmid	Michaela May, Billie Zöckler, Lisa Kreuzer, Christiane F., Charles Brauer, Barbara Freier, Stefan Wood	Anthology	a.k.a. The City of Neon
Night Crossing	Delbert Mann	John Hurt, Beau Bridges, Jane Alexander, Ian Bannen, Klaus Löwitsch, Günter Meisner	Drama	American-West German co-production
Night of the Wolves	Rüdiger Nüchtern	Daniela Obermeir, Ali Arkadas, Karl-Heinz von Liebezeit	Drama	
Out of Time	Michael Bentele	Ute Wieland, Jürgen Seybold	Musical, Fantasy	
Parsifal	Hans-Jürgen Syberberg	Edith Clever	Musical	West German-French co-production. Screened at the 1982 Cannes Film Festival
The Passerby	Jacques Rouffio	Romy Schneider, Michel Piccoli, Helmut Griem, Mathieu Carrière, Maria Schell	Drama	French-West German co-production
The Passionate	Thomas Koerfer	Lutz Weidlich, Sunnyi Melles, Hanns Zischler	Drama, Biography	a.k.a. Die Leidenschaftlichen. West German-Swiss-Austrian co-production
Phönix an der Ecke	Peter Patzak	Rainer Egger, Marieli Fröhlich, Pinkas Braun, Robert Hoffmann, Hanno Pöschl	Drama	Austrian-West German co-production
Piratensender Powerplay	Sigi Rothemund	Thomas Gottschalk, Mike Krüger	Comedy	
Die Präsidentin	Michael Günther	Heinz Schubert, Gaby Gasser, Claus Biederstaedt, Bruni Löbel	Comedy	a.k.a. La Présidente
Praying Mantis	Jack Gold	Jonathan Pryce, Cherie Lunghi, Pinkas Braun, Friedrich von Thun, Arthur Brauss	Crime	British-West German co-production
Qualverwandtschaften	Ulrich Heising	Hans Christian Blech, Bernd Tauber, Günter Mack	Drama	
Querelle	Rainer Werner Fassbinder	Brad Davis, Franco Nero, Jeanne Moreau, Hanno Pöschl, Günther Kaufmann, Burkhard Driest	Drama	French-West German co-production
Red Love	Rosa von Praunheim	Sascha Hammer, Mark Eins, Helga Goetze, Eddie Constantine	Drama	
Rendezvous in Paris	Gabi Kubach	Claude Jade, Harald Kuhlmann, Barry Stokes	Thriller	a.k.a. Men Never Know. French-West German co-production
Room 666	Wim Wenders		Documentary	French-West German co-production
S.A.S. à San Salvador	Raoul Coutard	Miles O'Keeffe, Raimund Harmstorf, Dagmar Lassander, Anton Diffring, Alexander Kerst, Sybil Danning	Action thriller	a.k.a. S.A.S. Malko – Im Auftrag des Pentagon. French-West German co-production
Sapiches	Boaz Davidson	Yftach Katzur, Jonathan Sagall, Zachi Noy	Comedy	a.k.a. Private Popsicle. Israeli-West German co-production
Schnitzeljagd	Berengar Pfahl	Ulrike Kriener, Verena Plangger, Volker Lippmann	Drama	
Schuld sind nur die Frauen	Rolf von Sydow, Eugen York	Harald Juhnke, Jutta Speidel, Barbara Schöne, Simone Rethel, Karin Eickelbaum, Erik Ode	Comedy	
Second Sight	Dominik Graf	Greta Scacchi, Thomas Schücke	Thriller	a.k.a. The Second Face
Single liebt Single	Wolf Dietrich	Peter Bongartz, Angelika Bender, Rita Engelmann, Christiane Carstens, Arnfried Lerche, Jochen Schroeder, Joachim Kerzel, Cornelia Meinhardt	Comedy	
Sleepless Days	Diethard Klante	Hans Peter Hallwachs, Hannelore Hoger	Drama	
The State of Things	Wim Wenders	Patrick Bauchau, Allen Garfield, Rebecca Pauly	Drama	West German-American-Portuguese co-production
Stella	Franz Josef Wild	Judy Winter, Dietlinde Turban, Robert Atzorn	Drama	
Die Stunde des Löwen	Hartmut Griesmayr	Judy Winter, Dietmar Schönherr, Dieter Kirchlechner, Udo Vioff	Thriller	
The Sunshine Boys	Rolf von Sydow	Johannes Heesters, Carl-Heinz Schroth, Herbert Herrmann	Comedy	
Tarabas	Michael Kehlmann	Helmuth Lohner, Günter Mack, Klausjürgen Wussow	War	Austrian-West German co-production
Der Tod in der Waschstraße	Friedemann Schulz	Benjamin Völz, Beate Finckh, Henning Venske, Rosemarie Fendel	Drama	
Tscherwonez	Gábor Altorjay	The Wirtschaftswunder, Péter Halász, Stephan Balint, Sheryl Sutton	Crime	a.k.a. Chervonets
The Unapproachable	Krzysztof Zanussi	Leslie Caron, Danny Webb, Leslie Malton	Drama	a.k.a. Die Unerreichbare
Und das am 80. Geburtstag	Rolf von Sydow	Carl-Heinz Schroth	Comedy	a.k.a. First Person Singular
Ungleicher Lohn	Christa Maar	Walo Lüönd, Franz Xaver Kroetz, Claude-Oliver Rudolph, Veronika Fitz, Rolf Zacher	Drama	
Die Vernehmung der zwangsgeräumten Mathilde Ä.	Joachim Roering	Johanna von Koczian, Hansjörg Felmy, Liane Hielscher	Comedy	
Veronika Voss	Rainer Werner Fassbinder	Rosel Zech, Hilmar Thate, Cornelia Froboess	Drama	Second in the BRD Trilogy
Villa zu vermieten	Thomas Engel	Edith Heerdegen, Ruth Hellberg, Günter Strack, Claus Biederstaedt	Comedy	
The Visit	Max Peter Ammann	Maria Schell, Günter Lamprecht	Drama	a.k.a. Der Besuch der alten Dame. West German-Swiss co-production.
War and Peace	Volker Schlöndorff, Alexander Kluge, Stefan Aust, Axel Engstfeld	Bruno Ganz, Jürgen Prochnow, Angela Winkler, Heinz Bennent, Hans-Michael Rehberg, Manfred Zapatka	Anthology	
Warum hast du so traurige Augen	Tom Toelle	Werner Stocker, Ingrid Caven, Martin Semmelrogge, Michael Habeck, Monika Baumgartner, Kurt Weinzierl, Helga Anders, Irm Hermann, Ulrich Matschoss	Musical	a.k.a. Warum hast du so traurige Augen – Geschichten aus einem Tango-Lokal a.k.a. Vorstadt-Tango
We	Vojtěch Jasný	Dieter Laser, Sabine von Maydell	Science fiction	
Die Weiße Rose	Michael Verhoeven	Lena Stolze, Wulf Kessler, Werner Stocker, Ulrich Tukur, Martin Benrath	Historical drama, War	a.k.a. The White Rose
When We Are Married	Hans-Peter Kaufmann	Christiane Hörbiger, Hans Korte, Willy Millowitsch, Gert Haucke, Elisabeth Wiedemann	Comedy	a.k.a. Wenn wir verheiratet sind
Who's Crazy, Doc?	Stefan Lukschy, Christian Rateuke	Otto Sander, Sunnyi Melles, Peter Fitz, Hannelore Elsner, Richy Müller, Loriot	Comedy	
Whoops-a-Daisy	Ralf Gregan	Karl Michael Vogler, Uwe Friedrichsen, Michaela May, Krista Keller	Comedy	a.k.a. Leute gibt's
Wings of Night	Hans Noever	Christine Boisson, Michael König, Armin Mueller-Stahl	Science fiction	
Wir haben uns doch mal geliebt	Daniel Christoff	Lisa Kreuzer, Joachim Bliese	Drama	
Wohl bekomm's	Rolf von Sydow	Karl-Heinz Vosgerau, Wolfgang Kieling, Loni von Friedl	Comedy	a.k.a. À vos souhaits
Woman with the Red Hat	Tatsumi Kumashiro	Kristina van Eyck, Toshiyuki Nagashima, Shigeru Izumiya	Drama	Japanese-West German co-production
Die Zeit dazwischen	Klaus Weise	Ulla Berkéwicz, Karl-Heinz von Hassel, Alfred Edel, Magdalena Montezuma	Crime comedy	
Zero Point	Jochen Richter	Victoria Tennant, Hans Peter Hallwachs, James Faulkner, Heinz Trixner	Crime	a.k.a. Nullpunkt – Ich bin dein Killer
Der Zubringer	Horst Flick	Hans Peter Korff, Gerd Baltus, Witta Pohl	Comedy	

== 1983 ==
Title	Director	Cast	Genre	Notes
The Abduction of the Sabine Women	Rolf von Sydow	Gert Fröbe, Martin Held, Edda Seippel, Désirée Nosbusch	Comedy	a.k.a. Der Raub der Sabinerinnen
Abschiedsbilder	Nico Hofmann	Martin Baumgärtner	Drama	
Alleingang	Egon Werdin	Gerd Silberbauer	Crime	
Altosax	Karl Walter Lindenlaub, Thomas Merker	Barbara Rudnik, Roland Emmerich	Music, Drama	
Die andere Seite der Welt	Hanno Brühl	Hildegard Lena Kuhlenberg	Drama	a.k.a. Out of Sight, Out of Mind
Angst vor dem Leben	Hagen Mueller-Stahl	Hilmar Thate, Hannelore Hoger, Heinz Hoenig	Drama	
Banks and Robbers	Rolf Silber	Christoph M. Ohrt, Britta Pohland, Kai Fischer, Tilo Prückner	Comedy	a.k.a. Kassensturz
Die Beine des Elefanten	Michael Günther	Viyada Umarin, Gerhard Olschewski, Reinhard Kolldehoff	Drama	
Bella Donna	Peter Keglevic	Krystyna Janda, Erland Josephson, Friedrich-Karl Praetorius, Brigitte Horney	Drama	Screened at the 1983 Cannes Film Festival
Bergpredigt	Rolf Hädrich	Stefan Schnabel, Emil Stöhr	Drama	
Bolero	Rüdiger Nüchtern	Michael König, Katja Rupé, Paul Hubschmid	Drama	
Burning Patience	Antonio Skármeta	Óscar Castro Ramírez, Roberto Parada, Marcela Osorio	Comedy	West German-Portuguese co-production
The Captain's Doll	Claude Whatham	Jeremy Irons, Gila von Weitershausen, Jane Lapotaire, Leigh Lawson, Ivan Desny, Sheila Ruskin, Michael Sheard	Drama	British-West German co-production
Cats' Play	István Szabó	Maria Becker, Helmut Qualtinger, Joana Maria Gorvin, Jane Tilden	Drama	a.k.a. Cat's Game a.k.a. Catsplay
Chained Heat	Paul Nicholas	Linda Blair, Sybil Danning, Stella Stevens	Exploitation	West German-American co-production
City of Lost Souls	Rosa von Praunheim	Jayne County, Angie Stardust, Joaquín La Habana	Musical	
Class Enemy	Peter Stein	Udo Samel, Stefan Reck, Tayfun Bademsoy, Ernst Stötzner	Drama	
Closed Circuit	Rudolf Thome	Bruno Ganz, Hanns Zischler, Dominique Laffin	Crime drama	a.k.a. System Without Shadow
Danni	Martin Gies	Brigitte Karner, Robert Hunger-Bühler	Thriller	
Datenpanne – Das kann uns nie passieren	Daniel Christoff	Wolfgang Bathke, Gudo Hoegel, Alexandra Bogojevic, Gerd Böckmann	Science fiction	
Dear Melanie	Michael Verhoeven	Melanie Horeschowsky, Senta Berger, Friedrich von Thun, Michael Ande, Eva Mattes, Ulrich Tukur	Drama	
Deep Water	Franz Peter Wirth	Constanze Engelbrecht, Peter Bongartz, Sky du Mont, Raimund Harmstorf, Robert Atzorn	Thriller	
Dies rigorose Leben	Vadim Glowna	Ángela Molina, Jerzy Radziwiłowicz, Viveca Lindfors, Vera Tschechowa	Drama	a.k.a. Nothing Left to Lose. Entered into the 33rd Berlin International Film Festival
Un dimanche de flic	Michel Vianey	Jean Rochefort, Victor Lanoux, Barbara Sukowa, Armin Mueller-Stahl	Crime	French-West German co-production
Dingo	Ilse Hofmann	Hilmar Thate, Katrin Schaake, Eric Oldfield, Desmond Tester	Drama	
Due to an Act of God	Rainer Boldt	Karl-Heinz von Hassel, Gunnar Möller, Hermann Lause	Disaster	a.k.a. In the Sign of the Cross
The Ear	Pavel Kohout	Joachim Bißmeier, Gertraud Jesserer	Drama	Remake of The Ear (1969)
The Edge of Darkness	Jochen Richter	Barbara Rudnik, Hans Peter Hallwachs	Drama	a.k.a. Am Ufer der Dämmerung
Edith's Diary	Hans W. Geißendörfer	Angela Winkler, Vadim Glowna	Drama	
Der Eimer und die Mona Lisa	Joachim Roering	Joost Siedhoff, Hans Korte, Werner Schneyder, Karl Michael Vogler, Claudia Wedekind	Comedy	
Einmal die Woche	Horst Flick	Marie-Luise Marjan, Udo Thomer, Bettina Redlich, Michael Roll, Dominique Horwitz	Comedy	
Embers	Thomas Koerfer	Armin Mueller-Stahl, Katharina Thalbach, Krystyna Janda, Matthias Habich, Sigfrit Steiner	Drama	a.k.a. Glut. Swiss-West German co-production
Empfänger unbekannt	Sohrab Shahid-Saless	Umran Ertok, Iris von Reppert-Bismarck, Manfred Zapatka	Drama	a.k.a. Addressee Unknown
Ente oder Trente	Rigo Manikofski	Gottfried John	Drama	
Enter a Free Man	Michael Günther	Heinz Schubert, Ursela Monn, Simone Rethel, Tommi Piper, Margret Homeyer	Drama	a.k.a. Der Spleen des George Riley
Eréndira	Ruy Guerra	Irene Papas, Cláudia Ohana, Michael Lonsdale	Drama	Mexican-French-West German co-production
Es gibt noch Haselnußsträucher	Vojtěch Jasný	Heinz Rühmann, Katharina Böhm	Drama	a.k.a. Il y a encore des noisetiers
Frau Juliane Winkler	Michael Günther	Inge Meysel, Axel von Ambesser, Wolfgang Wahl	Comedy	
Für'n Groschen Brause	Eberhard Itzenplitz	Bernd Benneck	Drama	
The Garden	Wolfgang Liebeneiner	Elisabeth Bergner, Gert Fröbe	Drama	
Gefährliches Spiel	Theo Mezger	Helmut Zierl, Simone Rethel, Tommi Piper	Drama, Sport	
Geheimsender 1212	Rudolf Nussgruber	Michael Hinz, Dietrich Mattausch, Karl-Heinz von Liebezeit, Helen Vita	War, Docudrama	a.k.a. Radio 1212
Gib Gas – Ich will Spass	Wolfgang Büld	Nena, Markus, Karl Dall	Musical comedy	a.k.a. Gib Gas – Ich will Spaß a.k.a. Hangin' Out
The Gin Game	Tom Toelle	Klaus Schwarzkopf, Edda Seippel	Drama	a.k.a. Gin-Rommé
Grenzenlos	Josef Rödl	Therese Affolter	Drama	
Die große Kapitulation	Wolfgang F. Henschel	Arthur Brauss, Ernst Stankovski, Volkert Kraeft	Drama	a.k.a. Die große Kapitulation – Vom unrühmlichen Ende des Fernsehmagazins "Offene Welle"
Hanna von acht bis acht	Egon Günther	Angelica Domröse, Karl Michael Vogler, Heidi Brühl, Lisa Kreuzer, Claus Theo Gärtner, Christoph Eichhorn, Anja Jaenicke	Drama	
Hauptsache Leben	Diethard Klante	Franziska Walser, Lambert Hamel, Philip Arp	Drama	
The Heartbreakers	Peter F. Bringmann	Maria Ketikidou, Sascha Disselkamp, Uwe Bohm	Musical	
Heimat, die ich meine	Peter Beauvais	Maria Wachowiak, Edwin Marian	Drama	
Heinrich Heine – Die zweite Vertreibung aus dem Paradies	Karl Fruchtmann	Wolfgang Hinze, Donata Höffer, Sabine Sinjen	Biography	
Heinrich Penthesilea von Kleist	Hans Neuenfels	Elisabeth Trissenaar, Hermann Treusch	Drama	
Hell in Frauensee	Wolfgang Panzer	Alan Jones, Yolande Folliot	Comedy	West German-French-Italian co-production
Herrenjahre	Axel Corti	Peter Simonischek, Josefin Platt	Drama	Austrian-West German co-production
How Would You Like to Have It?	Rolf von Sydow	Jutta Speidel, Robert Atzorn, Michaela May, Horst Janson, Günther Maria Halmer, Herbert Herrmann	Comedy	
Hostage	Frank Shields	Kerry Mack, Ralph Schicha, Gabrielle Barraket, Judy Nunn, Henk Johanne, Doris Goddard, Clare Binney	Drama, Thriller	a.k.a. Savage Attraction a.k.a. Hölle der Gewalt. Australian-West German co-production
In den Tod – Hurra!	Helmut Kopetzky	Martin Hoppe, Gerhard Bös, Friedrich G. Beckhaus	War, Docudrama	a.k.a. In den Tod – Hurra! Deutsche Jugend vor Langemarck 1914
In Zeiten wie diesen	Wolfgang Bauer	Towje Kleiner	Comedy	Austrian-West German co-production
Inflation im Paradies	Nikolai Müllerschön, Richard L. Wagner, Susanne Blänkner, Wolfgang Rühl	Anja Schüte, Ian Moorse, Christine Kaufmann, Karlheinz Böhm	Anthology	
Innige Verbundenheit	Maria Neocleous	Eva-Maria Hagen, Sabine Kaack	Drama	
The Island of the Bloody Plantation	Kurt Raab	Udo Kier, Barbara Valentin, Karl-Otto Alberty	Adventure, Horror	a.k.a. Escape from Blood Plantation a.k.a. Prison Camp Girls. West German-Filipino co-production
Joseph's Daughter	Gustav Ehmck	Linda Manz, Marie-Christine Barrault, Ana Torrent	Drama	West German-Spanish co-production
Joyride	Manfred Stelzer	Rolf Zacher, Iris Berben, George Meyer-Goll, Harald Henschel-Franzmann	Crime comedy	a.k.a. Bootleg Driver a.k.a. Midnight Blues a.k.a. Schwarzfahrer
Julie Darling	Paul Nicholas	Anthony Franciosa, Sybil Danning, Isabelle Mejias, Reinhard Kolldehoff	Thriller	a.k.a. Daughter of Death. West German-Canadian co-production
Kampftag	Manfred Grunert	Siegfried Rauch, Josef Bierbichler, Monika Baumgartner	Drama	
Kehraus	Hanns Christian Müller	Gerhard Polt, Gisela Schneeberger, Dieter Hildebrandt, Jochen Busse, Nikolaus Paryla	Comedy	
Kiez	Walter Bockmayer, Rolf Bührmann	Wolf-Dietrich Sprenger, Katja Rupé	Drama	
Kinder unseres Volkes	Stephan Rinser	Leslie Malton, Peter Seum, Witta Pohl, Dietmar Schönherr, Günter Strack, Alexander May	Drama	
Klawitter	Günter Gräwert	Gerhard Olschewski, Dieter Kirchlechner, Rosel Zech	Drama	
Der Kleine	Klaus Lemke	Arthur Radwan, Micha Lampert, Isa Jank	Crime	
Der Kunstfehler	Peter Beauvais	Winfried Glatzeder, Thekla Carola Wied	Drama	
Die leichten Zeiten sind vorbei	Ulli Weiß	Heinz Hoenig, Jan Fedder, Kristina van Eyck	Drama	
Leuchtturm des Chaos	Wolf-Eckart Bühler, Manfred Blank	Sterling Hayden	Documentary	a.k.a. Pharos of Chaos
A Love in Germany	Andrzej Wajda	Hanna Schygulla, Piotr Łysak, Armin Mueller-Stahl, Daniel Olbrychski, Bernhard Wicki	Drama, War	West German-French co-production
Magdalena	Jörg Graser	Andrea Wildner, Franz Xaver Kroetz, Fritz Straßner	Drama	
Marianne und Sophie	Rainer Söhnlein	Marianne Hoppe, Sofie Keeser	Comedy, Road movie	a.k.a. Marianne und Sofie
Martin Luther	Rainer Wolffhardt	Lambert Hamel, Ernst Fritz Fürbringer, Jörg Pleva, Klaus Grünberg, Dieter Pfaff	Biography	
Die Matrosen von Kronstadt	Jürgen Karl Klauß	Siemen Rühaak, Gottfried John, Pinkas Braun, Gert Haucke, Dietrich Mattausch, Werner Kreindl, Jacques Breuer	History	a.k.a. The Sailors of Kronstadt
The Mayfly and the Frog	Thomas Engel	Heinz Baumann, Ute Christensen	Comedy	a.k.a. Der Frosch und die Eintagsfliege
Melzer	Heinz Bütler	Rüdiger Vogler, Adelheid Arndt	Drama	Swiss-West German co-production
Mensch Berni	Joachim Hess	Christian Kohlund, Peer Augustinski, Hans Richter	Drama	
Milo Barus, the Strongest Man in the World	Henning Stegmüller	Günter Lamprecht	Biography	
Das Mikado Projekt	Torsten Emrich	Torsten Emrich, Eddie Constantine	Crime comedy	
The Model Husband	Wolfgang Liebeneiner	Harald Juhnke, Grit Boettcher, Harald Leipnitz	Comedy	a.k.a. Fair and Warmer
Mondkräcker	Marco Serafini	Willi Kowalj, Thomas Schücke	Comedy, Science fiction	
Ein Mord liegt auf der Hand	Ralf Gregan	Uwe Friedrichsen, Brigitte Horney, Rudolf Platte, Harald Leipnitz	Crime comedy	a.k.a. An Obvious Murder. Based on Lord Arthur Savile's Crime
Nachruf auf Othello	Michael Braun	Werner Hinz, Herbert Fleischmann, Barbara Rütting, Dietlinde Turban, Jörg Pleva	Crime	
Nebelland	Claudia von Alemann	Brigitte Röttgers, Grant Johnson, Jean Badin, Eos Schopohl, Matthias Beltz, Denise Péron	Drama	
Non-Stop Trouble with Spies	Ottokar Runze	Dieter Hallervorden, Catherine Alric, Anton Diffring, Carl Duering, Tilo Prückner, Eddie Constantine, Charles Régnier, Siegfried Wischnewski, Gustl Bayrhammer, Peter Kuiper	Spy comedy	a.k.a. Der Schnüffler
The Oppermanns	Egon Monk	Wolfgang Kieling, Rosel Zech, Michael Degen	Drama	a.k.a. Oppermann Family
Pankow '95	Gábor Altorjay	Udo Kier, Christine Kaufmann, Magdalena Montezuma, Dieter Thomas Heck, Nina Hagen	Science fiction	
Peppermint Peace	Marianne Rosenbaum	Peter Fonda, Cleo Kretschmer, Konstantin Wecker, Hans Brenner, Saskia Tyroller	Drama	a.k.a. Peppermint Freedom
Die Pfauen	Berthold Mittermayr	Wolfgang Büttner, Elisabeth Stepanek, Ellen Frank	Drama	
Der Platzanweiser	Peter Gehrig	Ulrich Schamoni, Peter Lilienthal, Hans-Jürgen Syberberg, Hans W. Geißendörfer, Enno Patalas, Marthe Keller	Mockumentary	a.k.a. Der Platzanweiser – Porträt eines Kinomanen
Point Hope	Wolfgang Panzer	Hans Heinz Moser, Gisela Weilemann	Drama	
The Power of Emotion	Alexander Kluge	Hannelore Hoger, Alexandra Kluge	Drama	a.k.a. The Power of Feelings a.k.a. Die Macht der Gefühle
Randale	Manfred Purzer	Angelica Domröse, Jocelyne Boisseau	Drama	a.k.a. Girls Riot
Red Lights	Wolfgang Storch	Bernd Tauber	Thriller	a.k.a. The Hitchhiker a.k.a. Feux Rouges a.k.a. Reifenwechsel
The Road into the Open	Karin Brandauer	Klaus Maria Brandauer, Krista Posch, Hans Clarin	Drama	Austrian-West German co-production
The Roaring Fifties	Peter Zadek	Juraj Kukura, Boy Gobert, Peter Kern, Sunnyi Melles, Christine Kaufmann, Freddy Quinn, Eva Mattes, Willy Millowitsch, Ilja Richter, Ingrid Caven, Brigitte Mira, Ivan Desny	Comedy	
Die Roppenheimer Sau	Eberhard Itzenplitz	Gérard Buhr, Helmut Zierl	War, Comedy	
Die Rückkehr der Träume	Renke Korn	George Meyer-Goll, Hilde Lermann, Monika Lundi, Tommi Piper	Drama	
Ruhe sanft, Bruno	Hajo Gies	Armin Mueller-Stahl, Constanze Engelbrecht, Wolf-Dietrich Sprenger	Spy comedy	
The Sandman	Dagmar Damek	Christoph Waltz, Rudolf Schündler, Irina Wanka, Claus Eberth	Mystery	
Schnelles Geld	Renate Stegmüller, Raimund Koplin	Carlo Ghirardelli, Agnes Dünneisen, Udo Samel	Crime	
Sheer Madness	Margarethe von Trotta	Hanna Schygulla, Angela Winkler, Peter Striebeck	Drama	West German-French co-production. Entered into the 33rd Berlin International Film Festival
Solo Run	Wolfgang Staudte	Dieter Kirchlechner, Hannelore Elsner, Hans Christian Blech, Wolfgang Kieling	Drama	a.k.a. Satan ist auf Gottes Seite
Sorry	Thomas Engel	Jutta Speidel, Eva Ingeborg Scholz, Knut Koch, Peter Schiff	Drama	
Die Spider Murphy Gang	Georg Kostya	Spider Murphy Gang	Musical	
Spring Symphony	Peter Schamoni	Nastassja Kinski, Herbert Grönemeyer, Rolf Hoppe, Bernhard Wicki, André Heller	Biography, Music	
Stadtliebe	Hanna Laura Klar	Michael Abendroth, Pola Kinski	Drama	
Stau	Ulrich Limmer	Vitus Zeplichal	Drama	
Der Stille Ozean	Xaver Schwarzenberger	Hanno Pöschl, Marie-France Pisier	Drama	a.k.a. The Silent Ocean. Austrian-West German co-production
Strafanzeige gegen Unbeteiligt	Jürgen Haase	Wolfgang Kieling, Werner Kreindl	Drama	
Straight Through the Heart	Doris Dörrie	Beate Jensen, Josef Bierbichler	Drama	
Strange Fruits	Tankred Dorst	Gerhard Olschewski, Hannelore Hoger, Susanne Lothar, Hans-Michael Rehberg	Drama	a.k.a. Eisenhans
Sunshine Reggae in Ibiza	Franz Marischka	Karl Dall, Gottlieb Wendehals, Olivia Pascal	Comedy	
Die Supernasen	Dieter Pröttel	Thomas Gottschalk, Mike Krüger	Comedy	
The Swing	Percy Adlon	Anja Jaenicke, Lena Stolze, Christine Kaufmann	Drama	
Sydney an der Wupper – Dreamtime	Bettina Woernle	Meryl Tankard	Documentary, Music	
Tage im Hotel	Ulrich Stein	Rolf Witt, Rebecca Pauly, Maja Maranow	Drama	a.k.a. Cold Skin
The Thing at the Door	Wolf Gremm	Martin Semmelrogge, Rita Kail, Harry Baer, Marie-Charlott Schüler, Brigitte Mira	Thriller	a.k.a. Death Comes Through the Door a.k.a. Behind The Door
Tiritomba	Ulrich Heising	Michele Oliveri, Hanno Pöschl, Bernd Tauber, Christa Berndl	Drama	a.k.a. Spaghetti Two-Step
The Train Killer	Sándor Simó	Michael Sarrazin, Armin Mueller-Stahl, Towje Kleiner, Constanze Engelbrecht, Teri Tordai, Róbert Koltai, János Derzsi, Dorottya Udvaros	Crime, Historical drama	a.k.a. The Case of Szilveszter Matuska. Hungarian-West German-American co-production
Tramps	Peter Patzak	Elliott Gould, Heinz Moog, Andrea Jonasson	Drama	Austrian-West German co-production
Trap for a Lonely Man	Oswald Döpke	Wolf Roth, Judy Winter, Helmut Zierl, Hans Caninenberg	Thriller	a.k.a. Die Falle
Traumlage	Konrad Sabrautzky	Karin Baal, Richard Haller, Ilse Neubauer	Drama	
Trotzdem	Jörg Grünler	Angelika Bender, Wolfgang Schenck	Drama	
Der Tunnel	Wilm ten Haaf	Max Volkert Martens, Eva Kotthaus, Ludwig Thiesen, Bernd Hoffmann	Comedy	
Unternehmen Arche Noah	Konrad Sabrautzky	Karin Baal, Fritz Lichtenhahn, Paul Dahlke, Dagmar Biener	Comedy	
Utopia	Sohrab Shahid-Saless	Manfred Zapatka, Birgit Anders, Gundula Petrovska, Johanna Sophia, Imke Barnstedt, Gabriele Fischer	Drama	Entered into the 33rd Berlin International Film Festival
Variation	Michael Haneke	Hilmar Thate, Elfriede Irrall	Drama	
Vom anderen Stern	Petra Haffter	Julia Lindig, Claude-Oliver Rudolph	Science fiction	
Wer raucht die Letzte?	Hartmut Griesmayr	Manfred Krug, Ingrid van Bergen, Dieter Kirchlechner, Anita Lochner, Monika Lundi, Matthias Ponnier, Udo Vioff, Klaus Herm	Drama	
White Star	Roland Klick	Dennis Hopper, Terrance Robay, David Hess	Drama, Music	a.k.a. Let It Rock
White Trash	Uwe Schrader	Peter Franke, Brigitte Janner, Gerhard Olschewski	Drama	
Why Am I So Happy?	Michael Kehlmann	Karlheinz Hackl, Vilma Degischer, Alexander Kerst, Klausjürgen Wussow, Gertraud Jesserer	War, Drama	a.k.a. Mich wundert, daß ich so fröhlich bin. Austrian-West German co-production
Wie es geschah	Thomas Engel	Jutta Speidel, Reinhild Solf	Drama	
Wie war das damals?	Thomas Engel	Inge Meysel, Cordula Trantow	Drama	
A Winter in Majorca	Imo Moszkowicz	Eleonore Weisgerber, Krystian Martinek, Anton Diffring	Biography	a.k.a. A Winter in Mallorca
A Woman in Flames	Robert van Ackeren	Gudrun Landgrebe, Mathieu Carrière, Hanns Zischler	Drama	a.k.a. Die flambierte Frau
Zausel	Peter Schulze-Rohr	Werner Hinz	Drama	
Zeig' was du kannst	Imo Moszkowicz	Sigmar Solbach, Susanne Uhlen, Martin Halm, Heinz Baumann, Elisabeth Wiedemann, Helga Feddersen	Comedy	a.k.a. Come Blow Your Horn
Eine Zeitlang, es war in Rom, dachte er nur an schneebedeckte Felder	Erwin Michelberger	Wolfgang Höper	Drama	
Ziemlich weit weg	Dietrich Schubert	Burghart Klaußner, Christiane Lemm, Wolfgang Kraßnitzer	Drama	
Zuckerhut	Vivian Naefe	Despina Pajanou	Comedy	
Zwei Tote im Sender und Don Carlos im PoGl	Joachim Roering	Claus Biederstaedt, Ruth Maria Kubitschek, Heinz Ehrenfreund, Peter Pasetti, Jürgen von Manger, Alexander May, Brigitte Mira	Comedy	
Die zweite Frau	Herbert Ballmann	Christoph Moosbrugger, Ruth Olafs, Paul Dahlke, Hartmut Becker, Doris Kunstmann, Luitgard Im, Gisela Uhlen, Rainer Hunold	Drama	
Der Zappler	Wolfram Deutschmann	Karsten Kunitz, Monica Bleibtreu	Drama	

== 1984 ==
Title	Director	Cast	Genre	Notes
Abenteuer aus dem Englischen Garten	Margit Saad	Werner Stocker, Silvia Janisch	Drama	
Abwärts	Carl Schenkel	Götz George, Renée Soutendijk, Wolfgang Kieling, Hannes Jaenicke	Thriller	a.k.a. Out of Order
After Your Decrees	Jerzy Hoffman	Sharon Brauner, Anna Dymna, Günter Lamprecht, Mathieu Carrière	War	a.k.a. Ruth. Polish-West German co-production
Al Kruger	Volker Vogeler	Lex Goudsmit, Richy Müller	Drama	
Kellermanns Prozeß	Theodor Kotulla	Henry van Lyck, Anja Jaenicke	Drama	a.k.a. Kellermanns Prozess
Among the Cinders	Rolf Hädrich	Paul O'Shea, Derek Hardwick	Drama	a.k.a. Und er nahm mich bei der Hand. New Zealand-West-German co-production
Anna's Mother	Burkhard Driest	Gudrun Landgrebe	Drama	
Auf einem langen Weg	Christian Görlitz	Nils Viktor Sorge, Mark Heine	War	
Augustus the Strong	Rudolf Nussgruber	Gert Fröbe, Herlinde Latzko, Evelyn Opela, Anja Schüte, Hannes Messemer, Günter Strack	Biography, Docudrama, History	a.k.a. August der Starke
Der Ausflug	Otto Schnelling	Alina De Simone, Gert Haucke, Gerhard Olschewski	Drama	
Das Autogramm	Peter Lilienthal	Juan José Mosalini	Drama	a.k.a. The Autograph. Entered into the 34th Berlin International Film Festival
Baby	Uwe Frießner	Udo Seidler, Volkmar Richter, Reinhard Seeger	Crime	
Bali	István Szabó	Winfried Glatzeder, Loni von Friedl, Michael König, Nicole Heesters, Béla Ernyey, Volkert Kraeft	Drama	
Ballad of the Little Soldier	Werner Herzog		Documentary	
The Bear	Don Askarian	Hans Peter Hallwachs, Elisabeth Rath	Comedy	
Beautiful Wilhelmine	Rolf von Sydow	Anja Kruse, Rainer Hunold	Biography	
Bis später, ich muss mich erschießen	Vojtěch Jasný	Daniel Olbrychski, Marina Vlady, Risto Aaltonen, Soila Komi, Relja Bašić, Pavel Landovský	Comedy	West German-Finnish co-production
Bluebeard	Krzysztof Zanussi	Vadim Glowna, Karin Baal, Vera Tschechowa, Margarethe von Trotta, Elisabeth Trissenaar, Barbara Lass	Drama	
The Broken House: Growing Up Under Hitler	Michael Günther	Till Topf, Ursela Monn, Manuel Vaessen, Sona MacDonald, Klaus Höhne, Hans Caninenberg, Hans Helmut Dickow, Hannes Messemer	Drama, War	a.k.a. A Crack in the Wall: Growing Up Under Hitler
Cheaters	Barbet Schroeder	Jacques Dutronc, Bulle Ogier, Kurt Raab	Drama	French-West German-Portuguese co-production
Chinese Boxes	Chris Petit	Will Patton, Robbie Coltrane, Adelheid Arndt, Gottfried John, Beate Jensen	Thriller	British-West German co-production
Code Name: Wild Geese	Antonio Margheriti	Lewis Collins, Lee Van Cleef, Ernest Borgnine, Klaus Kinski, Mimsy Farmer	Action	Italian-West German co-production
Cold Fever	Josef Rusnak	Klaus Rohrmoser, Lisa Kreuzer, Hans-Michael Rehberg, Katharina Böhm	Crime	
Dear Karl	Maria Knilli	Ulrich Reinthaller, Hans Brenner, Krista Stadler	Drama	Austrian-West German co-production
Decoder	Muscha	F.M. Einheit, William "Bill" Rice, Christiane F., William S. Burroughs	Science fiction, Music	
Déjà Vu	Jörg Bundschuh, Christian Bauer	Robert Atzorn	Drama	a.k.a. Déjà Vu oder Die gebändigte Geliebte
Deutschlandlied	Ernst Witzel	Bernd Herzsprung, Hans Hass Jr., Isolde Barth	Drama	
Deutschland-Tournee	Berengar Pfahl	Ulrike Kriener, Verena Plangger	Comedy	
The Devil's Lieutenant	John Goldschmidt	Helmut Griem, Ian Charleson, Barbara De Rossi, Claudine Auger	Drama	British-West German-Italian-French co-production
Don Carlos	Franz Peter Wirth	Jacques Breuer, Robert Atzorn, Rolf Boysen, Marita Marschall, Bernhard Minetti, Rolf Becker, Renan Demirkan	Drama	
Donauwalzer	Xaver Schwarzenberger	Christiane Hörbiger, Hans-Michael Rehberg	Drama	Austrian-West German co-production
Dorado – One Way	Reinhard Münster	Uwe Schwalbe, Adriana Altaras, Dominik Bender, Uwe Büschken	Comedy	
Dorian Gray in the Mirror of the Yellow Press	Ulrike Ottinger	Veruschka von Lehndorff, Delphine Seyrig	Drama	a.k.a. The Image of Dorian Gray in the Yellow Press
End of the World	Imo Moszkowicz	Günter Mack, Hans von Borsody, Anton Diffring	Historical drama	a.k.a. Weltuntergang. Austrian-West German co-production
Die ewigen Gefühle	Peter Beauvais	Michael Degen, Christine Merthan, Gila von Weitershausen, Renate Krößner, Rolf Hoppe, Jörg Gudzuhn, Rolf Ludwig, Herbert Grönemeyer	Drama	
Faces in the Dark	Kristian Kühn	Wolfgang Wahl, Monica Bleibtreu, Wolf-Dietrich Berg, Jürgen Schmidt	Thriller	
Die Familie oder Schroffenstein	Hans Neuenfels	Angela Schanelec, René Hofschneider, Ulrich Wildgruber, Hermann Treusch, Sabine Sinjen, Annemarie Düringer	Drama	
Fanny Morgane	Klaus Ickert	Barbara Rudnik, Rüdiger Vogler	Drama	a.k.a. Fanny Morgane oder Irgendwie muß das Glück ja heißen
Fear of Falling	Christian Rischert	Horst Buchholz, Franziska Bronnen, Tilo Prückner, Constanze Engelbrecht	Drama	a.k.a. Wenn ich mich fürchte
Fire for the Big Dragon	Eberhard Itzenplitz	Peter Sattmann, Ulrike Luderer, Erdal Merdan, Tayfun Bademsoy	Drama	a.k.a. Feuer für den großen Drachen
Flight to Berlin	Chris Petit	Tusse Silberg, Paul Freeman, Lisa Kreuzer, Jean-François Stévenin, Eddie Constantine	Drama	a.k.a. Fluchtpunkt Berlin. British-West German co-production
Forbidden	Anthony Page	Jacqueline Bisset, Jürgen Prochnow	Drama, War	West German-British co-production
Die Försterbuben	Peter Patzak	Franco Nero, Tilo Prückner, Georg Friedrich, Thomas Sigwald, Anja Jaenicke, Heinz Moog	Drama	a.k.a. The Forester's Sons. Austrian-West German co-production
Die Frau des Kommissars	Michael Günther	Heinz Schubert, Ursela Monn, Klaus Höhne, Simone Rethel, Claus Biederstaedt, Ilja Richter	Comedy	a.k.a. La Femme du Commissaire
Die Friedenmacher	Stanislav Barabáš	Richard Münch, Friedrich G. Beckhaus, Walter Schmidinger, Günter Mack, Paul Edwin Roth, Hans Peter Korff, Gerhard Olschewski	History	a.k.a. The Peacemakers: The Munich Agreement
Führer durch die Welt	Heiko Schier	Agnes Dünneisen, Peter Sattmann	Drama	
The Future of Emily	Helma Sanders-Brahms	Brigitte Fossey, Hildegard Knef, Ivan Desny	Drama	a.k.a. Flügel und Fesseln. West German-French co-production
Gefühlssachen	Klaus Ickert	Vera Tschechowa, Gabriel Barylli	Drama	
Gegenlicht	Michael Kehlmann	Karlheinz Hackl, Günter Mack, Dagmar Mettler, Kurt Nachmann, Gregor Schönstein	Thriller	Austrian-West German co-production
Das Geschenk	Marcus Scholz	Inge Meysel, Marion Kracht, Wolfgang Kieling	Drama	
Gnadenlos	Wolfgang Panzer	Birgit Doll, Rüdiger Vogler, Günter Lamprecht, Winfried Glatzeder	Drama	
Gratwanderung	Barbara Kappen	Irina Hoppe, Petra Seeger, Anneli Feik-Wagner, Michael Altmann	Drama	a.k.a. On the Edge
Haus Excelsior	Nenad Djapic	Alejandro Quintana Contreras	Drama	
Haus im Süden	Sebastian C. Schroeder	Joachim Dietmar Mues, Christine Wodetzky, Anne-Marie Blanc, Ernst Schröder	Comedy	Swiss-West German-Austrian co-production
Heimat	Edgar Reitz	Marita Breuer, Jörg Hube, Kurt Wagner, Michael Lesch, Gudrun Landgrebe	Drama	TV series
Heiraten ist immer ein Risiko	Hans-Jürgen Tögel	Carl-Heinz Schroth, Edda Seippel, Willy Semmelrogge	Crime comedy	a.k.a. Risky Marriage
Hildes Endspiel	Franz Peter Wirth	Lisa Fitz, Günther Maria Halmer	Comedy	
Horror Vacui	Rosa von Praunheim	Lotti Huber, Ingrid van Bergen	Drama	
House Guest	Jürgen Roland	Horst Frank, Judy Winter, Jürgen Goslar, Anton Diffring, Evelyn Opela, Diana Körner	Thriller	a.k.a. Der Besuch
Hur und heilig	Cornelia Schlingmann	Isolde Barth, Udo Kier	Drama	
Ich liebe dich, Juli	Karl Heinz Deickert	Ingeborg Lapsien	Comedy	
An Ideal Husband	Hans Jaray	Axel von Ambesser, Andrea Jonasson, Michael Heltau, Klaus Wildbolz	Comedy	West German-Austrian co-production
Im Himmel ist die Hölle los	Helmer von Lützelburg	Billie Zöckler, Dirk Bach, Barbara Valentin, Cleo Kretschmer	Comedy	
Jagger und Spaghetti	Karsten Wichniarz	Stephan Schwartz, Peter Buchholz	Crime comedy	a.k.a. Jagger & Spaghetti
Julius geht nach Amerika	Hans Noever	Hanno Pöschl, Gabi Marr, Silvia Janisch	Drama	
Jungle Warriors	Ernst R. von Theumer	Nina Van Pallandt, Sybil Danning, Woody Strode, Alex Cord, Paul L. Smith, John Vernon	Exploitation	
Kerbel's Escape	Erwin Keusch	Peter Sattmann, Barbara Rudnik, Jan Niklas, Bernd Tauber	Drama	
A Kind of Anger	Uli Edel	Rolf Zacher, Klaus Löwitsch, Hannelore Elsner, Bernhard Wicki	Thriller	
Klassenverhältnisse	Straub-Huillet	Christian Heinisch, Mario Adorf, Laura Betti	Drama	a.k.a. Class Relations. West German-French co-production
Knock on the Wrong Door	Gabriela Zerhau	Claudia Demarmels, Rolf Zacher, August Zirner, Iris Berben	Comedy	a.k.a. Tapetenwechsel
Kolossale Liebe	Jutta Brückner	Kirsten Dene, Richard Münch	Biography	
Kolp	Roland Suso Richter	Frank Röth, Katja Flint, Ottfried Fischer, Heiner Lauterbach, Charles M. Huber	Crime	
Kornelia	Wilm ten Haaf	Ruth Maria Kubitschek, Hans Caninenberg, Klaus Höhne	Comedy	a.k.a. Clic-Clac
Ein Kriegsende	Volker Vogeler	Rüdiger Kirschstein	War	
The Last Civilian	Laurent Heynemann	Max von Sydow, Thomas Schücke, Pascale Rocard, Günther Maria Halmer, Mathieu Carrière	Drama	French-West German co-production
Lenin in Zürich	Rolf Busch	Wolf-Dietrich Berg, Hans Christian Blech	History, Biography	
Lettow-Vorbeck: Der deutsch-ostafrikanische Imperativ	Christian Doermer	Christian Doermer	War, Biography	
Love Is Not an Argument	Marianne Lüdcke	Erika Pluhar, Friedrich-Karl Praetorius, Günter Lamprecht, Nina Hoger, Heinz Schubert, Karin Baal	Drama	
Love Is the Beginning of All Terror	Helke Sander	Helke Sander, Lou Castel, Rebecca Pauly	Comedy	
The Lufthansa Heist	Wolfgang Storch	Peter Bongartz, Christian Brückner, Günther Maria Halmer, Grażyna Dyląg	Crime	a.k.a. The Million Dollar Hijack
Mama Mia – Don't Panic	Dieter Pröttel	Uschi Glas, Thomas Gottschalk, Helmut Fischer	Romantic comedy	
A Man Like E.V.A.	Radu Gabrea	Eva Mattes, Werner Stocker, Lisa Kreuzer, Charles Régnier, Charles M. Huber	Biography	
Man Under Suspicion	Norbert Kückelmann	Maximilian Schell, Lena Stolze, Wolfgang Kieling	Crime	a.k.a. Morgen in Alabama. Won the Silver Bear at Berlin
Man Without Memory	Kurt Gloor	Michael König, Lisi Mangold, Hannelore Elsner	Drama	Swiss-West German co-production
Ein Mann namens Parvus	Rudolf Nussgruber	Günter Lamprecht, Constanze Engelbrecht, Wolfgang Preiss, Iris Berben, Wolf-Dietrich Berg	History, Docudrama	
Manuel	Peter Obrist	Kai Buth, Eva Renzi, Karl-Heinz von Hassel, Elisabeth Volkmann	Drama	a.k.a. Jäger des Herzens
Marlene	Maximilian Schell		Documentary	
Mascha	Hans-Eberhard Quelle	Rosel Zech	Drama	
Meeting Place at Infinity	Heinrich Breloer, Horst Königstein	Till Topf, Angelika Thomas, Vera Tschechowa	Biography	a.k.a. Meeting Point in Infinity a.k.a. Rendezvous in Infinity
Mensch ohne Fahrschein	Alfred Weidenmann	Werner Hinz	Comedy	
Der Mörder	Anton Reitzenstein	Dietrich Siegl, Laura Morante, Philippe Leroy, Ivan Desny, Fritz Muliar, Marisa Mell, Robert Hoffmann	Crime	a.k.a. The Murderer. Austrian-Italian-West German co-production
Morgengrauen	Peter Sämann	Albert Fortell, Hannelore Elsner, Barbara Rudnik, Hans-Georg Panczak	Science fiction	a.k.a. Time Troopers. Austrian-West German co-production
Moving Targets	Volker Vogeler	Bernard Fresson, William Berger, Oliver Stritzel	Crime	a.k.a. Zielscheiben
Nebenwirkungen	Ralph Bridle	Bernd Tauber, Ulrich Matschoss, Ursela Monn	Drama	
The NeverEnding Story	Wolfgang Petersen	Noah Hathaway, Barret Oliver, Tami Stronach	Fantasy	West German-American co-production
Night Of The Four Moons	Jörg A. Eggers	Günther Maria Halmer, Kathina Kaiser, Gunnar Möller, Sylva Koscina	Drama	West German-Yugoslav co-production
No One Cries Forever	Jans Rautenbach	Howard Carpendale, Zoli Marki, Elke Sommer, Siegfried Rauch	Romance	West German-South African co-production
No Time for Tears: The Bachmeier Case	Hark Bohm	Marie Colbin	Drama	
No Time to Die	Helmut Ashley	John Phillip Law, Christopher Mitchum, Horst Janson, Grażyna Dyląg, Winfried Glatzeder	Adventure	a.k.a. Hijacked to Hell
The Noah's Ark Principle	Roland Emmerich	Richy Müller, Franz Buchrieser	Science fiction	Entered into the 34th Berlin International Film Festival
Non-Stop Trouble with My Double	Reinhard Schwabenitzky	Dieter Hallervorden	Comedy	a.k.a. Didi – Der Doppelgänger
One of the Missing	Karl Heinz Kramberg	Eisi Gulp	War	a.k.a. Einer von den Vermissten – Die Patrouille des Soldaten Jerome
The Other Side of the Moon	Michael Lähn	Gudrun Landgrebe, Alexander Radszun, Angelika Bender	Crime	
Overheard	Rolf von Sydow	Götz George, Peter Ustinov, Hansjörg Felmy, Heidelinde Weis	Comedy	
Paris, Texas	Wim Wenders	Harry Dean Stanton, Nastassja Kinski, Hunter Carson, Dean Stockwell, Aurore Clément, Bernhard Wicki	Drama	West German-French co-production. Won the Palme d'Or at the 1984 Cannes Film Festival
Peaceful Days	Richard Blank	Katharina Thalbach	Science fiction	
Die Platzanweiserin	Peter Schulze-Rohr	Brigitte Karner, Thomas Anzenhofer, Maria Hartmann	Drama	
Pogo 1104	Wigbert Wicker	Richy Müller, Ralf Richter, Anja Schüte, Erich Bar	Comedy	
Popcorn & Paprika	Sándor Szalkai	Siegfried Rauch, Teri Tordai, Péter Haumann, Hilda Gobbi	Comedy, Sport	Hungarian-West German co-production
Rallye Paris – Dakar	Peter Welz	Hanno Pöschl, Iris Berben	Adventure	a.k.a. Paris–Dakar Rally
Rambo Zambo	Reinhard Donga	Werner Stocker, Bettina Redlich, Horst Kummeth, Eddie Constantine, Peter Kern, Barbara Valentin, Walter Sedlmayr	Crime comedy	
The Record	Daniel Helfer	Uwe Ochsenknecht, László I. Kish, Catarina Raacke, Kurt Raab, Dietrich Mattausch, Jochen Busse, András Fricsay	Comedy	a.k.a. Der Rekord. German-Swiss co-production
Das Rettungslos	Georg Madeja	Peter Bongartz, Christine Ostermayer	Black comedy	Austrian-West German co-production
The Return of the Time Machine	Jürgen Karl Klauß	Klaus Schwarzkopf, Peter Pasetti, Siegfried Wischnewski	Science fiction	
Revolution im Ballsaal	Richard Blank	Hannelore Schroth	Comedy	
Schakaladu	Rigo Manikofski	Jochen Schroeder	Drama	
Der Schatz im Haus	Oswald Döpke	Katerina Jacob, Leslie Malton, Helmut Zierl, Sigfrit Steiner, Louise Martini, Wolfgang Reichmann	Comedy	a.k.a. La bonne nouvelle
Das schöne Ende dieser Welt	Rainer Erler	Robert Atzorn, Claire Oberman, Judy Winter, Götz George, Werner Kreindl	Thriller	
Das schöne irre Judenmädchen	Götz Fischer	Renan Demirkan, Christian Berkel, Marcel Ophuls, Martha Mödl, Heinz Schubert, Herbert Fux	Drama	
Der Sheriff von Linsenbach	Michael Mackenroth	Rolf Schimpf, Volkert Kraeft	Comedy	
Silent Poison	Erwin Keusch	Peter Sattmann, Peter Bongartz, Günter Lamprecht, Sabine Bach	Drama	a.k.a. Slow Poison
Skizze eines Unglücks	Hilde Bechert	Constanze Engelbrecht, Klaus Grünberg	Drama	
Sleep of Reason	Ula Stöckl	Ida Di Benedetto	Drama	
Der Snob	Wolfgang Staudte	Klaus Maria Brandauer, Heinz Bennent, Sigfrit Steiner, Nicole Heesters	Comedy	
So ein Theater	Wolfgang Staudte	Uwe Friedrichsen, Gillian Scalici, Sabine von Maydell, Uwe Dallmeier	Comedy	
Der Sohn des Bullen	Heinz Schirk	Martin May, Edwin Marian, Jan Fedder, Richy Müller	Crime	
The Sprinter	Christoph Böll	Wieland Samolak, Gerhard Olschewski, Dieter Eppler	Comedy, Sport	a.k.a. Der Sprinter
Die Story	Eckhart Schmidt	Thomas Davis, Ulrich Tukur, Sibylle Rauch, Dietmar Schönherr, Burkhard Driest, Sabine von Maydell	Crime	
The Story of the Dolls	Hubert Frank	Tetchie Agbayani, Max Thayer, Sabine Mucha, Vanessa Vaylord, Carina Schally, Brigitta Cimarolli, Jean Saburit	Drama, Romance	a.k.a. Taifun der Zärtlichkeit. West German-Filipino co-production
Super	Adolf Winkelmann	Udo Lindenberg, Renan Demirkan, Hannelore Hoger, Günter Lamprecht, Gottfried John, Inga Humpe	Science fiction	
Swann in Love	Volker Schlöndorff	Jeremy Irons, Ornella Muti, Alain Delon, Fanny Ardant, Anne Bennent, Marie-Christine Barrault	Drama	French-West German co-production
Der Tambour	Carlheinz Caspari	Arnfried Lerche	Drama	
Thousand Eyes	Hans-Christoph Blumenberg	Barbara Rudnik, Armin Mueller-Stahl, Gudrun Landgrebe, Karin Baal, Peter Kraus, Vera Tschechowa, Hannelore Hoger	Crime	a.k.a. 1000 Eyes
Tiger: Springtime in Vienna	Peter Patzak	Art Metrano, William Berger, Eddie Constantine, Lukas Resetarits	Comedy	Austrian-West German co-production
Titanic – Nachspiel einer Katastrophe	Lutz Büscher	Hans Korte, Volkert Kraeft, Arthur Brauss, Sigmar Solbach	Docudrama	
Tod eines Schaustellers	Dietrich Haugk	Karl-Heinz Vosgerau, Hans Helmut Dickow, Karin Baal, Heinz Moog, Hans Korte, Wilfried Baasner, Herbert Stass, Sigmar Solbach	Crime	
Das Tor zum Glück	Michael Verhoeven	Wieland Bubmann	Sport	
Tränen in Florenz	Marianne Klara Schäfer	Wolfgang Joop, Violetta Sanchez, Christoph Eichhorn, Alfred Edel	Drama	a.k.a. Tears in Florence
Trauma	Gabi Kubach	Birgit Doll, Lou Castel, Armin Mueller-Stahl	Crime drama	
Der Trauschein	Ephraim Kishon	Maria Schell, Wolfgang Kieling, Herbert Herrmann, Simone Rethel	Comedy	a.k.a. The Licence
Treffer	Dominik Graf	Dietmar Bär, Barbara Rudnik, Beate Finckh, Tayfun Bademsoy, Maximilian Wigger, Guido Gagliardi	Drama	
Unerreichbare Nähe	Dagmar Hirtz	Kathrin Ackermann, Brigitte Karner, Klaus Grünberg, Loni von Friedl	Drama	
Unser Mann vom Südpol	Peter Adam	Jan Fedder, Tilo Prückner, Monika Baumgartner	Comedy	
Vater gesucht	Bruno Jantoss	Beate Jensen, Christoph M. Ohrt	Drama	a.k.a. Vater gesucht – Psychotherapie einer Prostituierten
Verbotene Hilfe	Liliane Targownik	Gerhard Zemann	Science fiction	
Der Verlust	Claudia Holldack	Joachim Dietmar Mues, Ulli Philipp, Rosemarie Fendel, Irm Hermann	Drama	
Das Verschwinden der Harmonie	Ulrich Heising	Christiane Lemm, Ilse Neubauer, Karl Friedrich, Wolfgang Höper, Peter Brombacher, Michael Habeck, Irm Hermann, Brigitte Janner	Drama	
Die vierte Zeit	Klaus André	Bernhard Minetti, Ulrich Gebauer, Katharina Hill, Anna-Verena Vogel	Drama	
Die violette Mütze	Axel von Ambesser	Simone Rethel, Frithjof Vierock, Horst Niendorf	Comedy	a.k.a. Die violette Mütze oder Morgen sind wir endlich reich
The Wannsee Conference	Heinz Schirk	Dietrich Mattausch, Reinhard Glemnitz, Jochen Busse, Robert Atzorn, Martin Lüttge, Gerd Böckmann, Peter Fitz	Docudrama, War	
Wenn die Musik aus ist, dann ist auch die Liebe aus	Reinhard Donga, Volker Maria Arend	Ferdinand Zander, Carola Niemann	Drama	a.k.a. When the Music Is Over, Love Is Gone
Wenn ich dich nicht hätte	Konrad Sabrautzky	Elisabeth Bergner, Rudolf Platte	Drama	
What's Up, Chancellor?	Gerhard Schmidt	Tommi Piper, Constanze Engelbrecht, Günter Lamprecht, Wolfgang Neuss, Dieter Hildebrandt, Dieter Hallervorden	Comedy	
What Shall Become of You	Horst Flick	Michael Karnowsky, Peter Seum, Anita Lochner	Drama	
Where the Green Ants Dream	Werner Herzog	Bruce Spence	Drama	West German-Australian co-production. Entered into the 1984 Cannes Film Festival
Who Was Edgar Allan?	Michael Haneke	Paulus Manker, Rolf Hoppe	Mystery	Austrian-West German co-production
The Willow Tree	Sohrab Shahid-Saless	Josef A. Stehlík	Drama	West German-Czechoslovak co-production
Windy Story	Masato Harada	Hiroyuki Watanabe, Dean Reed, Patrick Stewart, Leslie Malton	Drama, Sport	a.k.a. ウインディー. a.k.a. Der erste Sieg. Japanese-West German co-production
The Woman Without a Body and the Projectionist	Niklaus Schilling	Gabriel Barylli, Liane Hielscher	Drama	West German-Luxembourgian co-production
Work and Leisure	Detlev Buck	Detlev Buck	Comedy	a.k.a. First the Work – And Then?
Wundkanal	Thomas Harlan	Alfred Filbert	Drama	
A Year of the Quiet Sun	Krzysztof Zanussi	Scott Wilson, Maja Komorowska, Vadim Glowna	Drama	Polish-West German co-production
Yerma	Imre Gyöngyössy, Barna Kabay	Gudrun Landgrebe, Titusz Kovács, Mathieu Carrière	Drama	Hungarian-West German co-production
Your Place or Mine?	Wolfgang Spier	Wolf Roth, Susanne Uhlen	Comedy	a.k.a. Zu dir oder zu mir?
Zaubergarten	Ottomar Birth, Walter A. Franke	Despina Pajanou	Fantasy	
Zwei Nasen tanken Super	Dieter Pröttel	Thomas Gottschalk, Mike Krüger	Comedy	a.k.a. 2 Nasen tanken Super

== 1985 ==
Title	Director	Cast	Genre	Notes
250.000 Mücken im Pappkarton	Norbert Schultze Jr.	Peer Schmidt, Heinz Baumann	Crime comedy	
Abenteuer der Seele	Jochen Richter	Rita Kail, Friedrich-Karl Praetorius, Ernst Hannawald	Biography	a.k.a. Abenteuer der Seele – Karoline von Günderrode
Die Abschiebung	Marianne Lüdcke	Tayfun Bademsoy, Nina Hoger, Franz Buchrieser, Karin Baal	Drama	a.k.a. The Deportation
Abschied in Berlin	Antonio Skármeta	Bernhard Veith, Käte Jaenicke, Gabriel Skármeta, Ernesto Malbrán	Comedy	West German-Portuguese co-production
Abschied von der Hinterbank	Joachim Roering	Manfred Reddemann, Irmgard Riessen	Comedy	
The Accomplices	Stanislav Barabáš	Günter Lamprecht	Drama	
Ain't Nothin' Without You	Pia Frankenberg	Pia Frankenberg, Klaus Bueb	Comedy	a.k.a. Noisy Martha
Alle Geister kreisen	Peter Przygodda	Gila von Weitershausen	Drama	
Alles Paletti	Michael Lentz	Levin Kress, Maria Ketikidou, Peter Lohmeyer, Branko Pleša	Drama	
Alpha City	Eckhart Schmidt	Al Corley, Isabelle Willer, Claude-Oliver Rudolph	Thriller	
Alte Sünden rosten nicht	Axel von Ambesser	Gert Fröbe, Marion Kracht, Richard Münch	Comedy	
Amelie, ich komme	Hans Noever	Towje Kleiner	Comedy	
Eine andere Frau	Marco Serafini	Bruno Dallansky, Eva Ingeborg Scholz, Leslie Malton, Helmut Zierl	Drama	
Andre Handles Them All	Peter Fratzscher	Franco Nero, Ingrid Steeger, Willeke van Ammelrooy, Maja Maranow	Comedy	
Angry Harvest	Agnieszka Holland	Armin Mueller-Stahl, Elisabeth Trissenaar, Wojciech Pszoniak	Drama, War	
The Assault of the Present on the Rest of Time	Alexander Kluge	Armin Mueller-Stahl, Jutta Hoffmann, Rosel Zech, Hans-Michael Rehberg, Alfred Edel	Drama	
Backfischliebe	Rolf Hädrich	Chris Ahrens, Maria von Bismarck, Manuela Joest, Diana Körner, Karl-Heinz von Hassel	Comedy	
Bartolomé oder Die Rückkehr der weißen Götter	Eberhard Itzenplitz	Gottfried John, Elpidia Carrillo, Carmen Bunster, Rubén Pagura	Biography	West German-Mexican-Costa Rican co-production
Beethoven's Nephew	Paul Morrissey	Wolfgang Reichmann, Dietmar Prinz, Jane Birkin, Nathalie Baye, Mathieu Carrière	Biography, Music	French-West German co-production
Beinah Trinidad	Oliver Storz	Iris Berben, Elmar Wepper, Peter Zilles	Crime comedy	a.k.a. Beinahe Trinidad
The Berlin Affair	Liliana Cavani	Gudrun Landgrebe, Kevin McNally, Mio Takaki, Hanns Zischler	Drama	West German-Italian co-production
Betrayed	Harun Farocki	Roland Schäfer, Nina Hoger, Katja Rupé	Crime	a.k.a. Betrogen
Black and Without Sugar	Lutz Konermann	Edda Heiðrún Backman, Lutz Konermann	Drama	
The Black Cannon Incident	Huang Jianxin	Liu Zifeng, Gao Ming, Gerhard Olschewski	Comedy	a.k.a. Der Zwischenfall mit der schwarzen Kanone. Chinese-West German co-production
Blanche oder Das Atelier im Garten	Hansgünther Heyme	Elke Petri, Angelica Domröse, Paul Albert Krumm	Drama	
Close-Up	Peter Schulze-Rohr	Armin Mueller-Stahl	Thriller	a.k.a. Hautnah
Coconuts	Franz Novotny	Hanno Pöschl, Olivia Pascal, Rainhard Fendrich, Mario Adorf	Crime comedy	Austrian-West German co-production
Colonel Redl	István Szabó	Klaus Maria Brandauer, Armin Mueller-Stahl, Gudrun Landgrebe, Hans Christian Blech, Jan Niklas	Drama	West German-Hungarian co-production
Commando Leopard	Antonio Margheriti	Lewis Collins, Klaus Kinski, Manfred Lehmann, John Steiner	Action	Italian-West German co-production
Concert for Alice	Thomas Koerfer	Beate Jensen, Towje Kleiner	Musical	Swiss-West German-Austrian co-production
The Cop and the Girl	Peter Keglevic	Jürgen Prochnow, Annette von Klier	Action, Drama	a.k.a. Der Bulle und das Mädchen
A Crime of Honour	John Goldschmidt	David Suchet, Maria Schneider, Dietmar Schönherr	Drama	a.k.a. A Song for Europe a.k.a. Streng vertraulich. British-West German-Austrian-Swiss co-production
Crooks in Paradise	Thomas Fantl	Armin Mueller-Stahl, Jutta Speidel, Walo Lüönd, Ruth Maria Kubitschek	Crime comedy	
Daheim sterben die Leut’	Klaus Gietinger, Leo Hiemer	Walter Nuber, Heribert Weber, Norbert Hauber, Anni Rapps	Comedy	
Damenwahl	Wolfgang Becker	Ernst Schröder, Edda Seippel, Elisabeth Wiedemann, Rainer Hunold	Comedy	
The Dark Glow of the Mountains	Werner Herzog		Documentary	
Day Thieves	Marcel Gisler	Dina Leipzig, Rudolf Nadler, Lutz Deisinger	Drama	a.k.a. Tagediebe
Deadly Twins	Joe Oaks	Audrey Landers, Judy Landers, Jan Fedder	Thriller	a.k.a. Deadly Trigger
The Death of the White Stallion	Christian Ziewer	Thomas Anzenhofer, Angela Schanelec, Udo Samel, Ulrich Wildgruber, Dietmar Schönherr	Historical drama	Entered into the 35th Berlin International Film Festival
Dormire	Niklaus Schilling	Sunnyi Melles, Sabina Trooger	Drama	
Double Exposure	Hajo Gies	Wolfram Berger, Gunnar Möller, Brigitte Karner	Thriller	a.k.a. Geheime Mission
Drei gegen Drei	Dominik Graf	Trio, Sunnyi Melles, Ralf Wolter, Peer Augustinski, Günter Meisner	Comedy	a.k.a. 3 gegen 3
Edvige Scimitt	Matthias Zschokke	Ingrid Kaiser	Drama	Swiss-West German co-production
Entführung	Günter Gräwert	Gerhard Olschewski, Manfred Zapatka, Towje Kleiner	Crime	
The Father of a Murderer	Carlheinz Caspari	Hans Korte	Drama	
The Feather Fairy	Juraj Jakubisko	Giulietta Masina, Tobias Hoesl, Soňa Valentová	Family	a.k.a. Frau Holle. Czechoslovak-West German-Austrian-Italian co-production
Feel the Motion	Wolfgang Büld	Ingolf Lück, Limahl, Falco, Pia Zadora, Die Toten Hosen	Music, Comedy	a.k.a. Der Formel Eins Film
Felice heißt der Glückliche	Hilde Bechert	Michele Oliveri	Drama	a.k.a. Felice heißt der Glückliche – Die Geschichte vom Poeten als Kellner
Feuerwanzen küss ich nicht	Karl Heinz Deickert	Christian Quadflieg, Gaby Dohm	Comedy	
Flammenzeichen	Franz Seitz	Dietrich Mattausch	War, Biography	a.k.a. Flammenzeichen – Das Leben des Jesuitenpaters Rupert Mayer
Flight Without End	Michael Kehlmann	Helmuth Lohner, Mario Adorf, Evelyn Engleder, Leslee Udwin, Dagmar Mettler, Peter Weck, Fritz Muliar, Heinrich Schweiger, Kurt Sowinetz	Drama, War	Austrian-West German-Swiss co-production
Forget Mozart	Miloslav Luther	Max Tidof, Armin Mueller-Stahl, Uwe Ochsenknecht, Catarina Raacke, Winfried Glatzeder, Wolfgang Preiss, Katja Flint	Biography, Music	
Eine Frau für gewisse Stunden	Wolfgang Müller	Christiane Krüger, Wolfgang Müller, Manfred Lehmann	Drama	
Die Frau mit den Karfunkelsteinen	Dagmar Damek	Irina Wanka, Martin Maria Blau, Christian Quadflieg, Christoph Eichhorn, Agnes Fink, Sigfrit Steiner, Miko, Barbara Valentin	Drama	
Fundsache	Herbert Ballmann	Ursela Monn, Peter Seum	Drama	
Die Geldverleiherin	Horst Königstein	Carola Regnier, Heinz Baumann	Drama	
Gerichtliches Nachspiel	Erwin Keusch	Constanze Engelbrecht, Peter Bongartz	Comedy	
German Dreams	Lienhard Wawrzyn	Ilona Lewanowski, Angela Leiberg	Drama	
Das Gespinst	Ilse Hofmann	Heiner Lauterbach, Wolfgang Reichmann	Science fiction	
Gesucht: Urlaubsbekanntschaften, männlich	Wolfgang Mühlbauer	Monika Baumgartner, Matthias Ponnier, Henry van Lyck, Anita Lochner, Vérénice Rudolph, Nicolas Brieger, Cornelia Meinhardt, Felix von Manteuffel, Joseline Gassen, Wolfgang Bathke	Comedy	
Girl in a Boot	Herbert Ballmann	Ursela Monn, Christian Kohlund	Comedy	a.k.a. A Berlin Love Story a.k.a. Einmal Ku'damm und zurück
Grand mit 3 Damen	Frank Guthke	Nicolas Brieger, Lucie Visser, Angelika Bender, Daniela Ziegler, Richard Münch	Crime	a.k.a. Grand mit drei Damen
Grenzenloses Himmelblau	Marcus Scholz	Inge Meysel, Evelyn Hamann, Wolfgang Kieling, Pinkas Braun, Christian Wolff	Comedy	
Großer Bahnhof	Georg Marischka	Witta Pohl, Heinz Meier, Axel von Ambesser, Ingeborg Schöner	Comedy	a.k.a. Großer Bahnhof – Hilfe, die Franzosen kommen!
Grottenolm	Rainer Kirberg	Amanda Lear, Tchéky Karyo, Caroline Chaniolleau, Matthias Fuchs	Drama	
Grünstein's Clever Move	Bernhard Wicki	Fred Düren, Klaus Schwarzkopf, Jörg Gudzuhn, Rolf Hoppe	Drama	a.k.a. Die Grünstein-Variante. West German-East German co-production
Hans: A Young Man in Germany	Sohrab Shahid-Saless	Martin Pasko	Drama	a.k.a. Hans: A Boy in Germany
Hart an der Grenze	Wolfgang Tumler	Klaus Löwitsch	Thriller	
Das Hintertürl zum Paradies	Reinhard Donga	Elmar Wepper, Michaela May, Franz Xaver Kroetz, Martin Sperr	Comedy	
Hochzeit	Kurt Wilhelm	Werner Asam, Gundi Ellert, Fred Stillkrauth	Comedy	
Der Hochzeitstag	Konrad Sabrautzky	Witta Pohl, Dieter Kirchlechner, Maja Maranow	Drama	
Die Hose	Otto Schenk	Hilmar Thate, Angelica Domröse, Sabine Sinjen, Friedrich-Karl Praetorius	Comedy	a.k.a. The Knickers
Der Hund im Computer	Rudolf Nussgruber	Christian Wolff	Comedy	
Im Schatten von gestern	Thomas Hartwig	Franz Rudnick, Towje Kleiner	Drama	
In the Belly of the Whale	Doris Dörrie	Janna Marangosoff, Eisi Gulp, Peter Sattmann, Silvia Reize	Drama	
The Invincible	Gusztáv Hámos	Piero von Arnim, Udo Kier, Hans Peter Hallwachs, Kurt von Ruffin, Lotti Huber	Science fiction	a.k.a. Der Unbesiegbare
Jack of Spades	Vivian Naefe	Hanno Pöschl, Sigfrit Steiner	Drama	a.k.a. Schwarzer Bube
Joey	Roland Emmerich	Joshua Morrell, Tammy Shields, Eva Kryll	Horror	a.k.a. Making Contact. West German-American co-production
Julia	Wolfgang Glück	Rosel Zech, Michael Degen	Comedy	a.k.a. Adorable Julia a.k.a. Theatre
Kaiser und eine Nacht	Markus Fischer	Emil Steinberger, Brigitte Karner, Rolf Hoppe, Rosemarie Fendel	Comedy	Swiss-West German co-production
Kaminsky	Michael Lähn	Klaus Löwitsch, Hannelore Elsner, Beate Finckh, Alexander Radszun	Drama	
Der Kampfschwimmer	Alexander von Eschwege	Peter Lohmeyer, Holger Schulzendorf, Gerhard Olschewski	Drama	
Käthe Kollwitz	Herbert Ballmann	Cordula Trantow	Biography, Docudrama	
King Kongs Faust	Heiner Stadler	Leonard Lansink, László Benedek, Wim Wenders, Bernd Eichinger, Franz Seitz	Mockumentary	
Der kleine Riese	Imo Moszkowicz	Hans Clarin, Raimund Harmstorf, Doris Kunstmann, Beatrice Richter	Drama	
Der Krieg meines Vaters	Nico Hofmann	Hans-Joachim Grau	War	
Liebe lässt alle Blumen blühen	Marco Serafini	Beatrice Kessler, Giovanni Früh, Jean-Claude Pascal, Darry Cowl, Roger Carel	Crime comedy	a.k.a. Liebe läßt alle Blumen blühen
Die Liebesforscherin	Annelie Runge	Grischa Huber	Drama	
Liebfrauen	Wolfgang Panzer	Marianne Hoppe, Günter Lamprecht	Drama	
Lindhoops Frau	Eberhard Itzenplitz	Cornelia Meinhardt, Christoph Quest	Drama	
Loft	Eckhart Schmidt	Andreas Sportelli, Karl-Heinz von Liebezeit, Sibylle Rauch, Max Tidof, Catarina Raacke, Ralph Schicha	Horror	
Mamas Geburtstag	Egon Günther	Brigitte Horney, Helmuth Lohner, Angelica Domröse, Michael Hinz	Drama	
Ein Mann ist soeben erschossen worden	Thomas Engel	Hannelore Elsner, Robert Atzorn, Georg Thomalla, Erik Schumann	Thriller	
Marilyn	Ralf Huettner	Barbara May, Enrico Boetcher	Comedy	
Mary Ward	Angelika Weber	Hannelore Elsner, Mario Adorf, Bernhard Wicki, Mathieu Carrière	Biography	
Men...	Doris Dörrie	Heiner Lauterbach, Uwe Ochsenknecht, Ulrike Kriener	Comedy	
Mit Axel auf Achse	Wilfried Dotzel	Uwe Friedrichsen, Judy Winter, Gerd Baltus, Gert Haucke, Uwe Dallmeier, Peter Kern, Harald Juhnke	Comedy	
Die Mitläufer	Erwin Leiser, Eberhard Itzenplitz	Armin Mueller-Stahl, Gottfried John, Karin Baal, Lisi Mangold, Horst Bollmann	Docudrama, War	a.k.a. The Sympathizers a.k.a. Following the Führer
Mord im Spiel	Hartmut Griesmayr	Gerd Baltus, Krista Posch, Stephan Schwartz, Gerhard Olschewski	Crime	
Mord zu vier Händen	Oswald Döpke	Lola Müthel, Doris Schade, Helmut Zierl, Katerina Jacob	Crime	
Morenga	Egon Günther	Ken Gampu, Jacques Breuer, Edwin Noël, Nomsa Nene, Vernon Dobtcheff, Brian O'Shaughnessy, Arnold Vosloo	War	Entered into the 35th Berlin International Film Festival
Die Nacht	Hans-Jürgen Syberberg	Edith Clever	Drama	a.k.a. The Night
Nachtgelächter	Dagmar Damek	Michael König, Grischa Huber	Drama	
Nebel jagen	Nicolas Humbert	Philip Gröning, Iris Disse, Michael Wogh	Drama	Swiss-West German-Austrian co-production
The Nice Old Man and the Pretty Girl	Margit Saad	Peter Pasetti, Leslie Malton, Klaus Schwarzkopf	Comedy	a.k.a. Die Geschichte vom guten alten Herrn und dem schönen Mädchen
Noch ein Jahr und sechs Tage	Alexander von Eschwege	Peter Lohmeyer, Martin Lüttge	Drama	
Non-Stop Trouble with the Family	Dieter Hallervorden, Christian Rateuke	Dieter Hallervorden	Comedy	a.k.a. Didi und die Rache der Enterbten
Not to Disturb	Peter Wood	Siemen Rühaak, Karl Michael Vogler, Gila von Weitershausen, Ruth Maria Kubitschek, Roland Schäfer, Wolf-Dietrich Berg, Siegfried W. Kernen	Comedy	a.k.a. Bitte nicht stören
November Moon	Alexandra von Grote	Gabriele Osburg, Christiane Millet, Danièle Delorme	Drama, War	West German-French co-production
On the Killer's Track	Hajo Gies	Götz George, Renan Demirkan, Charles Brauer, Rufus, Eberhard Feik	Action, Drama	a.k.a. A Tooth for a Tooth. Film with TV hero Schimanski (Tatort)
Die Orgel	Gero Erhardt	Hans Christian Blech	Comedy	a.k.a. Die Orgel – Eine Weihnachts- geschichte
Otto – Der Film	Xaver Schwarzenberger	Otto Waalkes, Sky du Mont, Jessika Cardinahl, Elisabeth Wiedemann, Peter Kuiper, Johannes Heesters	Comedy	a.k.a. Otto: The Movie
Paulchen	Michael Günther	Walter Gross	Comedy	
Pilot Error	Hartmut Griesmayr	Peter Ehrlich, Dieter Kirchlechner, Wolfgang Völz	Crime	a.k.a. Der Fehler des Piloten
The Play's the Thing	Otto Schenk	Martin Benrath, Ursela Monn, Helmuth Lohner, Hans Clarin	Comedy	a.k.a. The Play at the Castle
Power of Evil	Krzysztof Zanussi	Vittorio Gassman, Marie-Christine Barrault, Benjamin Völz, Raf Vallone, Hark Bohm	Drama	a.k.a. Paradigma. Italian-French-West German co-production
The Practice of Love	Valie Export	Adelheid Arndt, Rüdiger Vogler	Drama	Austrian-West German co-production
Das Rätsel der Sandbank	Rainer Boldt	Peter Sattmann, Burghart Klaußner, Isabel Varell, Gunnar Möller	Spy thriller	a.k.a. The Riddle of the Sands. Short edited version of the eponymous TV series
Rauhnacht	Klaus Weise	Michael Greiling, Nini von Quast	Drama	
Red Heat	Robert Collector	Linda Blair, Sylvia Kristel, Elisabeth Volkmann	Exploitation	West German-American co-production
Retouche	Beat Lottaz, Dieter Funk	Bernd Tauber	Drama	
Richy Guitar	Michael Laux	Die Ärzte	Coming of Age, Music	
Rita Rita	Dieter Pfaff	Geno Lechner, Axel Milberg	Drama	
Die Sache ist gelaufen	Rainer Wolffhardt	Uwe Ochsenknecht, Cornelia Köndgen	Comedy	
Der Schiedsrichter	Rolf von Sydow	Wolfgang Kieling	Drama	
Die Schwärmer	Hans Neuenfels	Elisabeth Trissenaar, Sabine Sinjen, Joachim Bliese, Hermann Treusch, Gottfried John	Drama	a.k.a. The Enthusiasts a.k.a. The Dreamer
Schwarzer Lohn und weiße Weste	Marco Serafini	Karl Walter Diess, Peer Schmidt, Brigitte Mira	Crime	
Seduction: The Cruel Woman	Elfi Mikesch, Monika Treut	Mechthild Großmann, Udo Kier	Drama	
Seitenstechen	Dieter Pröttel	Mike Krüger, Susanne Uhlen, Werner Kreindl, Gert Haucke	Comedy	a.k.a. Love Pains
Sie rüsten zur Reise ins Dritte Reich	Jens-Peter Behrend	Klaus Schwarzkopf, Peter Matić	Docudrama	a.k.a. Kurt Tucholsky und der Prozeß Harden
Silvester in Treptow	Claudia Holldack	Joachim Dietmar Mues, Ilse Pagé, Stephan Orlac	Drama	
The Snowman	Peter F. Bringmann	Marius Müller-Westernhagen, Polly Eltes, Towje Kleiner	Action thriller	
Die Splitter der Eisbombe	Jo Baier	Wolfgang Idler, Daniel Cohn-Bendit	Thriller	
Die Spur der anderen	Daniel Christoff	Manfred Zapatka, Nicole Heesters	Drama	
Der Stadtbrand	Oliver Storz	Ernst Stankovski	Drama	
Stadttheater	Thomas Fantl	Wolfgang Kieling, Peter Aust, Ute Christensen, Antje Hagen, Renate Küster	Comedy	
Stage Struck	Michael Günther	Helmuth Lohner, Louise Martini, Christian Kohlund, Wolfgang Wahl	Crime	a.k.a. Theaterblut
Sterne fallen nicht vom Himmel	Ulrich Stark	Diether Krebs, Tilo Prückner, Reiner Schöne, Sky du Mont	Comedy	
Strafmündig	Roland Gall	Robert Düssler	Drama	
The Strangers in the House	Bernd Fischerauer	Walter Buschhoff, Anja Jaenicke, Karl Michael Vogler, Werner Stocker	Thriller	a.k.a. Stranger in the House
Strawberry Fields	Kristian Kühn	Beate Jensen, Rolf Zacher, Thomas Schücke, Lisa Kreuzer	Drama	a.k.a. Die doppelte Welt. West German-Austrian co-production
Suddenly at Home	Thomas Engel	Jutta Speidel, Michael Degen, Monika Peitsch, Udo Vioff	Crime	a.k.a. Plötzlich und unerwartet
Sugarbaby	Percy Adlon	Marianne Sägebrecht, Eisi Gulp	Comedy	
Sunday	Stanislav Barabáš	Lisa Kreuzer, Hans-Georg Panczak, Catriona MacColl, Wolfgang Büttner, Eva Maria Meineke, Francesco Carnelutti	Thriller	
Sylter Novelle	Peter Deutsch	Anja Kruse, Benjamin Völz	Drama	
Szenen aus dem Leben des Johann Sebastian Bach	Ferry Radax	Peter Aust	Biography, Music	
Tango im Bauch	Ute Wieland	Karina Fallenstein	Drama	
Time to Kill	Eberhard Itzenplitz	Gila von Weitershausen, Ursela Monn, Peer Augustinski	Thriller	a.k.a. Bereit zum Mord. West German-Swiss co-production
Der Tod aus dem Computer	Dieter Finnern	Susanne Uhlen, Bernd Herzsprung, Klaus Schwarzkopf, Alexander Kerst	Thriller	
Tokyo-Ga	Wim Wenders		Documentary	
Le Transfuge	Philippe Lefebvre	Bruno Cremer, Heinz Bennent, Lisa Kreuzer, Jean-François Balmer	Cold War spy film	a.k.a. Stegers letzte Chance. French-West German co-production
Der Traum der Schwestern Pechstein	Nina Grosse	Ellen Frank	Drama	
Treffpunkt Leipzig	Jürgen Karl Klauß	Hansjoachim Krietsch, Heike Schroetter	Comedy	
Verworrene Bilanzen	Peter Beauvais	Gottfried John, Beatrice Kessler, Michael Hampe, Siemen Rühaak	Crime	
Vorsichtige Berührung	Dagmar Damek	Gila von Weitershausen, Winfried Glatzeder	Drama	
Walkman Blues	Alfred Behrens	Heikko Deutschmann	Drama	
Wanda	Hans Noever	Elisabeth Trissenaar, Adelheid Arndt	Thriller	
Westler	Wieland Speck	Rainer Strecker, Sigurd Rachman	Drama	
Wodzeck	Oliver Herbrich	Detlev Kügow	Drama	Entered into the 14th Moscow International Film Festival
Das Wunder	Eckhart Schmidt	Anja Schüte, Raimund Harmstorf, Dagmar Lassander	Drama	
Die Wupper	Jürgen Flimm	Klaus Pohl, Willy Millowitsch, Wolf-Dietrich Sprenger, Peter Franke, Felix von Manteuffel, Angela Schanelec, Christoph Waltz	Drama	
Zwischen den Zeiten	Lutz Büscher	Manfred Günther, Manfred Heidmann, Katja Flint	Drama	

== 1986 ==
Title	Director	Cast	Genre	Notes
'38 – Vienna Before the Fall	Wolfgang Glück	Tobias Engel, Sunnyi Melles	Drama	Austrian-West German co-production
40 Quadratmeter Deutschland	Tevfik Başer	Özay Fecht, Yaman Okay, Demir Gökgöl	Drama	a.k.a. Forty Square Meters of Germany a.k.a. 40 m^{2} Deutschland
585 Kiloherz	Heiko Schier	Clemens Füsers	Comedy	
Abschiede	Gedeon Kovács	Karlheinz Hackl, Mijou Kovacs	Drama	Austrian-West German co-production
Abschiedsvorstellung	Peter Weck	Eberhard Fechner, Klaus Schwarzkopf, Peter Pasetti, Anne-Marie Blanc, Susi Nicoletti, Lola Müthel, Diether Krebs, Sabine Sinjen	Crime comedy	
Altrosa	Eberhard Itzenplitz	Elfriede Kuzmany, Patrick Winczewski	Drama	
Am Morgen meines Todes	Rainer Wolffhardt	Christoph Moosbrugger, Ilse Matheis	Biography	a.k.a. Am Morgen meines Todes – Die letzten 24 Stunden im Leben des Heinrich von Kleist
Am nächsten Morgen kehrte der Minister nicht an seinen Arbeitsplatz zurück	Monika Funke-Stern	Udo Kier	Science fiction	
Die Andere	Ilse Hofmann	Heiner Lauterbach, Magdalena Ritter	Thriller	
Andrea Roll – Eine Zumutung	Jürgen Sehmisch	Hildegard Lena Kuhlenberg, Peter Bongartz, Antje Hagen	Drama	
Der Antrag	Rolf Busch	Sabine Postel	Drama	
Aranka	Gernot Eigler	Anke Sevenich, Suzanne von Borsody	Drama	
Auf den Tag genau	Michael Lähn	Armin Mueller-Stahl, Günther Maria Halmer, Werner Kreindl, Ivan Desny	Thriller	
Der Aufstand	Peter Patzak	Joachim Bißmeier, Monica Bleibtreu	Drama	Austrian-West German co-production
Aus familiären Gründen	Axel von Ambesser	Hans Christian Blech, Bruni Löbel	Comedy	
Bankgeheimnisse	Frank Strecker	Hans Peter Korff, Volkert Kraeft	Drama	
Betrogene Liebe	Diethard Klante	Rosel Zech, Harald Kuhlmann, Agnes Fink	Drama	
Blessings of the Earth	Karin Brandauer	Dietrich Siegl, Heinrich Schweiger	Drama	a.k.a. The Earth and the Fullness Thereof a.k.a. Erdsegen. Austrian-West German co-production
Blinding Moment: Anton Webern's Death	Gert Jonke	Stuart Rudin, Peter Fitz	War	a.k.a. Geblendeter Augenblick – Anton Weberns Tod
Boundaries of Time: Caspar David Friedrich	Peter Schamoni	Helmut Griem, Sabine Sinjen, Hans Peter Hallwachs, Otto Sander, Rolf Hoppe	Biography, Docudrama	West German-East German-French co-production
Die Brücke am schwarzen Fluß	Berengar Pfahl	Judy Winter	Drama	
Cortuga	Edwin Marian	Heiner Lauterbach, Sissy Höfferer	Drama	
Deadly Nightcap	Gerhard Klingenberg	Andrea Jonasson, Karl Michael Vogler, Wolfgang Reichmann, Dietlinde Turban	Crime	a.k.a. Mord am Pool
Didi Drives Me Crazy	Wigbert Wicker	Dieter Hallervorden	Comedy	a.k.a. Didi auf vollen Touren
Der Drücker	Uwe Frießner	Andreas Buttler, Heinz Hoenig	Drama	
Du mich auch	Anja Franke, Helmut Berger, Dani Levy	Anja Franke, Dani Levy	Comedy	a.k.a. Same to You
Du oder ich	Hans-Henning Borgelt	Johann Jakob Wurster, Hermann Schmidt-Rahmer, Barbara Fenner, Rolf Becker	Sport	a.k.a. Du oder ich – Radrennsport und Liebe
Egomania: Island Without Hope	Christoph Schlingensief	Tilda Swinton, Udo Kier	Drama	
Die Einsteiger	Sigi Rothemund	Thomas Gottschalk, Mike Krüger, Udo Kier	Comedy, Science fiction	
Fatal Love	Wolf Gremm	Dietlinde Turban, Ruth Maria Kubitschek, Brigitte Mira	Thriller	a.k.a. Possession
Fatherland	Ken Loach	Gerulf Pannach, Fabienne Babe, Cristine Rose	Drama	a.k.a. Singing the Blues in Red. British-West German-French co-production
Ein fernes Leben	Konrad Sabrautzky	Hannelore Hoger, Günther Maria Halmer	Drama	
Fire and Ice	Willy Bogner Jr.	Suzy Chaffee, John Eaves	Sport, Romantic comedy	
Der Flieger	Erwin Keusch	Martin May, Ulrike Kriener	Drama	
Flight North	Ingemo Engström	Katharina Thalbach, Jukka-Pekka Palo, Lena Olin	Drama	West German-Finnish co-production. Entered into the 36th Berlin International Film Festival
Flucht nach vorn	Heidi Genée	Nina Hoger, Magdalena Ritter	Drama	a.k.a. Flucht nach vorne
Franza	Xaver Schwarzenberger	Elisabeth Trissenaar, Gabriel Barylli, Armin Mueller-Stahl, Sky du Mont, Gottfried John	Drama	Austrian-West German co-production
Die Frau des Reporters	Heide Pils	Marthe Keller, Alejandro Parodi, Malena Doria	Drama	West German-Austrian co-production
Fraulein	Michael Haneke	Angelica Domröse, Lou Castel	Drama	
Die Fräulein von damals	Dietrich Haugk	Horst Buchholz, Karin Baal, Johanna von Koczian, Doris Kunstmann, Judy Winter, Klaus Schwarzkopf	Drama	
Das ganz helle Licht	Dagmar Damek	Michael König, Ilse Ritter	Drama	
Geheimnis in Cornwall	Michael Mackenroth	Silke Dornow, Peter Sattmann, Horst Kummeth, Christine Wodetzky	Crime	
Das Geheimnis von Lismore Castle	Franz Josef Gottlieb	Carl-Heinz Schroth, Vera Tschechowa, Christian Wolff, Hans Clarin	Crime	a.k.a. The Man Who Changed His Name
Das Gehirn zu Pferde	Hans Neuenfels	Gottfried John, Elisabeth Trissenaar	Drama	a.k.a. Das Gehirn zu Pferde – Paraphrase über August Strindberg in drei Nächten
Das Go! Projekt	Oliver Hirschbiegel	Diego Wallraff, Hans Peter Hallwachs, Hark Bohm	Science fiction	
The Golden Cage	Heidi Genée	Heike Faber	Drama	
Gretchens Faust	Joachim Roering	Bruni Löbel, Hans Korte	Comedy	
Heidenlöcher	Wolfram Paulus	Florian Pircher, Matthias Aichhorn, Albert Paulus	Drama, War	a.k.a. Hideouts. Austrian-West German co-production
Das heilige Experiment	Max Peter Ammann	Werner Kreindl, Jón Laxdal, Gerd Böckmann, Gert Westphal, Dietmar Schönherr	Drama	a.k.a. The Strong Are Lonely a.k.a. The Holy Experiment. Swiss-Austrian-West German co-production
Herschel und die Musik der Sterne	Percy Adlon	Josef Meinrad, Rolf Illig, Karin Anselm	Drama, Music, Biography	a.k.a. Herschel and the Music of the Stars
Jimmy Allegretto	Berengar Pfahl	Sona MacDonald, Guido Gagliardi, Volker Lippmann, Judy Winter, Ivan Desny	Musical	
Johnny Flash	Werner Nekes	Helge Schneider	Comedy, Music	
The Journey	Markus Imhoof	Markus Boysen, Corinna Kirchhoff, Will Quadflieg, Claude-Oliver Rudolph	Drama	West German-Swiss co-production
Der Junge mit dem Jeep	Michael Werlin	Richy Müller, Christina Plate, Klaus Schwarzkopf	Comedy	
Der Kandidat	Thomas Engel	Klaus Schwarzkopf, Chariklia Baxevanos, Harald Leipnitz	Comedy	a.k.a. The Candidate a.k.a. Le Candidat
Kennwort Möwe	Tom Toelle	Hans Christian Blech, Karl-Heinz Vosgerau, Dieter Kirchlechner, Beatrice Kessler	Thriller	
Killing Cars	Michael Verhoeven	Jürgen Prochnow, Senta Berger, William Conrad, Agnès Soral, Bernhard Wicki, Daniel Gélin	Action thriller	a.k.a. Blitz
Kolping	Wilm ten Haaf	Robert Atzorn	Biography	a.k.a. Adolph Kolping
Laputa	Helma Sanders-Brahms	Sami Frey, Krystyna Janda	Drama	Screened at the 1986 Cannes Film Festival
Laufen, leiden, länger leben	Christian Görlitz	Gerhart Lippert, Claudia Wedekind	Drama	
Ein Leben ohne Geländer	Georg Madeja	Friedrich von Thun	Biography	a.k.a. Ein Leben ohne Geländer: Ödön von Horváth. Austrian-West German co-production
Die letzte Rolle	Egon Günther	Hans Christian Blech, Jürgen Holtz, Corinna Kirchhoff, Juraj Kukura	Drama	
Letzte Tage	Ilse Biberti	Hannelore Elsner, Juraj Kukura	Drama	
Die Lokomotive	Christian Görlitz	Gisela Peltzer	Drama	a.k.a. La Locomotive
Das Mädchen und die Tauben	Rainer Wolffhardt	Ilse Matheis, Thomas Schücke, Jürgen Thormann	Fantasy	
Mademoiselle Fifi	Karl Fruchtmann	Christoph Eichhorn, Desirée Meiser, Rüdiger Vogler	War, Drama	
Mary Stuart	Heinz Schirk	Anja Kruse, Dietrich Mattausch, Erik Frey, Karl Walter Diess, Daniela Ziegler	Drama	a.k.a. Maria Stuart
Meier	Peter Timm	Rainer Grenkowitz, Nadja Engelbrecht	Comedy	
Menu total	Christoph Schlingensief	Alfred Edel, Helge Schneider	Horror	
Miko: From the Gutter to the Stars	Frank Ripploh	Miko	Music, Comedy	
Mir reicht's – und wie geht's Dir?	Heidi Genée	Johanna Liebeneiner, Helmut Zierl	Drama	
Miscellaneous News	Alexander Kluge	Marita Breuer, Rosel Zech, André Jung, Sabina Trooger	Drama	a.k.a. Vermischte Nachrichten
Momo	Johannes Schaaf	John Huston, Armin Mueller-Stahl, Radost Bokel, Mario Adorf, Leopoldo Trieste, Ninetto Davoli	Family, Fantasy	West German-Italian co-production
Morlove	Samir	Michel Hüttner, Dana Cebulla, Kamil Krejčí	Crime comedy	a.k.a. Morlove – Eine Ode für Heisenberg. Swiss-West German co-production
The Murder Menu	Michael Günther	Witta Pohl, Hannelore Elsner, Michael Degen	Thriller	a.k.a. Deadly Embrace
Murder with Love	Wolf Dietrich	Peter Bongartz, Barbara Rudnik, Peter Fricke, Arthur Brauss, Tilo Prückner	Crime	a.k.a. Kein Alibi für eine Leiche
Der Nachbar	Markus Fischer	Rolf Hoppe, Eva Scheurer	Crime	Swiss-West German co-production
Nägel mit Köpfen	Wigbert Wicker	Rainer Grenkowitz, Claus Eberth, Karl Lieffen, Heinz Reincke, Klausjürgen Wussow	Crime comedy	a.k.a. 4 Männer und ein Kamel a.k.a. Vier Männer und ein Kamel
The Name of the Rose	Jean-Jacques Annaud	Sean Connery, Christian Slater, F. Murray Abraham, Ron Perlman, Helmut Qualtinger, Michael Lonsdale, Michael Habeck, Volker Prechtel, Valentina Vargas	Mystery	West German-Italian-French co-production
November Cats	Sigrun Koeppe	Angela Hunger, Ursela Monn, Katharina Brauren	Drama	
Now or Never	Christel Buschmann	Eva Mattes, Werner Stocker	Drama	a.k.a. Auf immer und ewig
Nuclear Conspiracy	Rainer Erler	Birgit Doll, Albert Fortell	Thriller	a.k.a. News Report on a Journey to a Bright Future
One Glance and Love Breaks Out	Jutta Brückner	Rosario Bléfari, Regina Lamm	Anthology	
Operation Dead End	Nikolai Müllerschön	Uwe Ochsenknecht, Hannes Jaenicke, Isabelle Willer, Anton Diffring, Hannelore Elsner, Günther Maria Halmer	Thriller	
Operation Nam	Fabrizio De Angelis	Oliver Tobias, Christopher Connelly, Manfred Lehmann, John Steiner, Ethan Wayne, Donald Pleasence	Action	a.k.a. Cobra Mission. Italian-West German co-production
Oranisches Tor	Lilly Grote	Shelley Hirsch, Martina Klemczak	Drama	
Orchideen des Wahnsinns	Nikolai Müllerschön	Diana Körner	Thriller	
Orpheus kehrt zurück	Peter Laemmle	Bobby McFerrin	Musical	
Paradise	Doris Dörrie	Katharina Thalbach, Heiner Lauterbach, Sunnyi Melles, Hanne Wieder	Drama	
Please, Let the Flowers Live	Duccio Tessari	Klausjürgen Wussow, Birgit Doll, Hannelore Elsner, Hans Christian Blech, Radost Bokel	Drama	
Der Polenweiher	Nico Hofmann	Wolf-Dietrich Sprenger, Gerhard Olschewski, Eberhard Feik, Ursula Cantieni, Britta Pohland, Heinz Meier	Crime, War	
Preis der Feigheit	Horst Flick	Ulrich Hoppe, Peter Aust	Crime	
Der Prinz	Sven Severin	Robert Düssler, Marcus Sauk	Drama	
Quadrille	Franz Josef Wild	Heidelinde Weis, Claudia Wedekind, Hartmut Reck, Heinz Ehrenfreund, Anita Kupsch	Comedy	
The Rebellion of the Hanged	Juan Luis Buñuel	Manuel Ojeda, Roberto Sosa, Fernando Balzaretti, Elena Sofia Ricci, Günther Maria Halmer, Uwe Ochsenknecht, Reiner Schöne, Jean-François Stévenin, Patricia Reyes Spíndola, Miguel Ángel Rodríguez, José Carlos Ruiz, Jorge Russek, Enrique Lucero	Drama	Mexican-French-West German co-production
Rosa Luxemburg	Margarethe von Trotta	Barbara Sukowa, Daniel Olbrychski, Otto Sander	Biography, War	Sukowa won Best Actress at the 1986 Cannes Film Festival
The Rose King	Werner Schroeter	Magdalena Montezuma, Mostéfa Djadjam, Antonio Orlando	Drama	French-West German-Portuguese-Dutch co-production
Rückfahrt in den Tod	Hans-Jürgen Tögel	Peter Bongartz, Iris Berben, Dominique Pinon	Thriller	a.k.a. Terminus
Runaway Horse	Peter Beauvais	Vadim Glowna, Rosel Zech	Drama	
Riff	Rolf S. Wolkenstein	Ed Cantu, Elektra De Salvo, Christophe Salengro	Drama	
The Romantic Sisters	Klaus Ickert	Roland Renner, Susanne Meierhofer, Vera Tschechowa, Karl Lieffen	Drama	
Santa Fe	Axel Corti	Gabriel Barylli, Ernst Stankovski, Monica Bleibtreu, Gideon Singer, Johannes Silberschneider	Drama, War	a.k.a. Where to and Back 2. Austrian-West German co-production
Säntis	Rainer Boldt	Vitus Zeplichal, Gunnar Möller	Crime comedy	
Schloss und Siegel	Heidi Ulmke	Christiane Carstens, Karl Heinz Maslo	Comedy	a.k.a. Schloß & Siegel
Seine letzte Chance	Alexander von Eschwege	Gerhard Olschewski, Jürgen Vogel	Crime	
The Silence of the Poet	Peter Lilienthal	Jakov Lind	Drama	a.k.a. The Continuing Silence of a Poet
Stammheim	Reinhard Hauff	Ulrich Tukur, Therese Affolter, Ulrich Pleitgen, Hans-Michael Rehberg	Docudrama	Won the Golden Bear at the 36th Berlin International Film Festival
Die Sterne schwindeln nicht	Helmut Kissel	Hartmut Reck, Johanna von Koczian	Comedy	
Stinkwut	Michael Verhoeven	Friedrich von Thun, Veronika Fitz, Christine Neubauer	Comedy	
Storm, der Schimmelreiter	Claudia Holldack	Erland Josephson, Till Topf	Biography	a.k.a. Theodor Storm
Die Stunde des Léon Bisquet	Lutz Büscher	Klaus Schwarzkopf, Beatrice Kessler, Hans Peter Hallwachs, Matthias Ponnier, Günter Mack	Drama	
Süchtig	Manfred Grunert	Michael König	Drama	
The Summer of the Samurai	Hans-Christoph Blumenberg	Cornelia Froboess, Hans Peter Hallwachs, Wojciech Pszoniak, Nadja Tiller	Crime	
Tarot	Rudolf Thome	Hanns Zischler, Rüdiger Vogler, Katharina Böhm, Vera Tschechowa	Drama	Entered into the 15th Moscow International Film Festival
Ticket to Rome	Vivian Naefe	Leslie Malton, Hanno Pöschl, Rainer Grenkowitz	Drama	
Time Of Silence	Thorsten Näter	Irina Hoppe, Pavel Sacher	Drama	
Totschweigen	Daniel Christoff	Peter Kollek, Kornelia Boje, Karin Anselm	Drama	
Tommaso Blu	Florian Furtwängler	Alessandro Haber	Drama	West German-Italian co-production
Die Torheiten des Ruhms	Hans Dieter Schwarze	Hanns Dieter Hüsch, Guntbert Warns	Comedy, History	
Das Totenreich	Karin Brandauer	Leslie Malton, Michael König, Vadim Glowna, Kurt Raab, Richard Münch	Drama	a.k.a. De Dødes Rige
The Two Faces of January	Wolfgang Storch	Charles Brauer, Yolande Gilot, Thomas Schücke	Thriller	
Transitträume	Hartmut Jahn, Peter Wensierski	Marita Marschall	Comedy	a.k.a. Dream On
The Understanding	Franz Peter Wirth	Heidelinde Weis, Karl-Heinz Vosgerau, Marion Kracht, Krista Stadler	Drama	a.k.a. Spätes Erröten
Der Unfried	Rainer Wolffhardt	Christine Neubauer	Drama	
Unser Haus reicht nur für drei	Oswald Döpke	Judy Winter, Sigfrit Steiner, Angela Salloker, Reinhard Glemnitz, Anja Jaenicke	Comedy	
Das unverhoffte Glück	Franz Josef Wild	Harald Leipnitz, Gerlinde Locker, Marie Theres Relin, Nikolaus Paryla	Comedy	
Va banque	Diethard Küster	Winfried Glatzeder, Grażyna Dyląg, Achim Reichel	Crime	
Vertrauen gegen Vertrauen	Marcus Scholz	Inge Meysel, Peter Striebeck, Manfred Lehmann, Pinkas Braun	Comedy	
A Virus Knows No Morals	Rosa von Praunheim	Rosa von Praunheim, Hella von Sinnen	Comedy	
Völkerschlachtdenkmal	Peter Deutsch	Heinz Schimmelpfennig	Drama	
Von Zwölf bis Mittag	Barbara Kappen	Nina Hoger, Helma Fehrmann, Reinhart Firchow, Hans Peter Korff	Drama	
Wahnfried	Peter Patzak	Otto Sander, Tatja Seibt, Christoph Waltz, Fabienne Babe, Anton Diffring	Biography, Music	Screened at the 1987 Cannes Film Festival
Die Walsche	Werner Masten	Marie Colbin, Lino Capolicchio, Remo Remotti, Hannes Thanheiser	Drama	West German-Italian-Austrian-Swiss co-production
Was zu beweisen war	Peter Weck	Martin Held	Crime comedy	
Wasser für die Blumen	Marcus Scholz	Claus Biederstaedt, Grit Boettcher, Winfried Glatzeder, Brigitte Mira, Anita Kupsch, Barbara Schöne	Comedy	
Weil's solche Liebe nicht täglich gibt	Frank Guthke	Christine Ostermayer, Peter Striebeck, Anja Franke	Drama	a.k.a. Weil's solche Liebe nicht tagtäglich gibt
Welcome in Vienna	Axel Corti	Gabriel Barylli, Claudia Messner, Nicolas Brieger, Karlheinz Hackl	Drama, War	a.k.a. Where to and Back 3. Austrian-West German co-production
Wiedergefundene Zeit	Jochen Richter	Adelheid Arndt, William Mang, Edgar M. Böhlke	Drama	
Der wilde Clown	Josef Rödl	Sigi Zimmerschied, Sunnyi Melles, Peter Kern	Drama	
Wilhelm Busch	Hartmut Griesmayr	Peter Ehrlich, Christiane Hörbiger, Rosemarie Fendel, Towje Kleiner, Jörg Hube, Tobias Moretti	Biography	a.k.a. Wer einsam ist, der hat es gut, weil keiner da, der ihm was tut
Der X-Bericht – Die geheime Mission des Ochsensepp	Roland Gall	Jörg Hube	War	
Zerbrochene Brücken	Franz Peter Wirth	Monika Woytowicz, Christian Wolff, Jürgen Schmidt, Rolf Becker, Maria Sebaldt, Alice Treff, Dietrich Mattausch, Charles Brauer, Eleonore Weisgerber, Evelyn Meyka, Helmut Zierl	Biography	a.k.a. Lily Braun – Memoiren einer Sozialistin
Zieh den Stecker raus, das Wasser kocht	Ephraim Kishon	Friedrich-Karl Praetorius, Ursela Monn, Herbert Bötticher, Wolfgang Kieling	Comedy	
Zischke	Martin Theo Krieger	David Strempel	Drama	
Zoning	Ulrich Krenkler	Hubertus Gertzen, Norbert Lamla, Dieter Meier, Eleonore Weisgerber	Crime	
Zwei Reisen mit Flesch	Klaus Dexel	Heiner Lauterbach, Marie-Charlott Schüler	Drama	
Zweikampf	Gert Steinheimer	Joachim Wichmann, Adolf Laimböck	Crime	

== 1987 ==
Title	Director	Cast	Genre	Notes
The Aggression	Theodor Kotulla	Michael König, Pascale Petit, Claude-Oliver Rudolph	Thriller	a.k.a. Der Angriff
Das andere Leben	Nicolas Gessner	Christiane Hörbiger, Dietrich Mattausch	Drama	
Anita: Dances of Vice	Rosa von Praunheim	Ina Blum	Biography	
Anna und Franz	Eberhard Itzenplitz	Christine Mayn, Daniel Friedrich	Comedy	
Aquaplaning	Eva Hiller	Werner Stocker, Martina Gedeck	Drama	
Arms and the Man	Max Peter Ammann	Emil Steinberger	Comedy	a.k.a. Helden. Swiss-West German-Austrian co-production.
Bagdad Café	Percy Adlon	Marianne Sägebrecht, C. C. H. Pounder, Jack Palance	Comedy	a.k.a. Out of Rosenheim
Bang! You're Dead!	Adolf Winkelmann	Ingolf Lück, Rebecca Pauly, Hermann Lause	Spy comedy	
Between Heaven and Earth	Thomas Engel	Katja Flint, Ralph Schicha, Andreas Seyferth, Gustáv Valach, Andrej Hryc, Ľudovít Kroner	Drama	West German-Czechoslovak co-production
Cargo	Michael Gutmann	Stefan Wood	Drama	
Changeling	Sohrab Shahid-Saless	Friederike Brüheim, Katharina Bacarelli, Henning Gissel	Drama	a.k.a. Wechselbalg
Die Chinesen kommen	Manfred Stelzer	Jörg Hube, Hans Brenner, Monika Baumgartner, Martin Sperr, Rolf Zacher	Comedy	
Cobra Verde	Werner Herzog	Klaus Kinski	Drama	
The Colony	Orlando Lübbert	Michael Degen, Grischa Huber	Drama	
Concerto for the Right Hand	Michael Bartlett	Miklos Königer	Black comedy, Music	
The Cry of the Owl	Tom Toelle	Matthias Habich, Birgit Doll, Jacques Breuer, Hans Christian Blech, Doris Kunstmann	Thriller	
Da Capo	Bernd Schroeder	Verena Buss	Drama	
Dann ist nichts mehr wie vorher	Gerd Roman Frosch	Zacharias Preen, Barbara Rudnik, Karin Baal, Heinz Hoenig, Christoph M. Ohrt	Drama	a.k.a. Then Nothing Is the Same Anymore
Days to Remember	Jeanine Meerapfel	Barbara Sukowa, Horst-Günter Marx	Drama	a.k.a. Die Verliebten. Entered into the 37th Berlin International Film Festival
The Death of Empedocles	Straub–Huillet	Andreas von Rauch	Drama	
Death Stone	Franz Josef Gottlieb	Heather Thomas, Elke Sommer, Brad Harris, Tony Kendall, Siegfried Rauch	Action, Drama	
Deshima	Beat Kuert	Marius Müller-Westernhagen, Kaho Minami, Leon Askin, Miyoko Akaza	Drama	Swiss-West German-Japanese co-production
Devil's Paradise	Vadim Glowna	Jürgen Prochnow, Sam Waterston, Suzanna Hamilton, Mario Adorf, Dominique Pinon, Ingrid Caven	Drama, Adventure	a.k.a. Victory
The Distant Land	Luc Bondy	Michel Piccoli, Bulle Ogier	Drama	a.k.a. Far and Wide a.k.a. Undiscovered Country. West German-French-Austrian co-production
Dolly, Lotte and Maria	Rosa von Praunheim	Dolly Haas, Lotte Goslar, Maria Ley-Piscator	Documentary	
Dragon Chow	Jan Schütte	Bhasker Patel, Ric Young	Drama	West German-Swiss co-production
Drohung bei Mondlicht	Wilm ten Haaf	Peter Fricke	Thriller	a.k.a. The Man Upstairs
Duo Valentianos	Gertrud Pinkus	Gilles Lotthe, Margarete Wiedstruck, Angelika Bartsch	Drama	
Empty World	Wolfgang Panzer	Tilman Schaich	Science fiction	
Die Erbschaft	Wolfgang Luderer	Inge Meysel, Günter Lamprecht, Hans Peter Korff, Angelika Bender, Jörg Pleva, Anke Sevenich	Comedy	
Erloschene Zeiten	Krzysztof Zanussi	Elisabeth Trissenaar, Mathieu Carrière, Maja Komorowska	Docudrama	
Evelyn und die Männer	Rolf von Sydow	Evelyn Hamann, Loriot, Rüdiger Vogler, Jörg Pleva, Ruth Maria Kubitschek, Hans Clarin, Diether Krebs	Comedy, Anthology	
Der Fälscher	Rolf von Sydow	Carl-Heinz Schroth, Simone Rethel, Peter Pasetti, Michael Lesch	Crime comedy	
Flohr und die Traumfrau	Günter Gräwert	Heidelinde Weis, Siegfried Lowitz	Comedy	
Francesca	Vérénice Rudolph	Eva Lissa, Dorothea Neff, Ruth Drexel, Pietro Tordi, Marianne Hoppe, Bernhard Minetti	Mockumentary	
Fräulein Else	Hans-Jürgen Syberberg	Edith Clever	Drama	
Friedenspolka	Rolf Hädrich	Eva Renzi, Pinkas Braun, Gert Westphal	Drama	
Früh auf, spät nieder	Susanne Abel, Rudolf Oshege	Dietmar Bär	Drama	
Gambit	Peter F. Bringmann	Despina Pajanou, Rolf Zacher, Dominic Raacke, Max Tidof, Heinz Bennent, Werner Kreindl	Thriller	
Gegen die Regel	Michael Verhoeven	Günter Lamprecht, Helmut Zierl	Drama	
Gelbe Sorte	Robert Bramkamp	Josef Drees, Cristin König	Drama	
The Gentle Hook	Günter Gräwert	Gila von Weitershausen, Hans Caninenberg, Peer Augustinski	Thriller	a.k.a. Dies Bildnis ist zum Morden schön
Eine geschlossene Gesellschaft	Heinrich Breloer	Ernst Jacobi	Docudrama	
The Girl with the Lighters	Ralf Huettner	Rupert J. Seidel, Stefan Wood, Enrico Boetcher, Arnold Frühwald	Comedy	a.k.a. Cripples Go Christmas
The Glass Sky	Nina Grosse	Helmut Berger, Sylvie Orcier	Drama	
Gunda's Father	Michael Verhoeven	Karin Thaler, Karl Scheydt, Monika Baumgartner, Wilfried Klaus	Drama	
Das Haus im Nebel	Oswald Döpke	Peter Sattmann, Wolfgang Müller, Daniela Ziegler, Sissy Höfferer	Thriller	a.k.a. Time to Speak
Helsinki Napoli All Night Long	Mika Kaurismäki	Kari Väänänen, Roberta Manfredi, Eddie Constantine, Samuel Fuller	Comedy thriller	Finnish-West German-Swiss co-production
Hollywood-Monster	Roland Emmerich	Jason Lively, Paul Gleason, Chuck Mitchell	Comedy	a.k.a. Ghost Chase. West German-American co-production
The Hothouse	Peter Goedel	Christian Doermer, Jörg Hube, Hanns Zischler	Drama	a.k.a. Das Treibhaus
In der Wüste	Rafael Fuster Pardo	Claudio Caceres Molina, Mustafa Saygili	Drama	
Kein Glück mit Frauen	Norbert Ehry	Jürgen Arndt, Jessica Kosmalla	Drama	
Kinder aus Stein	Volker Maria Arend	Natja Brunckhorst, Claude-Oliver Rudolph	Crime	a.k.a. Children Made of Stone
Die Klette	Herbert Ballmann	Désirée Nosbusch, Peter Sattmann	Drama	
Komplizinnen	Margit Czenki	Pola Kinski, Therese Affolter, Ilse Pagé, Marianne Rosenberg	Drama	
Kunyonga: Murder in Africa	Hubert Frank	Ron Williams, Werner Kreindl, Christoph Eichhorn	Action	
Lang soll er leben	Wolf Dietrich	Carl-Heinz Schroth, Anita Lochner, Wolfgang Preiss	Drama	
Lethal Obsession	Peter Patzak	Peter Maffay, Michael York, Armin Mueller-Stahl, Elliott Gould, Tahnee Welch	Action, Drama	a.k.a. Der Joker
The Little Prosecutor	Hark Bohm	Hark Bohm, Martin Lüttge	Drama	
Lockwood Desert, Nevada	Hans Noever	Tobias Hoesl	Crime	
Löhners Paula	Anna Kersting	Anne Wehner-Bachschmidt	Drama	
Losers	Bernd Schadewald	Ralf Richter, Mario Irrek, Campino	Drama	
The Madonna Man	Hans-Christoph Blumenberg	Marius Müller-Westernhagen, Renée Soutendijk, Michael Lonsdale, Peter Kraus	Thriller	a.k.a. Operation Madonna
Magic Sticks	Peter Keglevic	George Kranz, Kelly Curtis, Chico Hamilton	Music	
Maschenka	John Goldschmidt	Cary Elwes, Irina Brook, Freddie Jones, Sunnyi Melles, Lena Stolze, Jean-Claude Brialy, Michael Gough	Drama	British-West German-French-Finnish co-production
Die Menagerie von Sanssouci	Jens-Peter Behrend	Friedhelm Ptok, Joachim Bliese, Klaus Schwarzkopf	Comedy, Biography	
Miele	Hansgünther Heyme	Inge Andersen, Angelika Hurwicz	Drama	a.k.a. Miele – Ein Charakterbild
Minipli	Peter Voiss	Katinka Hoffmann, Martin Maria Abram, Walo Lüönd, Diether Krebs	Comedy	
Eine Minute Dunkel macht uns nicht blind	Susanne Zanke	Gertrud Roll	Drama, War	Austrian-West German co-production
Nächtliche Schatten	Hagen Mueller-Stahl	Barbara Freier, Christiane Lemm, Claudia Butenuth	Thriller	a.k.a. Night Shade
Nebel im Fjord	Eberhard Itzenplitz	Hannes Jaenicke, Hans Korte, Rosel Zech, Kjersti Døvigen, Janne Kokkin, Kjell Stormoen, Even Stormoen	Drama, War	a.k.a. Nebel im Fjord der Lachse
Nichts ist, wie es ist	Karl Heinz Kramberg	Rita Russek, Christiane-Bettina Pfannkuch, Miroslav Nemec	Drama	
Ohne Lizenz	Ralph Bridle	Rainer Friedrichsen, Ursela Monn, Bernd Tauber, Rolf Becker, Ulrich Matschoss	Crime	
Ossegg oder Die Wahrheit über Hänsel und Gretel	Thees Klahn	Jean-Pierre Léaud, Hark Bohm, Alfred Edel	Comedy	
Otto: The New Movie	Xaver Schwarzenberger, Otto Waalkes	Otto Waalkes, Anja Jaenicke, Dirk Dautzenberg, Friedrich Schoenfelder	Comedy	Most popular film of the year with 6.4 million admissions
Our Man in the Jungle	Rudolf Steiner, Peter Stripp	Armin Mueller-Stahl, Katja Rupé	Adventure	a.k.a. Amazonas Mission
Die Pauschalreise	Dieter Ehlers	Chonticha Tichachat, Klaus Volk, Baldur Seifert, Elke Heidenreich	Comedy	
Pseudo	Burkhard Steger	Birol Ünel	Drama	
Das rauhe Leben	Heide Pils	Erwin Leder	Drama	Austrian-West German co-production
Reichshauptstadt – privat	Horst Königstein	Ruth Niehaus, Heinz Baumann, Rolf Becker	War, Docudrama, Music	
Eine Reise nach Deutschland	Heidi Genée	Hannes Jaenicke, Heike Faber	Drama	a.k.a. Reise nach Deutschland – Eine deutsch-deutsche Romanze
Das runde Ding vom Odenwald	Helmut Kissel	Claus Berlinghof, Klaus Höhne, Joost Siedhoff	Comedy	
Sansibar oder der letzte Grund	Bernhard Wicki	Peter Kremer, Michael Gwisdek, Peter Sodann	Drama	a.k.a. Flight to Afar. East German-West German co-production
Schiefweg	Jo Baier	Daniela Schötz	Biography	a.k.a. Schiefweg – Emerenz Meier
Schlange, Herz und Pantherkopf	Rainer Wolffhardt	Joachim Bißmeier	Crime	
Schlüsselblumen	Stephan Meyer	Winfried Glatzeder, Erika Skrotzki, Mechthild Großmann, Richard Münch	Cold War spy film	
Sentimental Journey	Peter Patzak	Otto Sander, Kristin Scott Thomas, Jean-Pierre Cassel	Drama	
Sierra Leone	Uwe Schrader	Christian Redl, Ann-Gisel Glass, Rita Russek, Constanze Engelbrecht	Drama	
A Slip of the Disc	Franz Josef Gottlieb	Susanne Uhlen, Helmut Fischer, Herbert Herrmann, Hans Clarin	Comedy	a.k.a. Hexenschuß a.k.a. Hexenschuss
The Smile at the Foot of the Ladder	Jutta Netzsch	Frieder Nögge, Wilfried Baasner, Marianne Sägebrecht	Drama	
Sommer in Lesmona	Peter Beauvais	Katja Riemann, Benedict Freitag, Alexander Radszun, Richard Münch, Gila von Weitershausen, Siemen Rühaak, Stephan Schwartz	Drama	Short edited version of the eponymous TV series
Storms in May	Xaver Schwarzenberger	Gabriel Barylli, Claudia Messner	Drama	a.k.a. Gewitter im Mai. Austrian-West German co-production
Ein Stück vom Glück	Johann Schmid	Vitus Zeplichal, Sabina Trooger, Grete Wurm	Drama	
Sturmflut	Lutz Büscher	Jörg Pleva, Susanne Beck, Hildegard Krekel, Dietrich Mattausch	Disaster, Docudrama	
Taxi nach Kairo	Frank Ripploh	Frank Ripploh, Christine Neubauer	Comedy	a.k.a. Taxi to Cairo
Three Crazy Jerks	Franz Josef Gottlieb	Thomas Gottschalk, Michael Winslow, Helmut Fischer, Dey Young	Comedy	a.k.a. Lovable Zanies
Tot oder lebendig	Gisela Zimmermann	Ludwig Hirsch, Wolfgang Büttner	Mystery	
The Tribulations of a Chinese Gentleman	Wu Yigong	Chen Peisi, Rosalind Chao, Rolf Hoppe	Comedy	Chinese-West German co-production
Der Unsichtbare	Ulf Miehe	Klaus Wennemann, Barbara Rudnik, Nena	Comedy, Fantasy	a.k.a. The Invisible Man
Vicky und Nicky	Franz Josef Gottlieb	Brigitte Mira	Comedy	a.k.a. Vicky and Nicky a.k.a. Vicky & Nicky
Von Frau zu Frau	Ralf Gregan	Simone Rethel, Susanne Uhlen, Heiner Lauterbach	Comedy	
Das Wahlergebnis	Joachim Roering	Michael Degen, Volkert Kraeft, Rosemarie Fendel, Gerd Baltus, Uwe Friedrichsen, Jörg Pleva, Rainer Hunold	Comedy, Mockumentary	
Wanderer zwischen beiden Welten	Karl Heinz Kramberg	Christoph Eichhorn, Wilfried Klaus, Peter Lühr	Drama	
Wann, wenn nicht jetzt	Michael Juncker	Friedrich von Thun, Hans Peter Hallwachs, Gudrun Gabriel, Hannelore Schroth	Comedy	
Warten auf Marie	Gisela Stelly	Hildegard Schmahl, Juliane Dibbern, Eva-Maria Hagen, Hermann Lause	Drama	
We Are Utopia	Dagmar Damek	Michael König, Alexander Radszun	Drama	a.k.a. We Are God's Utopia
Wer ist dran?	Hartmut Griesmayr	Rosemarie Fendel, Heinz Reincke	Drama	
Wer lacht schon über Rosemann	Michael Günther	Michael Degen, Heike Faber	Comedy	
Der Werwolf von W.	Manfred Müller	Henry Hübchen, Michael Gwisdek	Mystery	
Wings of Desire	Wim Wenders	Bruno Ganz, Otto Sander, Peter Falk, Solveig Dommartin, Curt Bois	Drama	a.k.a. Der Himmel über Berlin. Won the Best Director Award at the 1987 Cannes Film Festival
The Winner Takes All	Marianne Lüdcke	Gottfried John, Elisabeth Trissenaar, Bernhard Wicki	Drama	a.k.a. Pattberg's Legacy
Das zweite Leben Joseph Haydns	Peter Laemmle	Paul Mühlhauser	Biography, Music	

== 1988 ==
Title	Director	Cast	Genre	Notes
A.D.A.M.	Herbert Ballmann	Désirée Nosbusch, Helmut Berger	Comedy	
Adrian und die Römer	Klaus Bueb, Thomas Mauch	Klaus Bueb, Gertraud Jesserer, Katharina Abt, Gert Haucke, Sabine von Maydell	Comedy	
The Adventures of Baron Munchausen	Terry Gilliam	John Neville, Sarah Polley, Eric Idle, Jonathan Pryce, Oliver Reed, Uma Thurman, Robin Williams	Fantasy adventure	British-American-West German co-production
Anna	Frank Strecker	Silvia Seidel, Patrick Bach, Anton Diffring	Musical	Sequel of the TV miniseries Anna
Appointment with Yesterday	Wolf Gremm	Ruth Maria Kubitschek, Ferdy Mayne, Dietrich Mattausch, Heidi Brühl, Brigitte Mira, Brigitte Grothum	Thriller	a.k.a. Im Schatten der Angst
Autumn Milk	Joseph Vilsmaier	Dana Vávrová, Werner Stocker	Drama	
Ballhaus Barmbek: Let's Kiss and Say Goodbye	Christel Buschmann	Nico, Ulrich Tukur, Zazie de Paris, Jörg Pfennigwerth, Kiev Stingl	Musical	
Bei Thea	Dominik Graf	Hannes Jaenicke, Marianne Hoppe, Ida Ehre	Drama	
Beule	Ralf Gregan	Diether Krebs, Peter Bongartz, Dirk Dautzenberg, Towje Kleiner, Ursula Karven, Oliver Stritzel	Crime comedy	a.k.a. Beule oder Wie man einen Tresor knackt
Die Beute	Dominik Graf	Martina Gedeck, Hannes Jaenicke	Crime	
The Black Obelisk	Peter Deutsch	Udo Schenk, Rainer Hunold, Karina Thayenthal	Drama	a.k.a. Der schwarze Obelisk
The Bomb	Christian Görlitz	Michael Degen, Rolf Becker, Matthias Fuchs, Rosel Zech	Thriller, Disaster	
The Boss from the West	Vivian Naefe	Barbara Auer, Alexander Radszun, Eberhard Feik	Comedy	
Burning Beds	Pia Frankenberg	Ian Dury, Pia Frankenberg	Comedy	
Burning Secret	Andrew Birkin	Klaus Maria Brandauer, Faye Dunaway	Drama	West German-British co-production
The Case of Mr. Spalt	René Perraudin	Otto Sander, Katharina Thalbach, Rolf Zacher	Anthology, Comedy	
The Cat	Dominik Graf	Götz George, Gudrun Landgrebe, Heinz Hoenig, Ralf Richter	Crime thriller	
Chimeras	Nico Hofmann	Hans Peter Hallwachs	Science fiction	
The Commander	Antonio Margheriti	Lewis Collins, Lee Van Cleef, Donald Pleasence	Action	Italian-West German co-production
Crash	Tom Toelle	Matthias Habich, Corinne Touzet	Drama	
The Curse	Ralf Huettner	Dominic Raacke, Barbara May	Horror	
Cycling the Frame	Cynthia Beatt	Tilda Swinton	Short	
Family Skeletons	Franz Peter Wirth	Hannes Jaenicke, Constanze Engelbrecht, Peter Sattmann, Friedrich von Thun, Helmut Zierl, Despina Pajanou, Evelyn Opela	Thriller	a.k.a. Familienschande
A Father's Revenge	John Herzfeld	Brian Dennehy, Ron Silver, Joanna Cassidy, Christoph M. Ohrt	Thriller	American-West German co-production
Faust	Dieter Dorn	Helmut Griem, Romuald Pekny, Sunnyi Melles, Cornelia Froboess	Drama	
Felix	Margarethe von Trotta, Helma Sanders-Brahms, Helke Sander, Christel Buschmann	Ulrich Tukur	Anthology, Comedy	
Fifty-Fifty	Peter Timm	Heinz Hoenig, Dominique Horwitz, Suzanne von Borsody	Crime comedy	
The French as Seen by...	Werner Herzog		Short	
Geheime Reichssache	Michael Kehlmann	Alexander Kerst, Hans Schulze, Michael Degen, Werner Pochath	Docudrama, War	
The Girlfriend	Jeanine Meerapfel	Liv Ullmann, Cipe Lincovsky	Drama	a.k.a. La amiga. Argentine-West German co-production
Hanussen	István Szabó	Klaus Maria Brandauer, Erland Josephson	Drama	West German-Hungarian co-production
Hell Hunters	Ernst R. von Theumer	Maud Adams, Stewart Granger, George Lazenby	Exploitation	a.k.a. Rage to Kill. West German-American co-production
Herbst in Lugano	Ulrich Stark	O. W. Fischer, Maria Schell, Liselotte Pulver	Anthology	a.k.a. Autumn in Lugano
Ignaz Semmelweis – Arzt der Frauen	Michael Verhoeven	Heiner Lauterbach	Biography	a.k.a. Ignaz Semmelweis, Gynecologist. West German-Hungarian-Austrian co-production
In guten Händen	Rolf von Sydow	Rainer Hunold, Helmut Berger, Anke Sevenich, Günter Mack, Peter Pasetti	Thriller	
Incident at Twilight	August Everding	Mario Adorf, Horst Bollmann	Crime	a.k.a. One Autumn Evening
Innocence Unknown	Hans Neuenfels	Klaus Maria Brandauer, Elisabeth Trissenaar, Bernhard Minetti, Hans-Michael Rehberg, Mathieu Carrière	Drama	a.k.a. Europa und der zweite Apfel
Judgment in Berlin	Leo Penn	Martin Sheen, Sam Wanamaker, Jutta Speidel, Heinz Hoenig	Drama	American-West German co-production
The Kiss of the Tiger	Petra Haffter	Beate Jensen, Stéphane Ferrara	Thriller	West German-French co-production
Der Knick – Die Geschichte einer Wunderheilung	Joachim Roering	Peter Bongartz, Claudia Demarmels, Peter Pasetti, Rolf Becker	Comedy	
Das Königsstechen	Gedeon Kovács	Sigfrit Steiner, Lisa Helwig, Hans Madin, Georg Lehn	Comedy	
Der Krähenbaum	Frank Guthke	Holger Hartung, Christoph Wendelmuth, Florian Schmidt-Foß, Ilona Grübel, Ruth Hausmeister	War	
Land der Väter, Land der Söhne	Nico Hofmann	Karl-Heinz von Liebezeit	Drama, War	
Lenin...The Train	Damiano Damiani	Ben Kingsley, Leslie Caron, Dominique Sanda	Historical drama	Italian-West German-Austrian-French-Spanish co-production
Die letzte Fahrt der San Diego	Oswald Döpke	Siegfried Wischnewski, Evelyn Hamann, Karin Anselm, Katerina Jacob	Crime	
Liebe ist stärker als der Tod	Juraj Herz	Gigi Proietti, Éléonore Klarwein	Drama	
Linie 1	Reinhard Hauff	Inka Groetschel, Rainer Strecker, Dieter Landuris, Petra Zieser	Musical	
Der Lockspitzel	Michael Lähn	Tilo Prückner, Vadim Glowna, Rita Russek	Crime	
Love and Fear	Margarethe von Trotta	Fanny Ardant, Greta Scacchi, Valeria Golino	Drama	a.k.a. Three Sisters. French-Italian-West German co-production. Entered into the 1988 Cannes Film Festival
Man spricht deutsh	Hanns Christian Müller	Gerhard Polt, Gisela Schneeberger, Dieter Hildebrandt, Werner Schneyder, Pamela Prati, Enzo Cannavale	Comedy	
Manöver	Helma Sanders-Brahms	Johannes Herrschmann, Adriana Altaras, Alfred Edel	Comedy	
Marienthal: The Sociography of an Unemployed Community	Karin Brandauer	Franziska Walser, August Schmölzer, Inge Maux	Drama	a.k.a. Einstweilen wird es Mittag. Austrian-West German co-production
Martha Jellneck	Kai Wessel	Heidemarie Hatheyer, Dominique Horwitz, Ulrich Matschoss	Drama	
Me and Him	Doris Dörrie	Griffin Dunne, Ellen Greene, Carey Lowell, Craig T. Nelson	Comedy	West German-American co-production
Michas Flucht	Claus Peter Witt	Martin May, Dieter Kirchlechner, Witta Pohl	Drama	
The Microscope	Rudolf Thome	Vladimir Weigl, Adriana Altaras, Małgorzata Gebel	Comedy	
Midnight Cop	Peter Patzak	Morgan Fairchild, Armin Mueller-Stahl, Michael York, Frank Stallone	Thriller	a.k.a. Killing Blue
Mother's Mask	Christoph Schlingensief	Karl Friedrich Mews, Helge Schneider, Udo Kier	Drama	
Münchhausens letzte Liebe	Wolfgang Glück	Hans-Joachim Kulenkampff, Anne Tismer, Peter Pasetti, Walter Buschhoff, Gunnar Möller	Drama	
Nachsaison	Wolfram Paulus	Albert Paulus, Mercedes Echerer, Günther Maria Halmer, Daniela Obermeir	Drama	a.k.a. Off Season. Austrian-West German co-production
Die Nacht des Marders	Maria Theresia Wagner	Annamirl Bierbichler, Franz Buchrieser, Claus Eberth	Drama	
Ein naheliegender Mord	Oliver Storz	Michael Roll, Iris Berben, Peter Sattmann	Crime	
Nekromantik	Jörg Buttgereit	Daktari Lorenz, Beatrice Manowski	Horror	
Notwehr	Peter Schulze-Rohr	Uwe Ochsenknecht	Thriller	
Ödipussi	Loriot	Loriot, Evelyn Hamann	Comedy	
An Odd Couple	Peter Keglevic	Judy Winter, Diego Wallraff, Karl Michael Vogler	Drama	a.k.a. Ein ungleiches Paar
Old Times	Krzysztof Zanussi	Heidelinde Weis, Vadim Glowna, Gundi Ellert	Drama	a.k.a. Alte Zeiten
The Passenger – Welcome to Germany	Thomas Brasch	Tony Curtis, Katharina Thalbach, Matthias Habich, Alexandra Stewart, Charles Régnier, Karin Baal, Irm Hermann, George Tabori	Drama	Entered into the 1988 Cannes Film Festival
Pizza Express	Vivian Naefe	Bettina Kupfer, August Zirner, Hannelore Elsner	Crime comedy	
Plaza Real	Herbert Vesely	Mia Nygren, Jon Finch	Drama	
The Post Office Girl	Édouard Molinaro	Évelyne Bouix, Mario Adorf, Niels Arestrup, Vera Tschechowa	Drama	a.k.a. Rausch der Verwandlung. French-West German co-production
Der Professor und sein Hund	Wolf Dietrich	Carl-Heinz Schroth	Comedy	
Quicker Than the Eye	Nicolas Gessner	Ben Gazzara, Mary Crosby, Jean Yanne, Ivan Desny, Christoph Waltz	Thriller	Swiss-Austrian-West German-French co-production
Red Roses for a Call Girl	Bobby A. Suarez	Maria Isabel Lopez, Robert Marius, Werner Pochath, Julia Kent, Manfred Seipold	Drama	a.k.a. Rose Tattoo a.k.a. Manila Tattoo. Philippine-West German co-production
Reise ohne Auftrag	Friedemann Schulz	Christian Brückner, Karl Michael Vogler	Drama	
Rosinenbomber	Eberhard Itzenplitz	Carl Raddatz, Rüdiger Kirschstein, Barbara Schöne, Rolf Zacher, Ernst Stankovski	Drama	
Schloß Königswald	Peter Schamoni	Camilla Horn, Marika Rökk, Marianne Hoppe, Carola Höhn, Dietlinde Turban, Anja Kruse	War, Comedy	a.k.a. Schloss Königswald
Schmetterlinge	Wolfgang Becker	Bertram von Boxberg	Drama	a.k.a. Butterflies
Schön war die Zeit	Klaus Gietinger, Leo Hiemer	Gottfried John, Edgar Selge, Ewa Błaszczyk	Drama	
Der schöne Mann	Marianne Lüdcke	Max Volkert Martens, Franziska Walser, Beate Jensen	Drama	
Singles	Eckehard Ziedrich	Helmut Zierl, Claudia Demarmels	Comedy	
Sleepless Nights	Marcel Gisler	Rudolf Nadler	Drama	
Spätes Glück nicht ausgeschlossen	Franz Josef Gottlieb	Inge Meysel, Carl-Heinz Schroth, Ursela Monn	Comedy	
Starke Zeiten	Otto Retzer, Rolf Olsen, Sigi Rothemund	Dey Young, David Hasselhoff, Michael Winslow, Rudi Carrell, Hans-Joachim Kulenkampff, Karl Dall	Comedy, Anthology	a.k.a. Strong Times
Stowaways on the Ark	Wolfgang Urchs	—N/a	Animated	
The Summer of the Hawk	Arend Agthe	Janos Crecelius, Andrea Lösch, Rolf Zacher, Hermann Lause	Family, Adventure	
Three D	Sönke Wortmann	Michael Schreiner, Katharina Müller-Elmau	Comedy	
Torquemada	Stanislav Barabáš	Francisco Rabal, Jacques Breuer, Michel Auclair, Dietmar Schönherr, Constanze Engelbrecht, Rainer Hunold	Biography	a.k.a. Darkness Covers the Earth a.k.a. The Inquisitors. West German-British-Spanish-French-Portuguese co-production
A Touch of Danger	Franz Josef Gottlieb	Armin Mueller-Stahl, Iris Berben, Hans Clarin	Thriller	a.k.a. Tagebuch für einen Mörder
Das Traumauto	Hajo Gies	Ralf Komorr, Maria Ketikidou, Klaus Herm, Erich Bar, Elisabeth Volkmann, Towje Kleiner	Comedy	
Ein Treffen mit Rimbaud	Ernst-August Zurborn	Anke Sevenich, Sven Wollter, Hannelore Elsner	Crime	a.k.a. Encounter with Rimbaud
Trouble im Penthouse	Franz Josef Gottlieb	Susanne Uhlen, Herbert Herrmann, Harald Leipnitz, Chariklia Baxevanos, Hans Clarin, Brigitte Mira, Elisabeth Volkmann	Comedy	a.k.a. Tangled Web
Ein Unding der Liebe	Radu Gabrea	Erich Bar, Doris Kunstmann	Drama	a.k.a. An Absurdity of Love
The Venus Trap	Robert van Ackeren	Sonja Kirchberger, Hanns Zischler, Myriem Roussel, Horst-Günter Marx	Comedy	
Vergessen Sie's	C. Cay Wesnigk	Edgar M. Marcus	Thriller	
Das Viereck	Oliver Storz	Iris Berben, Towje Kleiner, Michael Roll, Monika Schwarz	Comedy	
Virgin Machine	Monika Treut	Ina Blum	Drama	
The Vulture Wally	Walter Bockmayer	Samy Orfgen, Elisabeth Volkmann, Ralph Morgenstern, Joy Fleming	Comedy, Music	
Wherever You Are...	Krzysztof Zanussi	Julian Sands, Renée Soutendijk	Drama	Polish-British-West German-French co-production
Why Is There Salt in the Sea?	Peter Beauvais	Nicolin Kunz, Siemen Rühaak	Drama	
Wieviel Liebe braucht der Mensch	Michael Günther	Gustl Bayrhammer	Drama	
The Winter Beach	Wolf Gremm	Ruth Maria Kubitschek, Ferdy Mayne, Heinz Baumann	Science fiction	a.k.a. Dem Tod auf der Spur
Das Winterhaus	Hilde Lermann	Marita Breuer, Rüdiger Vogler, Werner Kreindl, Elfriede Rückert	Drama	
Wohin?	Herbert Achternbusch	Gabi Geist, Josef Bierbichler, Kurt Raab	Drama	
Yasemin	Hark Bohm	Ayse Romey, Uwe Bohm	Drama	
Year of the Turtle	Ute Wieland	Heinz Bennent, Karina Fallenstein	Drama	
Der Zauberbaum	Martin Wiebel	Paulus Manker, Traugott Buhre, Rolf Illig	Drama	
Zimmer 36	Markus Fischer	Babett Arens, Peter Cieslinski, Anne-Marie Blanc	Thriller	Swiss-West German co-production

== 1989 ==
Title	Director	Cast	Genre	Notes
100 Years of Adolf Hitler: The Last Hour in the Führerbunker	Christoph Schlingensief	Udo Kier, Margit Carstensen, Alfred Edel, Volker Spengler	Drama, War	
Affäre Nachtfrost	Sigi Rothemund	Gudrun Landgrebe, Hansjörg Felmy	Thriller	
African Timber	Peter F. Bringmann	Heiner Lauterbach, Deborah Lacey, Julien Guiomar, Dietmar Schönherr, Charles Kofi Bucknor, Alexandra Duah, Fred Amugi	Thriller	
Alte Freundschaften	Thomas Fantl	Horst Bollmann, Diether Krebs, Thekla Carola Wied	Comedy	
Der Atem	Niklaus Schilling	Charles Brauer, Karina Fallenstein, Ian Moorse	Science fiction	a.k.a. The Spirit. West German-Swiss co-production
Die aufrichtige Lügnerin	Gerhard Klingenberg	Marina Krauser, Rudolf Bissegger, Judy Winter	Crime comedy	a.k.a. The Honest Liar a.k.a. A Shot in the Dark
Balance	Christoph Lauenstein, Wolfgang Lauenstein	—N/a	Short, Animated	Academy Award for Best Animated Short Film
Bangkok Story	Rolf von Sydow	Heiner Lauterbach, Günther Maria Halmer, Rolf Hoppe	Thriller	a.k.a. Killing Drugs
Berta Garlan	Peter Patzak	Birgit Doll, Kitty Speiser, Hans-Michael Rehberg, Riccardo De Torrebruna	Drama	Austrian-West German-Swiss co-production
Besuch	Cordula Trantow	Judy Winter, Wolfgang Reichmann	Thriller	
Black Past	Olaf Ittenbach	Olaf Ittenbach	Horror	
Black Sin	Straub-Huillet	Andreas von Rauch, Vladimir Baratta, Howard Vernon	Short	Screened at the 1989 Cannes Film Festival
Blue Eyed	Reinhard Hauff	Götz George, Miguel Ángel Solá	Drama	West German-Argentine co-production
Eine Bonner Affäre	Bernd Schadewald	Helmut Zierl, Gerhard Olschewski, Ursela Monn, Ulrich Pleitgen, Monika Baumgartner, Hark Bohm	Drama	
Boomerang Boomerang	Hans W. Geißendörfer	Jürgen Vogel, Katja Studt, Lambert Hamel, Jan Plewka	Crime	
The Break	Frank Beyer	Götz George, Rolf Hoppe, Otto Sander, Ulrike Krumbiegel	Crime	West German-East German co-production
C*A*S*H: A Political Fairy Tale	Norbert Kückelmann	Armin Mueller-Stahl, Rolf Zacher, Claudia Messner, Hans-Michael Rehberg	Comedy	a.k.a. Schweinegeld – Ein Märchen der Gebrüder Nimm
Clara	Jochen Richter	Thekla Carola Wied, Jürgen Schmidt, Christoph Eichhorn	Biography, Music	
Come into My Parlor	Gerhard Klingenberg	Judy Winter	Crime	a.k.a. Ich melde einen Selbstmord
The Dancer	Masahiro Shinoda	Hiromi Go, Lisa Wolf, Rolf Hoppe, Brigitte Grothum, Haruko Kato, Tsutomu Yamazaki, Christoph Eichhorn	Drama	a.k.a. 舞姫 a.k.a. Die Tänzerin. Japanese-West German co-production
Der Doppelgänger	Emanuel Boeck	Uwe Ochsenknecht, Simon Oates	Thriller	West German-Swiss co-production
Earthbound	Oliver Herbrich	Hannes Thanheiser, Vera Tschechowa, Rüdiger Vogler, Hark Bohm, Peter Radtke, Alfred Edel, Christian Doermer	Drama	a.k.a. Erdenschwer
Ede und das Kind	Jörg Grünler	Carl-Heinz Schroth	Crime comedy	
Ekkehard	Diethard Klante	Gabriel Barylli, Zdena Studenková, András Fricsay	Historical drama	Short edited version of the eponymous TV series
Er – Sie – Es	Sven Severin	Renan Demirkan, Helmut Berger, Lotti Huber, Vadim Glowna, Sissi Perlinger, Eberhard Feik	Comedy	
Europa, abends	Claudia Schröder	Christoph Moosbrugger, Eddie Constantine, Maja Maranow, Susanne Beck, Heinz Schubert, Matthias Fuchs	Science fiction	
Farewell to False Paradise	Tevfik Başer	Zuhal Olcay	Drama	
Follow Me	Maria Knilli	Pavel Landovský, Marina Vlady, Katharina Thalbach	Drama	Entered into the 16th Moscow International Film Festival
Fool's Mate	Mathieu Carrière	Michael Marwitz, Victoria Tennant	Drama	a.k.a. Zugzwang. Screened at the 1989 Cannes Film Festival
Francesco	Liliana Cavani	Mickey Rourke, Helena Bonham Carter, Andréa Ferréol, Mario Adorf, Hanns Zischler	Biography	Italian-West German co-production
Franta	Mathias Allary	Jan Kurbjuweit	Drama, War	a.k.a. Franta Zlin
Frei zum Abschuss	Manfred Grunert	William Mang, Hilmar Thate, Vera Tschechowa	Thriller	
Ein gemachter Mann	Manfred Grunert	Nikolaus Paryla, Grischa Huber, Leslie Malton	Comedy	
Das geregelte Leben der Gertie H.	Franz Josef Wild	Christa Berndl	Drama	
Giovanni oder Die Fährte der Frauen	Jochen Richter	Jörg Richter, Anja Kruse, Katja Flint, Alfred Edel, Juraj Kukura, Billie Zöckler	Comedy	
The Grass Is Greener Everywhere Else	Michael Klier	Mirosław Baka, Marta Klubowicz	Drama	a.k.a. Überall ist es besser, wo wir nicht sind
Gummibärchen küßt man nicht	Walter Bannert	Christopher Mitchum, Angela Alvarado, Draco Rosa, Ernest Borgnine, John Hillerman, Art Metrano	Comedy	a.k.a. Gummibärchen küsst man nicht a.k.a. Real Men Don't Eat Gummi Bears
Hard Days, Hard Nights	Horst Königstein	Wigald Boning, Rita Tushingham, Al Corley	Comedy, Music	
Herdsmen of the Sun	Werner Herzog		Documentary	
Die Hexe von Köln	Hagen Mueller-Stahl	Marita Breuer	Historical drama	
Himmelsheim	Manfred Stelzer	Elke Sommer, Sigi Zimmerschied, Hanns Zischler	Comedy	
Ich bin Elsa	Richard Blank	Marianne Hoppe	Comedy	
In der Stille ... Mord!	Sylvia Hoffman	Karin Anselm, Dietrich Mattausch, Ingmar Zeisberg, Jean Le Mouël, Alexander Kerst	Thriller	
Jede Menge Schmidt	Franz Josef Gottlieb	Helmut Fischer, Hans Clarin, Rita Russek, Loni von Friedl, Anja Schüte, Herbert Fux	Comedy	a.k.a. A Surfeit of Smiths
Jenseits von Blau	Christoph Eichhorn	Sarah Jane Denalane, Benjamin Kirsch, Karin Boyd, Peter Sattmann, Hans Peter Korff, Nina Hoger, Harald Juhnke, Charles Régnier	Fantasy	
Joan of Arc of Mongolia	Ulrike Ottinger	Delphine Seyrig, Gillian Scalici, Irm Hermann, Peter Kern	Drama	Entered into the 39th Berlin International Film Festival
Karambolage	Franz Peter Wirth	Iris Berben, Constanze Engelbrecht, Peter Sattmann, Volkert Kraeft	Comedy	
Killer kennen keine Furcht	Franz Josef Gottlieb	Robert Atzorn, Hans Clarin, Herbert Herrmann, Susanne Uhlen, Loni von Friedl, Rita Russek	Crime comedy	a.k.a. All Change
Der lange Sommer	Jochen Richter	Katja Flint, Thomas Schücke, Maurizio Crozza, Pietro Sarubbi, Enzo Iacchetti	Comedy	a.k.a. Corriger la fortune
Langusten	Rolf Hädrich	Agnes Fink	Drama	a.k.a. I Only Want an Answer
Laser Mission	BJ Davis	Brandon Lee, Ernest Borgnine, Werner Pochath	Action	American-West German-South African co-production
Last Exit to Brooklyn	Uli Edel	Jennifer Jason Leigh, Stephen Lang, Burt Young	Drama	West German-British co-production
Laurin	Robert Sigl	Dóra Szinetár	Mystery	West German-Hungarian co-production
Das Leben ein Alptraum	Mario Caiano	Roger Miremont, Lorenza Guerrieri, Günter Mack, Béla Ernyey	Thriller	a.k.a. La Vie en miettes. French-Italian-West German co-production
Der Leibwächter	Adolf Winkelmann	Franz Xaver Kroetz, Raymond Pellegrin, Hanns Zischler, Heinz Hoenig	Thriller	
Der letzte Gast	Hartmut Schoen	Karin Baal	Thriller	
Lockvögel	Rolf Silber	Winfried Glatzeder, Krista Posch	Comedy	
Maria von den Sternen	Thomas Mauch	Katja Junge, Robert Düssler, Heikko Deutschmann, Michael Lott	Drama	
Der Mitwisser	Ulrike Neulinger	Thomas Kretschmann, Joachim Bißmeier	Crime drama	
Money	Doris Dörrie	Billie Zöckler, Uwe Ochsenknecht, Sunnyi Melles, August Zirner	Comedy	
Murderers Among Us: The Simon Wiesenthal Story	Brian Gibson	Ben Kingsley, Renée Soutendijk	Biography	American-British-Hungarian-West German co-production
Noch ein Wunsch	Thomas Koerfer	Matthias Habich, Hannelore Elsner, Johanna Lier	Drama	Swiss-West German co-production
Officer Factory	Wolf Vollmar	Manfred Zapatka, Thomas Holtzmann, Karl Walter Diess, Sigmar Solbach, Rosel Zech, Eliška Balzerová	War	Short edited version of the TV series Fabrik der Offiziere
Otto: The Alien from East Frisia	Otto Waalkes, Marijan David Vajda	Otto Waalkes, Hans Peter Hallwachs, Barbara May	Comedy	
The Philosopher	Rudolf Thome	Johannes Herrschmann, Adriana Altaras, Friederike Tiefenbacher, Claudia Matschulla	Comedy	
The Play with Billions	Peter Keglevic	Ulrich Tukur, Barbara Auer, Friedrich von Thun, Hans Christian Blech, Vadim Glowna	Drama	a.k.a. Das Milliardenspiel a.k.a. They Play with Billions
Ein Prachtexemplar	Bruno Jonas	Stephan Schwartz, Hans Korte	Comedy	
Quarantine	Nico Hofmann	Günther Maria Halmer, Renan Demirkan, Ulrich Matschoss, Ben Becker	Disaster	
Reunion	Jerry Schatzberg	Jason Robards, Françoise Fabian, Samuel West, Christien Anholt	Drama	British-French-West German co-production
RobbyKallePaul	Dani Levy	Dani Levy, Frank Beilicke, Josef Hofmann, Maria Schrader, Anja Franke	Comedy	a.k.a. Robby, Kalle, Paul. West German-Swiss co-production
Rosalie Goes Shopping	Percy Adlon	Marianne Sägebrecht, Brad Davis, Judge Reinhold	Comedy	Entered into the 1989 Cannes Film Festival
The Rose Garden	Fons Rademakers	Liv Ullmann, Maximilian Schell, Peter Fonda, Jan Niklas, Hanns Zischler	Drama	American-West German-Austrian co-production
Schuldig	Michael Mackenroth	Klaus Wennemann, Ulrike Kriener	Drama	
Schulz & Schulz	Ilse Hofmann	Götz George, Martina Gedeck, Klaus J. Behrendt	Comedy	a.k.a. Schulz und Schulz
Schwarzenberg	Eberhard Itzenplitz	Max Tidof, Ulrich Pleitgen, Thomas Heinze	War	
Sealed in Salt	Rainer Wolffhardt	Michael Roll, Patricia Adriani, Rolf Illig	Drama	a.k.a. Der Mann im Salz. Austrian-West German-Czechoslovak co-production
Seven Minutes	Klaus Maria Brandauer	Klaus Maria Brandauer, Brian Dennehy	Drama, War	a.k.a. Georg Elser – Einer aus Deutschland
Seven Women	Rudolf Thome	Johannes Herrschmann, Adriana Altaras	Comedy	a.k.a. 7 Women
Sievers wartet!	Niki Stein	Uwe Friedrichsen, Siemen Rühaak	Comedy	
Silence Like Glass	Carl Schenkel	Jami Gertz, Martha Plimpton, George Peppard	Drama	a.k.a. Two Women. West German-American co-production
Ein Sohn aus gutem Hause	Karin Brandauer	Alexander Lutz, Angelica Ladurner, Georg Friedrich, Felix von Manteuffel, Ewa Błaszczyk, Rolf Boysen, Walter Schmidinger	Drama	Austrian-West German co-production
Souterrain	Xaver Schwarzenberger	Claudia Messner, August Schmölzer	Drama	Austrian-West German co-production
The Sparrow Murderer	Wolf Gremm	Paul Cabanis, Hans Clarin, Robert Atzorn, Anita Kupsch, Eberhard Feik	Thriller	
Spider's Web	Bernhard Wicki	Ulrich Mühe, Klaus Maria Brandauer, Armin Mueller-Stahl, Andrea Jonasson, Corinna Kirchhoff	Drama	Entered into the 1989 Cannes Film Festival
The State Chancellery	Heinrich Breloer	Roland Schäfer, Hermann Lause, Dietrich Mattausch, Grischa Huber, Burghart Klaußner	Docudrama	a.k.a. Die Staatskanzlei – Barschels Fall
The Story Teller	Rainer Boldt	Udo Schenk, Anke Sevenich, Christine Kaufmann, Peter Sattmann	Thriller	a.k.a. A Suspension of Mercy a.k.a. Der Geschichtenerzähler
Sturzflug	Thorsten Näter	Wilfried Dziallas, Wolfgang Finck	Drama	a.k.a. Nosedive
Sugar	Rainer Erler	Helmuth Lohner, Bruce Spence, Colin McEwan	Science fiction	a.k.a. Zucker – Eine wirklich süße Katastrophe
Sukkubus	Georg Tressler	Pamela Prati, Peter Simonischek, Giovanni Früh	Horror	a.k.a. Succubus
Tam Tam oder Wohin die Reise geht	Berengar Pfahl	Judy Winter, Hannelore Elsner, Hannes Jaenicke	Drama	
Tennessee Waltz	Nicolas Gessner	Julian Sands, Stacey Dash, Ned Beatty, Rod Steiger	Thriller	a.k.a. Tennessee Nights a.k.a. Black Water. Swiss-American-West German co-production
Tiger, Lion, Panther	Dominik Graf	Natja Brunckhorst, Martina Gedeck, Sabine Kaack, Peter Lohmeyer	Comedy	
Umwege nach Venedig	Joachim Roering	Heidelinde Weis, Peter Bongartz, Heiner Lauterbach	Comedy	
Ungewiss ist die Zukunft der Leibwächter	Volker Einrauch, Lothar Kurzawa	Martin Lüttge, Peter Lohmeyer	Crime	
Eine unheimliche Karriere	Eberhard Itzenplitz	Helmut Zierl, Hans Peter Hallwachs	Comedy	
Unsichtbare Mauern	Wolfgang Mühlbauer	Hannes Jaenicke, Jacques Breuer	Drama	
Verfolgte Wege	Uwe Janson	Barbara Auer, Peter Cieslinski	Drama	
Ein verhexter Sommer	Klaus Lemke	Günther Maria Halmer, Fabian Harloff, Johnny Logan, Kate O'Toole, J. J. Murphy, Hark Bohm, Christian Doermer, Christiane Carstens	Drama	
Via Appia	Jochen Hick	Peter Senner, Guilherme de Pádua, Yves Jansen	Drama	
Violent Shit	Andreas Schnaas	Andreas Schnaas	Horror	
The Voice	Gustavo Graef Marino	Jon Finch, Ian Dury, Suzanna Hamilton, Uwe Ochsenknecht, Heinz Hoenig, Richy Müller, Claude-Oliver Rudolph	Thriller	
The Voice of the Turtle	Margit Saad	Leslie Malton, Erich Hallhuber	Comedy	a.k.a. Das Lied der Taube
Waller's Last Trip	Christian Wagner	Herbert Knaup	Drama	
Wedding	Heiko Schier	Harald Kempe, Roger Hübner, Angela Schmid-Burgk, Heino Ferch	Drama	
Die weißen Zwerge	Dirk Schäfer	Nirit Sommerfeld, Michael Schech	Drama	
Wie du mir ...	Dagmar Damek	Ernst Jacobi, Michael Degen, Otto Sander	Crime comedy	
With the Next Man Everything Will Be Different	Xaver Schwarzenberger	Antje Schmidt, Dominic Raacke, Volkert Kraeft, Despina Pajanou, Billie Zöckler	Comedy	
Zwiebelmuster	Claudia Holldack	Günter Mack, Antje Hagen	Drama	a.k.a. Zwiebelmuster oder Wenn einer keine Reise tut
