= Charles Lewinsky =

Swiss screenwriter and playwright

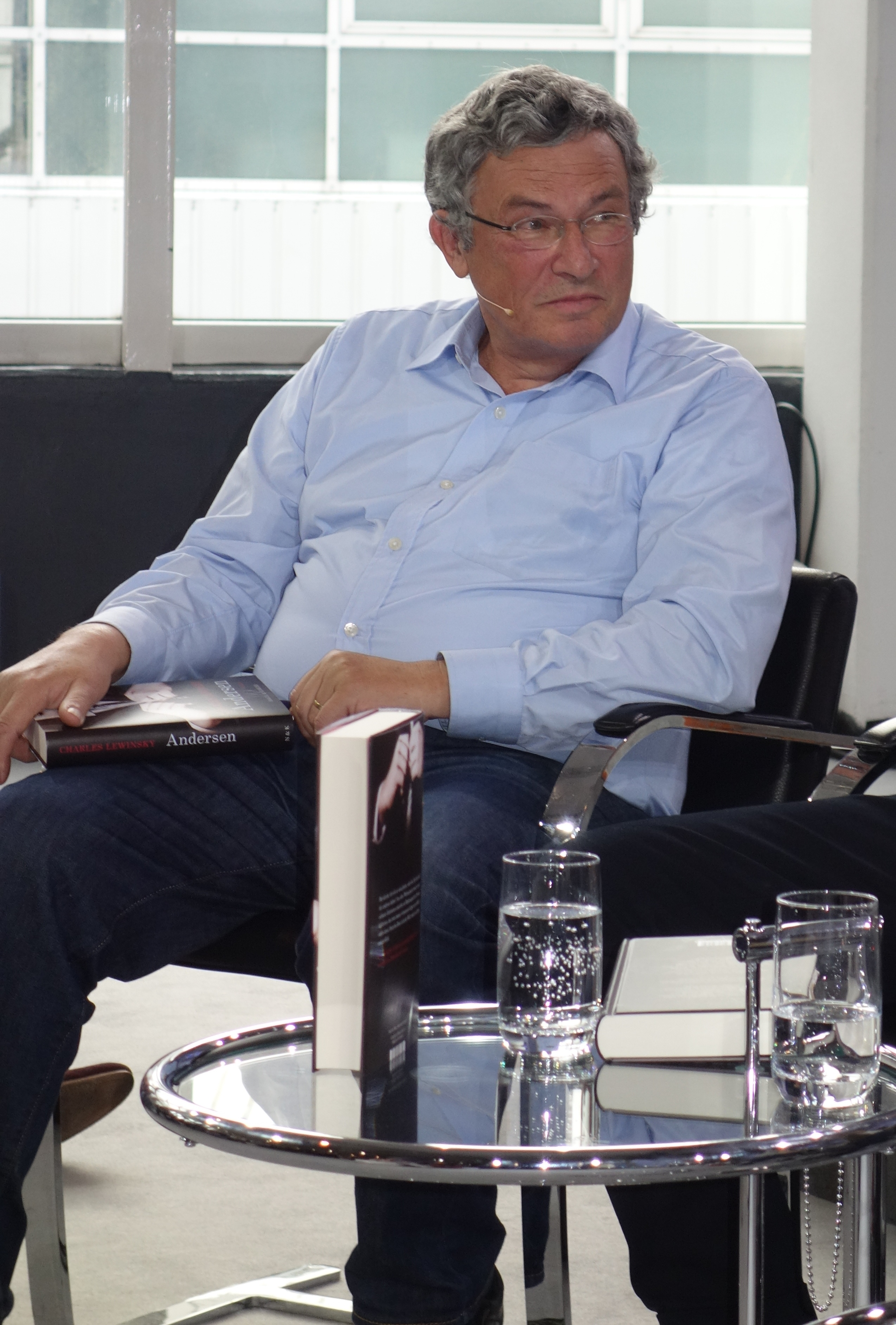
- Lewinsky, Swiss television SRF 1, 6 March 2013
- Born: 14 April 1946 (age 80); Zürich, Switzerland
- Occupations: Television screenwriter, playwright, and writer
- Years active: since 1965
- Notable work: Fascht e Familie
- Spouse: Ruth Lewinsky
- Awards: Charles Lewinsky#Awards
- Website: Official website (in German)

Charles Lewinsky is a Swiss screenwriter and playwright, as well as a writer of novels and non-fiction, born and living in Zürich. He is known for his TV script Fascht e Familie.

== Early life and education ==
Born and raised in Zürich, Canton of Zürich in Switzerland, Charles Lewinsky studied German and theater science in Berlin and Zurich, and worked as an assistant director of Fritz Kortner. In 1965 Charles Lewinsky married Ruth Lewinsky née Halpern, a Swiss writer who also was born in Zürich. In 1965/67 he was assistant director and dramaturg at the Stadttheater Luzern, in 1967/70 dramaturge and personal assistant to the director at the Stadttheater Ingolstadt, in 1970/71 dramaturge at the Freie Volksbühne Berlin, and in 1972/75 dramaturg and director at the Staatstheater Kassel.

== Career ==
=== Dramaturgy and playwright ===
In 1975 Lewinsky became the editor and head of the "word - entertainment" department of the present Swiss national television SRF. Since 1980 he has worked as a freelance writer, especially for television. Lewinsky claims to have written about 1,000 television shows for broadcasters in Austria, Germany and Switzerland, about 30 radioplays and the lyrics for about 500 songs.

For SRF Charles Lewinsky wrote the successful Swiss German language sitcom Fascht e Familie that premiered between 1994 and 1999 on the Swiss national television channel SRF 1, starring among others Trudi Roth, Walter Andreas Müller, Martin Schenkel, Hanna Scheuring, Andreas Matti and Sandra Moser. First aired on 4 November 1994, Fascht e Familie is still very popular in the Swiss German culture, and from time to time re-broadcast in the Swiss German television. In 1997 the RTL-Group in Germany asked for an adoption for the German television, and so the dialogues were synchronized in the Swiss Standard German language, but the Swiss German oriented humour did not fit the audience's gusto in Germany, and even in Austria, and so just 40 episodes have been broadcast between January and October 1997 as Fast ’ne Familie on Super RTL.

For the stage Lewinsky dramatized among others Erich Kästner's Three Men in the Snow that premiered end of September 1983 in his Swiss German adaption, and then toured with the Theater Dreiländereck Basel with Ruedi Walter, Inigo Gallo and Dieter Ballmann, directed by Gallo. Lewinsky wrote cabaret revues (together with Hans Gmür) and further comedies for theater stages in Switzerland and Germany. Moreover, Lewinsky wrote since 1989 more than thirty plays, including "Guillotin" whose stage version premiered under the title "Der gute Doktor Guillotin" at Theater am Neumarkt in Zürich on 15 April 1992. Among others, he also wrote adaptions of plays for the Bernhard-Theater Zürich.

=== Other writing ===
In 1984, Lewinsky and Doris Morf published the political fiction Hitler auf dem Rütli, which was followed by many more books, mostly novels and crime fiction.

Gerron (2011) is a work of historical fiction about Kurt Gerron, a German actor and director who was deported by the Nazi regime to KZ Theresienstadt, where he was forced to produce a propaganda film for the Nazis. Kastelau, Lewinsky's 2014 novel, is the story of the survivors of an exalted Nazi UFA film crew that survives in Bavaria in southern Germany the last months of World War II.

On the 75th anniversary of the library of the Israelitische Cultusgemeinde Zürich (ICZ), the anniversary edition Quelle lebender Bücher (literally: "source of living books") was published, edited by the ICZ-librarians Yvonne Domhardt and Kerstin Paul, in which 75 people present their favorite book from the library. Lewinsky was inspired by a 1938 edition of the Israelisches Wochenblatt newspaper about a variety artists searching his suitcase and tailcoat; the nameless man became the protagonist Felix Grün in Lewinsky's family saga Melnitz.

On 14 April 2016 Lewinsky presented his new novel on his 70th birthday at the Theater Rigiblick in Zürich. Andersen focuses, among others, on the question "what would happen if reincarnation would be associated with the memory of the past life?". How would that the protagonist's – once a bad man - life be affected? About this book, Lewinsky said in an interview: "But I write not a scientific or philosophical book, I tell a story".

== Awards ==
- 2014: Nominated, German Book Prize, for Kastelau
- 2011: Shortlisted, Swiss Book Prize, for Gerron
- 2002: Award by the Swiss magazine Tele for his work as author of sitcoms
- 1995: Prix Walo '94 for his work since 1974
- 1995: Sparten-PRIX WALO for Radio/TV/Filmproduktion (Fascht e Familie)
- 1983: Chaplin Award of the city of Montreux

== Works ==
=== Selected publications ===
- Andersen: Roman. Nagel & Kimche Verlag, München 2016. ISBN 978-3-312-00689-2.
- Kastelau. Nagel & Kimche im Carl Hanser Verlag, München 2014. ISBN 978-3-312-00640-3.
- Falscher Mao, echter Goethe. 48 Glossen über Bücher und Büchermacher. NZZ Libro, Zürich 2012, ISBN 978-3-03823-754-9.
- Gerron. Nagel & Kimche, Zürich 2011, ISBN 978-3-312-00478-2.
- Mattscheibe. Talkshow. Haffmans bei Zweitausendeins, Frankfurt am Main 2008, ISBN 978-3-86150-817-5.
- Einmal Erde und zurück. Der Besuch des alten Kindes. Atlantis, Zürich 2007; dtv, München 2009, ISBN 978-3-423-62401-5.
- Melnitz. Nagel & Kimche, Zürich 2006, ISBN 3-312-00372-5. In English, translated by Shaun Whiteside: Melnitz. Atlantic Books, London 2015, ISBN 978-1-84887-766-5.
- Ein ganz gewöhnlicher Jude. Rotbuch, Hamburg 2005; Rotbuch, Berlin 2007, ISBN 978-3-86789-005-2.
- Johannistag. Haffmans, Zürich 2000; dtv, München 2009, ISBN 978-3-423-13761-4.
- Der A-Quotient. Theorie und Praxis des Lebens mit Arschlöchern. Haffmans, Zürich 1994; Haffmans bei Zweitausendeins, Frankfurt am Main 2011, ISBN 978-3-86150-846-5.

=== Selected plays ===
- 2011: Gotthelf – Das Musical
- 2010: Ein Heimspiel
- 2009: Ein ganz gewöhnlicher Jude
- 2009: Tie Break
- 2006: Heimat, Sweet Heimat
- 2004: Abdankung (with Patrick Frey)
- 2003: Fremdi Fötzel
- 2002: Deep (musical, music by Markus Schönholzer)
- 2002: Welt im Spiegel (texts by Robert Gernhardt)
- 2001: Freunde, das Leben ist lebenswert
- 2000: Ganz e feini Familie
- 1992: Der gute Doktor Guillotin
- 1985: Potztuusig! Zweituusig! Cabaret-Revue with Hans Gmür
- 1984: Drei Männer im Schnee (by Erich Kästner)
- 1983: Plausch in Züri

=== Selected filmography ===
- 2005: Just an Ordinary Jew
- 2005: Das geheime Leben meiner Freundin (Television film)
- 1995–2002: Das Traumschiff (Television series, 5 episodes)
- 2002: Die fabelhaften Schwestern (Television film)
- 2000: Fertig lustig (Television series)
- 1994–1998: Fascht e Familie (Television series, 100 episodes)
- 1992: Verflixte Leidenschaft (Television film)
- 1985: Der Mann am Klavier (Television film)
