= Hunkeler =

Hunkeler is a surname. Notable people with the surname include:

- Edith Hunkeler (born 1972), Swiss former wheelchair racer
- Edward Joseph Hunkeler (1894–1970), American prelate of the Roman Catholic Church
- Ida Glanzmann-Hunkeler (born 1958), Swiss politician and current Vice President of the Christian Democratic People's Party
- Ruth Hunkeler (born 1940), Swiss equestrian
- Tamara Hunkeler, Swiss DJ

== See also ==
- Hunkeler: Das Paar im Kahn, is a Swiss German language television film
- Hunkeler macht Sachen, is a Swiss German language television film
- Hunkeler und die Augen des Ödipus, is a Swiss German language television film
