= The Inventor (1980 film) =

1981 film

- Der Erfinder
- Directed by: Kurt Gloor
- Screenplay by: Kurt Gloor
- Based on: play by Hansjörg Schneider
- Produced by: Kurt Gloor
- Starring: Bruno Ganz
- Cinematography: Franz Rath
- Edited by: Stefanie Wilke
- Music by: Jonas C. Haefeli
- Production company: Kurt Gloor Filmproduktion
- Release date: 1980
- Running time: 99 minutes
- Country: Switzerland
- Language: Swiss German

The Inventor (German: Der Erfinder) is a 1980 Swiss drama film directed and written by Kurt Gloor. Based on a play by Hansjörg Schneider, it stars Bruno Ganz as Jakob Nüssli, a pacifist farmer and inventor during the First World War. The film won the OCIC Award at the San Sebastián International Film Festival and was nominated for the Golden Bear at Berlin and the Gold Hugo at Chicago.

== Synopsis ==
Jakob Nüssli, a pacifist Swiss farmer, avoids military service during the First World War and devotes himself at home to building an off-road vehicle intended to make farm work easier. When he sees in a newsreel that a similar caterpillar-track mechanism is already being used by the military, he withdraws from the world and is eventually institutionalized.

== Cast ==
The cast includes:

- Bruno Ganz as Jakob Nüssli
- Walo Lüönd as Otti
- Verena Peter as Martha Nüssli
- Thomas Ott as Kobi
- Klaus Knuth as Philipp Nüssli
- Babett Arens as Lisbeth Nüssli

== Production ==
Principal photography took place in the Zürcher Oberland from 9 June to 25 July 1980. The film received support from the Volkart Foundation, the Federal Department of Home Affairs and the Kuratorium des Kantons Aargau.

== Reception ==
=== Awards and nominations ===
In 1981, Der Erfinder was nominated for the Golden Bear at the Berlin International Film Festival and the Gold Hugo at the Chicago International Film Festival. It won the OCIC Award at the San Sebastián International Film Festival.

=== Critical response ===
Filmdienst described Der Erfinder as carefully made, writing that it offered both a compelling portrait of its inventor and a critical view of how others react to him as an outsider. Filmo described the film as forceful and unsettling, and wrote that it told a larger story through modest lives. Thomas Hunziker of filmblog.ch described the film as still impressive for its dry humour, attention to detail and performances.
