= Anna Katharina Schwabroh =

German actress (born 1979)

Anna Katharina Schwabroh (born October 21, 1979) is a German actress.

== Life ==
Anna Katharina Schwabroh was born in 1979 in Hamburg. Her love for the theater began with visits to the Thalia Theater Hamburg. When she was 11 years old, she saw Robert Wilson's The Black Rider and later Time Rocker and Alice. These productions impressed Schwabroh deeply and she wanted to know theater. She won insights behind the stage, she completed internships by the Thalia Theater. She felt the urge to act on stage. Her first stage experience she gained before studying acting as lead singer of the band from Hamburg Alto.

From 2002 to 2006, she completed her acting studies at the University of the Arts Bern. She received her diploma. Engagements have taken her to the Schauspielhaus Zurich to the Lucerne Theater and the Theater Fabrik Hamburg.

She appeared in television productions, including the crime scene and Hamburg Dockland. In the Swiss film Cargo Schwabroh played the main role. In summer 2009, she played Clara in the operetta The White Horse Inn on the floating stage Kreuzlingen. In the summer of 2010, she performed at the Berliner Ensemble in the musical The Island Comedy.

Since 2010, she has been a permanent member of the Landestheater Detmold. In the 2011/2012 season she performed as Mae in Cat on a Hot Tin Roof and as Recha in Nathan the Wise. She also played Pauline Piperkarcka in Gerhart Hauptmann's The rats and the title role in the musical Irma la Douce.

== Theater ==
Year	Piece	Role	Director	Theatre
2013	Jedermann (Hugo von Hofmannsthal)	Paramour	Kay Metzger	Landestheater Detmold
2012–2013	Woyzek reloaded (Georg Büchner)	Marie	Swentja Krumscheidt	Landestheater Detmold
2012–2013	Mr Puntila and his Man Matti	The smugglers Emma / The Cow girl	Tatjana Rese	Landestheater Detmold
2012	Dr. Bizarre and the chamber of horrors!	Patience Topless Lady Charlene	Oliver Trautwein	Landestheater Detmold
2012–2013	Irma la Douce	Irma la Douce	Tatjana Rese	Landestheater Detmold
2012–2013	Nathan der Weise (Gotthold Ephraim Lessing)	Recha	Rüdiger Pape	Landestheater Detmold
2012	Die Ratten	Pauline Piperkarcka	Tatjana Rese	Landestheater Detmold
2011–2012	Cat on a Hot Tin Roof (Tennessee Williams)	Mae	Wolfgang Hagemann	Landestheater Detmold
2011–2012	Ladies Night	Glenda	Andreas Kloos	Landestheater Detmold
2011–2012	Lucie sails away (after a puppet of T. dirt road)	Lucy	Valentine Straw	Landestheater Detmold
2010–2011	A man comes to the world (M. Heckmann)	Reporter, Time, son and voice	Tatjana Rese	Landestheater Detmold
2010–2011	The story of the little Muck (W. Hauff)	The Moon, Cat, Sultan and Retailers	Esther Mushol	Landestheater Detmold
2010–2011	Moby Dick (Herman Melville)	Peleg, Elias, Stubb, Captain Gardiner	Stefanie Bertram	Landestheater Detmold
2010–2011	Hey boss, here I am! (W. Hahn)	Lisa Kowalsky	Marco Misgaiski	Landestheater Detmold
2010	Inselkomödie – or Lysistrata and NATO (Rolf Hochhuth, F. Fries)	Tina	Heiko Stang	Berliner Ensemble
2009	Zum weißen Rössl (music: R. Ralph Benatzky)	Clara, Kathi	Jean Grädel	Lake Burgtheater Kreuzlingen
2008	The panic (R. Spregelburd)	Anabel, Roxana and Melina Trelles	Andreas Herrmann	Luzerner Theater
2007	Says Lila (novel by Chimo)	Purple	Henry Meyer	Luzerner Theater
2006	Shopping and Fucking (M. Ravenhill)	Gary	Nils Daniel Finck	Theater Fabrik Hamburg
2006	At the beach the whole wide world (S. Stephens)	Sarah Black	Karin Beier	Schauspielhaus Zurich
2006	Trilogie des Wiedersehens (Botho Strauss)	Petra	Stephan Sabrowski	University of the Arts Bern
2005	Traumspiel (Strindberg)		Andrij Zholdak	Luzerner Theater
2005	Visioni corsare – Tribute to Pier Paolo Pasolini		A carpenter	Luzerner Theater
2005	Bluebeard's shadow (G. Trakl – Edit. T. Potzger)	Pope Joan	F. Schubert, T. Potzger	
2003	Faust (Goethe)		Lars-Ole Walburg	Theater Basel

== Filmography ==
=== cinema ===
- 2005: Helga, short film, directed by Fabian Niklaus
- 2005: Aporue was aroused, short film, directed by Fabian Niklaus
- 2006: Bridges, short film, directed by Fabian Niklaus
- 2009: Cargo, directed by Ivan Engler and Ralph Etter

=== Television ===
- 2004: Oeschenen, Swiss TV film, directed by Bernhard Giger
- 2008: Notruf Hafenkante: Herzenssache, directed by Ulli Baumann
- 2009: Tatort: Tote Männer, directed by Thomas Jauch
