= Her Second Chance =

Her Second Chance may refer to:

- Sonjas Rückkehr, a 2006 Swiss film also known as Her Second Chance
- Her Second Chance (1926 film), a lost 1926 silent film
