= Ettore Cella =

Swiss actor

- Born: 12 September 1913; Zurich, Switzerland
- Died: 1 July 2004 (aged 90); Brütten, Switzerland
- Occupations: Actor, film director
- Years active: 1941–2004

Ettore Cella (12 September 1913 – 1 July 2004) was a Swiss actor and film director. He was naturalised as a Swiss citizen in 1930, as his parents had emigrated from Italy. He appeared in 25 films between 1941 and 2004. He starred in the 1976 film The Sudden Loneliness of Konrad Steiner, which was entered into the 26th Berlin International Film Festival.

== Selected filmography ==
- After the Storm (1948)
- People in the Net (1959)
- Der Teufel hat gut lachen (1960)
- The Sudden Loneliness of Konrad Steiner (1976)
- The Inventor (1981)
- Bill Diamond (1999)
- Lüthi und Blanc (television series, 2000–2001)
- Sternenberg (2004)
