= Gilles Tschudi =

Swiss actor

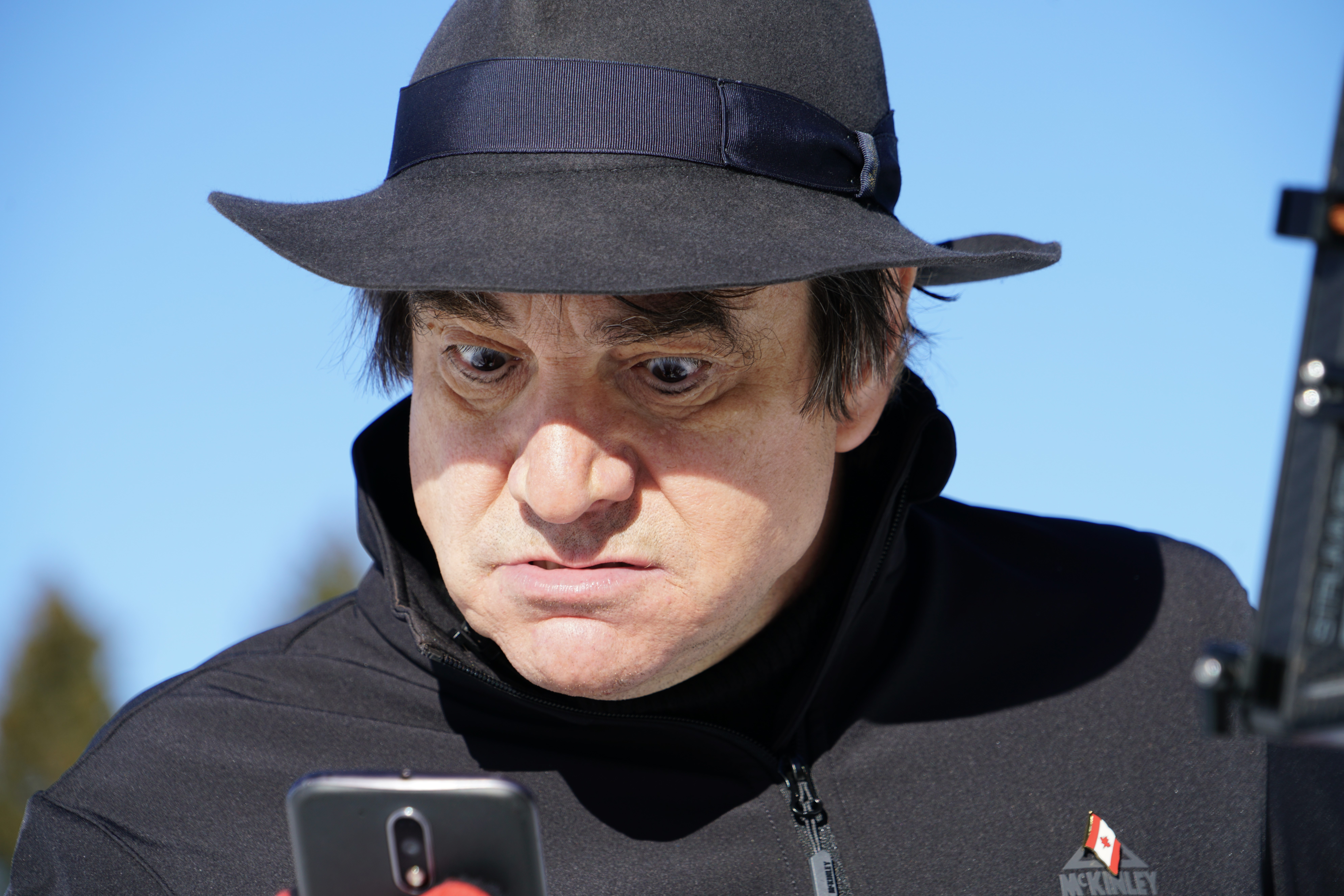
Gilles Tschudi in Swiss-US production PhonY

Gilles Tschudi is a Swiss actor, born in 1957. He is notable for his 2004 Swiss Film Prize for "Performance in a Supporting Role" as "Secretary Goltz" in Jagged Harmonies: Bach vs. Frederick II and for appearing in the films Grounding (2006), Cargo (2009), and Clouds of Sils Maria (2014). For television he appeared in Lüthi und Blanc (1999–2006), Das Paar im Kahn (2004), Hunkeler macht Sachen (2008), and Hunkeler und die Augen des Ödipus (2012)
