= Hunkeler macht Sachen =

- Written by: Dominik Bernet, Hansjörg Schneider
- Directed by: Markus Fischer
- Starring: Mathias Gnädinger
- Music by: Markus Fritzsche
- Country of origin: Switzerland
- Original language: Swiss German

Production
- Producer: Peter Spoerri
- Cinematography: Reinhard Schatzmann
- Editor: Christian Iseli
- Running time: 90 minutes

Original release
- Release: October 2008

Hunkeler macht Sachen is a 2008 Swiss German language television film that was filmed and produced at locations in Switzerland and in France. It is the third film in the hexalogy starring Mathias Gnädinger as Swiss police detective Peter Hunkeler.

== Cast ==
- Mathias Gnädinger as Kommissär Peter Hunkeler
- Charlotte Heinimann as Hedwig
- Oliver Tobias as Thomas Garzoni
- Hanspeter Müller-Drossart as Wirt Edi
- Gilles Tschudi as Kommissär Madörin
- Jürg Löw as Staatsanwalt Suter
- Marc Schmassmann as Assistant Korporal Lüdi
- Emanuela von Frankenberg as Gerichtsmedizinerin Anne de Ville
- Andrea Gloggner as Marlene Mauch
- Peter Jecklin as Hardy Schirmer
- Ueli Jäggi as Wachtmeister Füglistaller
- Diana Rojas-Feile as Angel
- Doris Paladini as Barbara Amsler
- Ramin Yazdani as Binaku sen.

== Plot (excerpt) ==
A prostitute with slashed earlobes is found strangled in a pond. Later, Kommissär Hunkeler (Mathias Gnädinger) finds his sidekick Schirmer also murdered with slashed earlobes, however, he gradually begins to doubt his abilities, and later even he's suspended by his boss Staatsanwalt Suter. Thomas Garzoni, owner of a brothel and Marlene Mauch’s lover, Schirmer’s former girlfriend, is strongly suspected. As he tells to Hunkeler whose help he's asking, Garzoni (Oliver Tobias) is troubled by his past as a member of the Fahrende minority in Switzerland, and even was a ward of the Kinder der Landstrasse organisation in the 1970s. Although the Basel Police's younger colleague Madörin (Gilles Tschudi) is treating the "Schirmer case" as a murder involving drugs, Hunkeler is of another opinion, ...

== Background ==
The hexalogy was produced for Swiss television SF DRS between 2004 (Das Paar im Kahn) and 2012 (Hunkeler und die Augen des Ödipus). This third instalment is based on the 2004 novel Hunkeler macht Sachen by Hansjörg Schneider.

== Production ==
=== Locations ===
The production of the Swiss television SRF was filmed at locations in Basel, in the Canton of Basel-Land and in Alsace in France. The film director also produced Das Paar im Kahn in 2004.

=== Kommissär Hunkeler ===
Hunkeler has unconventional methods, and has a lot of compassion for ordinary people, for society's little guys. These facts, as well as his at times gruff conduct bring him into conflict with colleagues and superiors. On occasion, Basel police want to get rid of him because Hunkeler often does not adhere to the rules. As the film director of the first Hunkeler film loves "fat detectives", Marie-Louise Bless searched for an actor who was "fat, charismatic, and could credibly embody an advocate for the little guy". Mathias Gnädinger was the ideal choice ("Gnädinger is Hunkeler is Gnädinger"), a view also shared by the author of the novel, Hans Jörg Schneider. Mathias Gnädinger, in his early years a stage actor at the Theater Neumarkt at Neumarkt, Zürich, died on 3 April 2015, hence the Hunkeler serial comprises six films in all.

=== Kinder der Landstrasse ===
The film refers to the Swiss Kinder der Landstrasse relief organization and the fate of those juvenile Fahrende victims.

So in a short scene, the keeper of the archives handles over to Hunkeler among other documents a film, Kinder der Landstrasse, in which Mathias Gnädinger starred in 1993 as actor.

== Reception ==
Hunkeler macht Sachen premiered at 14e Cinéma tout écran at Geneva in Switzerland in October 2008 and at the 44th Solothurn Film Festival in January 2009. The film was repeatedly broadcast in the Swiss television, for the last time on 17 May 2015 on SRF 1. Hunkeler macht Sachen is available on DVD in a Swiss German language version with German subtitles.

== Festivals ==
- 2008: 14e Cinéma tout écran - Festival international du film et de la télévision at Geneva.
- 2009: Solothurn Film Festival.
