= Hide and Seek (2018 film) =

2018 Swiss film directed by Christoph Schaub

- Film poster
- Romansh: Amur senza fin
- Directed by: Christoph Schaub
- Written by: Sabine Pochhammer
- Produced by: Reto Schaerli; Lukas Hobi
- Starring: Rebecca Indermaur; Bruno Cathomas; Tonia Maria Zindel; Murali Perumal
- Cinematography: Pierre Mennel
- Edited by: Gion-Reto Killias
- Music by: Balz Bachmann
- Distributed by: Cinema Management Group
- Release date: 23 September 2018
- Country: Switzerland
- Language: Romansh

Hide and Seek (Romansh: Amur senza fin, lit. 'Endless love') is a Swiss romantic comedy-drama film directed by Christoph Schaub. It is the first-ever Romansh language television film and made its debut at the Locarno Festival. The film was also screened at the Toronto International Film Festival before airing on Swiss national television in September 2018. Cinema Management Group purchased the international distribution rights for the film.

== Plot ==
In a small village in Grisons, Mona and Gieri, a middle-aged couple who have been married for twenty years, are having difficulty with their romantic relationship. They befriend Father Nanda Sharma, their village's new Catholic priest, and ask for his advice to help spice up their relationship. His unconventional ways stir up trouble in the village. Upon discovering that Gieri has had an extramarital affair, Mona leaves him. She opens a café and starts dating another man. Gieri, encouraged by their two children, tries to win her back.

== Cast ==
- Rebecca Indermaur as Mona
- Bruno Cathomas as Gieri
- Tonia Maria Zindel as Giulia
- Beat Marti as Urs
- Marietta Jemmi as Carla
- Murali Perumal as Father Nanda Sharma
- René Schnoz as Silvio
- Anita Iselin as Ladina
- Martin Rapold as Michael
- Muriel Degonda as Peppina
- Bono Jacomet as Leo
- Peter Jecklin as Vicar General Huber
- Roman Weishaupt as Hunter

== Production and release ==
Amur senza fin was directed by Christoph Schaub and co-produced by the Swiss Broadcasting Corporation's Zodiac Pictures LTD and premiered at the Festival del film Locarno in August 2018. In September 2018 it was screened at the Toronto International Film Festival. On 2 September 2018 Amur senza fin was shown at more than 20 cinemas throughout Switzerland for Cinema Day. The television premiere was broadcast on 23 September 2018 on SRF 1. It is the first Romansh language television film produced.

Cinema Management Group, a Los Angeles–based film company, bought the international distribution rights for Amur senza fin.
