= Heidi (2015 film) =

- Theatrical release poster
- Directed by: Alain Gsponer
- Screenplay by: Petra Biondina Volpe
- Based on: Heidi (1881) by Johanna Spyri
- Produced by: Jakob Claussen; Lukas Hobi; Ulrike Putz; Reto Schärli
- Starring: Bruno Ganz; Anuk Steffen; Katharina Schüttler; Quirin Agrippi; Isabelle Ottmann; Anna Schinz; Rebecca Indermaur
- Cinematography: Matthias Fleischer
- Edited by: Mike Schaerer
- Music by: Niki Reiser
- Production company: Claussen + Wöbke Putz + Filmproduktion
- Distributed by: Buena Vista International (Switzerland); StudioCanal (Germany)
- Release date: 10 December 2015
- Running time: 111 minutes
- Countries: Switzerland; Germany
- Language: German

Heidi is a 2015 Swiss-German family adventure film directed by Alain Gsponer from a screenplay written by Petra Biondina Volpe, based on the 1881 novel of the same name by Johanna Spyri. It stars Anuk Steffen in the title role, alongside Bruno Ganz, Katharina Schüttler, Quirin Agrippi, Isabelle Ottmann and Anna Schinz.

== Plot synopsis ==
After living for several years with her Aunt Dete, young orphan Heidi is brought to live in the Swiss Alps with her elderly grandfather, Alpöhi. Despite being known as a fearsome recluse, he soon grows to love Heidi. She quickly befriends the goatherd, Peter, a boy slightly older than her. For the next few years, Heidi grows up happily with her grandfather, although she wishes to attend school in the village with the other local children.

One day, Aunt Dete unexpectedly returns and tricks Heidi into running away with her to Frankfurt (practically kidnapping her) to become a companion to a young girl from an upper-class family. The girl, Klara, is unable to walk and uses a wheelchair; it is implied that she lost use of her legs after the death of her mother. Although her father loves her, he is often away on business and Klara is left with her strict governess, Fräulein Rottenmeier. Heidi struggles to read and fit into polite society, but she forms a close bond with Klara.

Klara's father returns and surprises Klara with a visit from her grandmother, who treats Heidi kindly and encourages her to learn how to read. Despite Heidi showing academic improvement, Klara's grandmother notices that the girl is unhappy in Frankfurt and informs her son. Klara's father initially ignores this as his daughter has been happy since Heidi's arrival. Soon, Heidi's homesickness manifests in sleepwalking around the house at night, scaring the house staff who had mistaken her for being a ghost. On the doctor's recommendation, Klara's father returns Heidi to her grandfather, upsetting Klara who feels that her only friend is abandoning her.

Heidi and Alpöhi joyfully reunite in the Alps. The two quickly settle back into life with each other and Alpöhi allows Heidi to attend school, purchasing a winter residence within the village. Meanwhile, Heidi frequently writes to Klara, who regrets her angry reaction to Heidi leaving. Soon, Klara's grandmother allows her to visit Heidi in the mountains. The two friends happily reunite, inciting the jealousy of Peter who pushes Klara's wheelchair off a cliff. He is scolded by Alpöhi and is immediately remorseful of his actions. While playing with Heidi and Peter on the mountains, Klara slowly regains the use of her legs. When her father and grandmother appear to take her home, Klara reveals her ability to walk again. Her father weeps with joy and is grateful to Heidi and Alpöhi for taking good care of his daughter.

Before Klara's grandmother leaves, she gifts Heidi with a notebook to encourage her dream of becoming a writer. Both families remain good friends and maintain contact with each other.

== Cast ==
- Anuk Steffen as Heidi
- Bruno Ganz as Grandfather
- Quirin Agrippi as Peter, Heidi's goatherd mountain friend
- Isabelle Ottmann as Klara Sesemann, Heidi's upper class town friend
- Katharina Schüttler as Fräulein Rottenmeier, Klara's governess
- Hannelore Hoger as Grandmother Sesemann
- Maxim Mehmet as Herr Sesemann, Klara's father
- Anna Schinz as Dete, Heidi's aunt
- Peter Lohmeyer as Sebastian, the kind butler at Klara's house
- Jella Haase as Tinette, a maid at Klara's house
- Rebecca Indermaur as Geissenpeterin
- Peter Jecklin as the village priest
- Monica Gubser as Peter's grandmother
- Markus Hering as the doctor

== Production ==
The 10-year-old Steffen was chosen from among 500 young actresses. The film was shot on location in the Alps, mainly in the region of Grisons, including Bergün and Rheinwald. The mountains visuals were filmed in Pendes and Mogrovejo in Cantabria, Spain.

== Release ==
The film debuted theatrically in Germany on 10 December 2015.

== Reception ==
On review aggregator Rotten Tomatoes, the film holds an approval rating of 100% based on 7 reviews, with an average rating of 7.5/10.
