= Toutes peines confondues =

1992 French crime drama film

- French Film poster showing Patrick Bruel and Jacques Dutronc
- Directed by: Michel Deville
- Written by: Andrew Coburn; Rosalinde Deville
- Produced by: Rosalinde Deville
- Starring: Patrick Bruel; Jacques Dutronc; Mathilda May
- Cinematography: Bernard Lutic
- Edited by: Raymonde Guyot
- Distributed by: AMLF
- Release date: 8 April 1992
- Running time: 107 minutes
- Country: France
- Language: French
- Box office: $6.7 million

Toutes peines confondues is a 1992 French crime drama film starring Mathilda May. It was filmed and produced at locations in France and Switzerland, and bases on the 1985 novel Sweetheart by Andrew Coburn.

== Plot ==
The French detective superintendent Christophe Vade (Patrick Bruel) investigates the murder of an elderly French couple in the French Alps. In the course of his investigation, he encounters Jeanne Gardella (Mathilda May), the wife of the businessman Antoine Gardella (Jacques Dutronc), a member of an organized crime family, and the son of the murdered couple. Antoine Gardella and his wife Jeanne live harmoniously, but Jeanne Gardella was forced by Thurson (Vernon Dobtcheff), a dubious agent of Interpol, to take her "role as wife" in the context of an undercover action against the European organized crime. Despite his criminal background, Jeanne loves her husband. Thurson also urges Christophe Vade to investigate Gardella and his wife in connection with the murder of those parents, and to get an additional pressure medium to gouge Jeanne Gardella to continue that farce. Thurson does not explain that plan either to inspector Vade or Jeanne Gardella, who he falls in love with, finally tolerated by Antoine Gardella who accepts that his wife was forced to that undercover action by Thurson. Tightly interwoven with the main story, the subplot plays in the milieu of the Swiss city of Zürich, and the advances of the brutal and corrupt city police officer Scatamacchia (Hans Heinz Moser) against a hostess allow a very personal view on Scandurat (Bruce Myers), Gardella's business partner and close friend. Finally, Gardella is forced to kill Vade and Jeanne, but refuses and choices suicide, to meet the unwritten rules within the organized crime.

== Cast ==
- Patrick Bruel as Christophe Vade
- Jacques Dutronc as Antoine Gardella
- Mathilda May as Jeanne Gardella
- Sophie Broustal as Laura
- Vernon Dobtcheff as Thurston
- Bruce Myers as Scandurat
- Joël Barbouth as Husquin
- Christophe Brault as Blodgett
- Eric Da Silva as Roselli
- Jean Dautremay as Deckler
- Jocelyn-Clair Durvel as Blue
- Hans Heinz Moser as Scatamacchia
- Michael Pas as Nordixen
- Bernard Waver as Roger Silas
- Jürgen Zwingel as Kimbler
- Joseph Malerba as Inspector Nolo

== Background and production ==
The film bases on the 1985 novel Sweetheart by Andrew Coburn. Toutes peines confondues premiered on 8 April 1992 in France, in Belgium on 4 June 1992, in Germany on 27 August 1992 and in Sweden on 30 July 1993. The film was shot and produced at locations in the French Alps, and partially in Lyon and in Zürich. For international use, Toutes peines confondues was also titled Sweetheart.
