= Trudi Roth =

Swiss stage and film actress

- Roth as Tante Martha in Fascht e Familie (late 1990s)
- Born: 2 April 1930; Basel, Switzerland
- Died: 11 June 2016 (aged 86); Zürich, Switzerland
- Occupations: Stage and film actress
- Years active: 1947–2016
- Notable work: Fascht e Familie (1994–1999)

Trudi Roth (2 April 1930 – 11 June 2016) was a Swiss stage and film actress who starred in Swiss German language cinema and television and stage productions.

== Biography ==
Born in Basel, Switzerland, Roth lived in the municipality of Zürich. Her first stage experiences date back to her childhood as she had a small role at the Stadttheater Basel in 1939. She attended the Konservatorium under Ernst Ginsberg in Basel, followed by performances beginning in 1947 with the cabaret-doodle-doo, KiKeriKi with César Keiser and Cabaret Cornichon respectively Cabaret Fédéral. Later she starred in comedies and musicals, and Trudi Roth acted for the radio in radio plays and for the Swiss television.

Roth's most popular role was the character of Martha Aebersold in the Swiss comedy serial Fascht e Familie in the 1990s. Among others, Trudi Roth also starred in about a dozen plays, musicals and farces on Bernhard-Theater Zürich between 1965 and 2001. Trudi Roth motivated film director Marie-Louise Bless to create the television film Das Paar im Kahn in 2004.

Charles Lewinsky, creator of Fascht e Familie, recalls that she played every summer the Chaschperli in Zürich, followed by appearances in films, television series and in the Bernhard Theater. At the age of 80, she still played a role in his play 'Huusfründe'. He remembers the long conversations with Trudi Roth: It was impossible, to talk briefly with Trudi. When I told my wife, now I call on Trudi she said: 'I'll see you in an hour'. Trudi Roth was Charles Lewinsky sympathetic at the first co-operation, above all to have the gift of the gab.

== Personal life ==
From 1953 to 1957 she lived in Düsseldorf while working for the German Kom(m)ödchen ensemble; Roth then returned to Basel. With her partner Hans Moeckel, conductor of the Swiss Federal entertainment orchestra, she moved to Zürich in the 1970s. Although in a relationship, she remained single and childless.

== Death ==
In the last years of her life, the actress sometimes did not recognize her brother Alfred, and forgot her former success as an artist. We were very close, "like twins," he said in an interview: She had a quirky sense of humor, was never jealous, spoke directly and lived modestly." As Trudi Roth's family announced to the Swiss television SRF, the actress and cabaret artist died on the night of 11 June 2016 in a nursing home in Zürich. Cause of death was her age of 86, and dementia.

== Awards ==
- 1995: Prix Walo

== Filmography (selected works) ==
- 1953: Metamorphose
- 1962: Der 42. Himmel
- 1980: Theo Against the Rest of the World
- 1994–1997: Fascht e Familie (100 episodes)
- 2004: Flamingo (TV series)
