= Das Paar im Kahn =

- Swiss DVD cover
- Written by: Peter Purtschert
- Directed by: Marie-Louise Bless
- Starring: Mathias Gnädinger
- Music by: Marcel Vaid
- Country of origin: Switzerland
- Original language: Swiss German

Production
- Producer: Markus Fischer
- Cinematography: Hansueli Schenkel
- Editor: Christian Iseli
- Running time: 76 minutes

Original release
- Release: October 2004

Das Paar im Kahn is a 2004 Swiss German language television film that was filmed and produced at locations in Basel respectively in Switzerland and in France. It is the first film of the six-episode serial starring Mathias Gnädinger as inspector Hunkeler.

== Cast ==
- Mathias Gnädinger as inspector Peter Hunkeler
- Gilles Tschudi as inspector Madörin
- Marc Schmassmann as corporal Lüdi
- Jürg Löw as state attorney Suter
- Sophie Scholz as Zarah
- Andrea Bettini as Pedro
- Emanuela von Frankenberg as forensic pathologist Anne de Ville
- Baris Eren as Ali Aydin
- Urs Bihler as Dr. Beat Spälti
- Caroline Rasser as juvenile attorney
- Tom Ryser as Theo Ruf
- Pasquale Voggenhuber as Fredi Woodtli
- Lale Yavaş as Aische Aydin (Türkan Yavas)
- Pia Weibel as Frau Lüthi
- Birol Tarkan Yildiz as consul Türkoglou
- Birol Yildiz as turkish man #1
- Mustafa Sahingöz as turkish man #2
- Mäni Weber as Hansjörg

== Plot summary ==
The young Roma Zarah burgles an apartment in Basel, witnesses a murder, and escapes undetected but loses an amulet. In the meantime, Peter Hunkeler (Mathias Gnädinger), Kommissär (inspector) of the Basel Police, reflects on his impending retirement – in fact his boss, (prosecuting attorney) Staatsanwalt Suter, has already written him off and sends Hunkeler to Alsace to research a study about youth crime, but he prefers to spend his time at the local spa.

When Hunkeler returns to Basel, a colleague tells him about the murder case that his partner is investigating: Aische Aydin, a young woman of Turkish origin, is found slain in her apartment in Basel where she lived the past five years. Her husband Ali Aydin (Baris Eren) is suspected, but he keeps silent, and Hunkeler's ambitious young colleague Madörin (Giles Tschudi) leads the investigations and arrests the victim’s husband. Later, Aydin even attempts suicide when alleged staff of the Turkish consulate tried to get further information.

Hunkeler is assailed by doubts, and finds an amulet in the apartment – representing a couple in a boat – that attracts his attention. Hunkeler meets a colleague in a bar that recommends him to ask a narc of the drug police in Basel, and Fredy later 'assists' Hunkeler to complete his investigations. Hunkeler is looking for further hints, surveys Theo Ruf who gave a job as charwoman to Aische, and a neighbor of the Aydin's tells Hunkeler that she observed a Roma girl escaping the house. Hunkeler investigates the strange amulet in the neighbouring Alsace in France in private, as he assumes that Madörin is wrong, where Hunkeler meets Roma families to find the girl.

Shortly afterwards, the heroin addict Theo is found murdered, Hunkeler is sandbagged by the murder, but the police assumes a drug delict as there is a greater amount of heroin. Acquaintances of Aydin confirm that the amulet belonged to Aische, but the forensic scientist Anne de Ville (Emanuela von Frankenberg) remarks that there's no forensic hint that Aische was wearing an amulet, but she was beaten, and Theo even was tortured by his murderer. Aydin remains hospitalized, but now is also associated by the police with drug trafficking: Madörin investigates the drug case and homicide, and Hunkeler now officially investigates the murder of Aische. Advised by his lawyer Spälti who also assisted Aische to bring their children to Switzerland, Ali still keeps silent. Attorney Spälti introduces Hunkeler the Turkish diaspora in Kleinbasel, and informs Hunkeler about the Basel drug scene, doubting that the police will try to solve the homicide, but rather will concentrate their effort to solve the 'drug' case. Theo's alleged killers continue to search for the missing material. Hunkeler contacts again the narc Fredy to get further information, and once again, travels to Alsace to find the supposed witness, the Roma girl.

Hunkeler finds the girl as she breaks a car at a train station in Alsace: Zarah (Sophie Scholz) lost the amulet and confirms that she observed the murder from a hiding place. Hunkeler brings Zarah for a comparison to Basel, wins her to do so by entertaining Zarah to dinner, and they spend a day in his favourite spa. But first the young Roma woman has to be surveyed by the youth advocate, and Hunkeler's boss is cheesed with him because he kidnapped Zarah from France to Switzerland. The youth advocate interrogates Zarah as a witness, but claims involuntary commitment to the underage Roma girl as she committed other crime delicts in Basel. Hunkeler's friend was attacked by two alleged employees of the Turkish consulate, but in fact members of the drug mafia, who later even menace Hunkeler who guests his friend and Zarah. The next day, the two Turkish gangsters have been arrested, but on occasion of the identification parade, Zarah identifies Ali's lawyer, attorney Spälti, and tells what she saw that evening when Aische was killed.

Now, Ali is talking about: He had been forced by the mobsters to courier services, but his wife had hidden the goods. Fearing reprisals, he had been reluctant to satisfy the desire of his wife Aische, and to bring their children to Switzerland. Spälti admits to have slain Aische in the dispute. She had sought his advice, because she necessarily wanted to have their children in Switzerland. Aische liked Spälti, but he wanted more from her then friendship. After Spälti had learned a lot about the background, he tried to blackmail Aische. As she still rejected him, he went berserk and thereby became the killer. Hunkeler sends Zarah back to France to prevent that she is arrested for the minor delicts in Basel. At the end, Hunkeler meets again Anne de Ville.

== Title ==
The title of the film derives from the German term meaning Hunkeler and the couple in the boat, and refers to the amulet that Hunkeler found.

== Background ==
The television film is the first episode of six films about Kommissär Hunkeler starring Mathias Gnädinger, which were produced for the Swiss television SF DRS between 2004 and 2012 (Hunkeler und die Augen des Ödipus). The Swiss German language movie bases on the 1999 novel Das Paar im Kahn by Hansjörg Schneider, and was filmed at location in Basel and in Alsace in France. Marie-Louise Bless, director of Das Paar im Kahn, told in an interview that she was contacted by Trudi Roth (Fascht e Familie) in 2000, and urged to read the novel to realize a film adaptation. Bless sent the book to Peter Butschert to write the script.

== Production ==
=== Locations ===
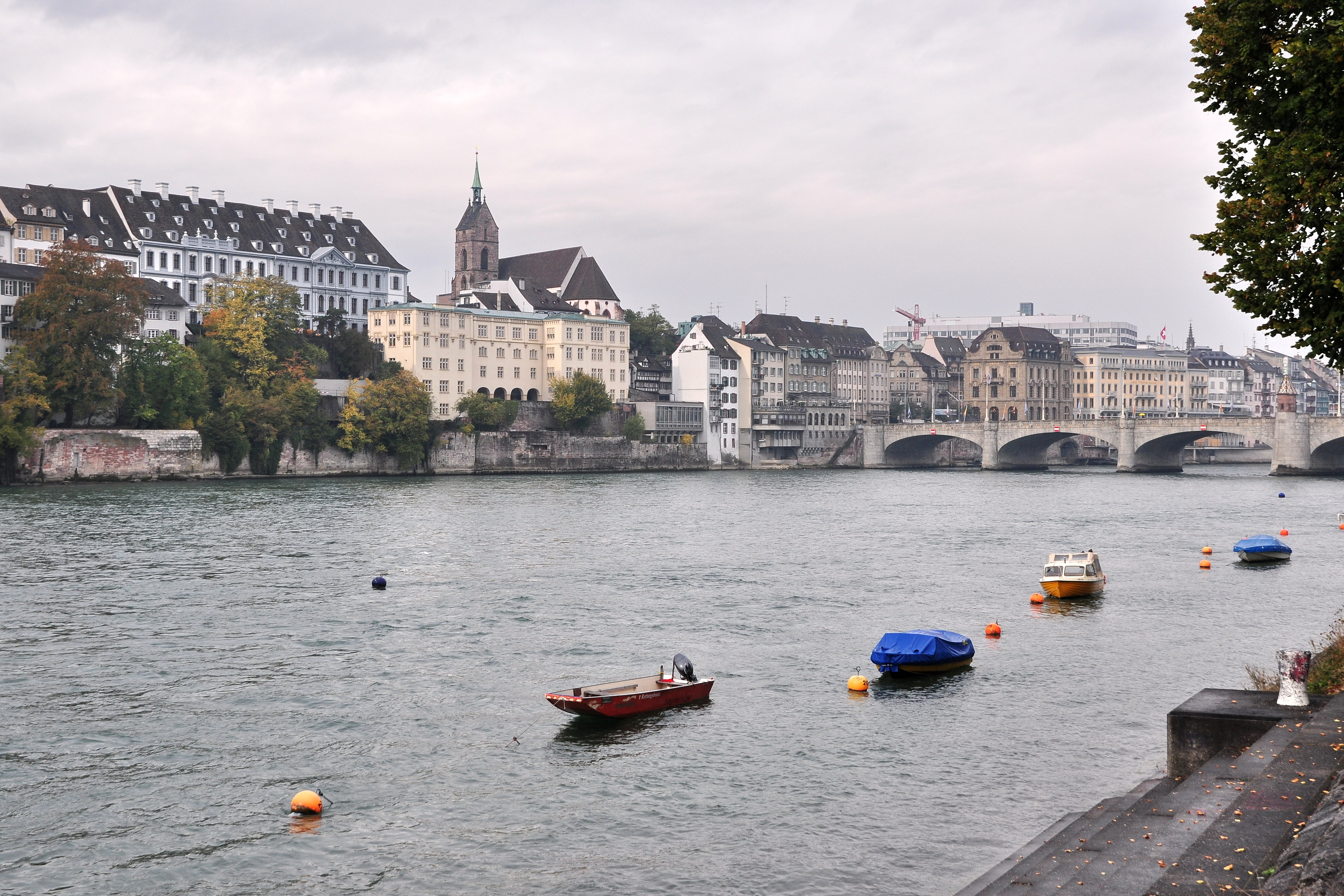
Rhine in Basel

The representation of Basel in the novel, the production team tried to realize as authentic as possible. The postcard Basel would not fit the novel; the film is focussing the unspectacular, easy Basel, the city of the small people and the foreigners which are living there, as well as the river Rhein with its ferries and the Trämli. The production team put the city in a atmospheric, wintery light set. The team was very generously supported by the Basel prosecutor's office and the youth advocate, unfortunately, the police did not provide staff and uniforms for filming.

=== Implementation of the film adaptation ===
Although the novel's writer Hans Jörg Schneider and his publisher were contacted, there was initially no option granted on the film rights, so that the project have been proposed to SR DRS to be realized as a television movie. The co-operation with a first author failed, and Peter Purtschert was involved as an author. Schneider has read some first versions of the script, and was disappointed, because he missed the figure of Hunkeler's girlfriend Hedwig; but the present script he really liked, despite a reduction in the number of minor characters and the laying of internal processes, such as thinking and pondering outward, which were required for the screenplay, to tell the story more stringent as shown in the novel. The focus, however, was the presentation of the fairest possible implementation of Hunkeler's figure and the city of Basel. A movie has its own laws, and economy, hence the part of the detective story had to be told linear. But Putschert expanded the figure of the Roma girl Zarah from Alsace - in the novel a side story, but now directly woven into the homicide case, and so she witnesses the murder.

== Kommissär Hunkeler ==
To determine Hunkeler's unconventional way, his compassion for the little people, his conflicts with colleagues, make him a geek. The Basel police wants to get rid of him because Hunkeler often does not adhere to the rules. As the film director loves thick commissioners, she looked for an actor that was thick, credibly embody the representative of the little people and having charisma. Mathias Gnädinger was the ideal choice, even for Hans Jörg Schneider: Gnädinger is Hunkeler is Gnädinger. Mathias Gnädinger, in his early years a stage actor at the Theater Neumarkt at Neumarkt, Zürich, died on 3 April 2015, hence the Hunkeler serial comprises six films in all.

== Reception ==
Das Paar im Kahn premiered at 10e Cinéma tout écran at Geneva in Switzerland in October 2004 and at the 40th Solothurn Film Festival in January 2005. The film was repeatedly broadcast in the Swiss television, for the last time on 2 May 2015 on SRF 1.

tvspielfilm claims, Swiss adaptation of Maigret.

== Festivals ==
- 2004: 10e Cinéma tout écran - Festival international du film et de la télévision at Geneva.
- 2005: Solothurn Film Festival.
