= Sennentuntschi =

- Theatrical release poster
- Directed by: Michael Steiner
- Screenplay by: Michael Steiner; Michael Sauter; Stefanie Japp
- Based on: Sukkubus (1989 film)
- Produced by: Simone Häberling; Bruno Seemann
- Starring: Roxane Mesquida; Andrea Zogg; Carlos Leal
- Cinematography: Pascal Walder
- Edited by: Ueli Christen
- Production company: Constantin Film Schweiz
- Distributed by: Walt Disney Studios Motion Pictures, Switzerland (Note: Distributed under the Buena Vista International banner.)
- Release date: September 23, 2010 (Zurich)
- Countries: Switzerland, Austria
- Language: Swiss German

Sennentuntschi is a 2010 Swiss film written and directed by Michael Steiner. It is based on an eponymous Alpine fable. The film premiered at the 2010 Zurich Film Festival.

== Plot ==
The film begins with a mother and young daughter mushroom-hunting in the forest of the Swiss Alps. While searching for more mushrooms, the girl finds a mysterious boy shining a light, directing her to a cluster of mushrooms. As she collects the mushrooms, she discovers a human skeleton in the cluster and screams in horror. The police arrive at the location to investigate the skeleton, which the autopsy confirms that a man died on the spot about thirty years ago. To identify the youth she encountered, the police officer present the girl photos of boys who were reported missing, which she points to the image of the boy she witnessed identified as Albert Parpan, who was reported missing in 1975. The police officer believed that the girl has seen a ghost, as the youth was reported missing about thirty years ago. The girl's mother tells the officer a story of another police officer who didn't believe in ghosts.

The story flashes back to 1975 in Grison Alps, Switzerland. A young priest is found hanged in a church tower. The coroner and local police sheriff Sebastian Reusch deduced the priest's death to be suicide by hanging. Shortly after the priest's funeral, a mysterious girl appears in the village. As the villagers shared rumors about the girl, they began to suspect that the girl was responsible for the death of the priest, and became wary and hostile towards her, especially the local bishop, who believed that she is a devil as she's shown to have a profound aversion to a cross. The bishop was escorted from the police station by Reusch, who protected the girl as he suspects that she wasn't raised in a civilized environment. The girl, despite being mute and somewhat feral, is shown to be flirtatious towards Reusch despite his self-control. Intrigued by the girl's behavior, Reusch wants to find out the truth about her.

In a flashback, lonely Alpine herdsmen Erwin and his mute, orphaned nephew Albert are joined by a third man, Martin Delacroix, whose girlfriend broke up with him and claims that he needed to escape the stresses of city life. During a long night while being drunk and high on absinthe, Albert makes a doll out of a broom, rags, and hay, while Erwin tells Martin the story about Sennentuntschi. In the story, three lonely and mating-hungry herdsmen made such a doll, while the devil takes pity upon them and makes it come to life. On the next day, an actual girl appears in their lodge dressed in the doll's clothes. Erwin warns Martin about the ending of the story, in which Sennentuntschi kills all three men, but they both rape her anyway. The girl takes revenge by slaughtering all of Erwin's sheep and goats, and killing Erwin by stabbing him. Albert dies in a fire in the absinthe storehouse by accident when Erwin tried to burn the girl in revenge for the slaughtering of his sheep and goats. Eventually, Martin dies due to blood poisoning from tetanus, as he was bitten by the girl during rape. It is revealed that Martin had murdered his ex-girlfriend and lied to Erwin and Albert in order to lay low for some time and avoid the manhunt. Before his death, Martin confessed to Erwin about murdering his ex-girlfriend, and refused to be taken to the village to seek medical care for his infection in fear of getting arrested.

Back to the village, while Reusch conducts an investigation on the girl's origin, the bishop instigates villagers against her. He tells everyone that the girl is an incarnation of the devil, who has returned for destruction, and was responsible for the recent death of the village mayor's unborn child. He supports his theory by a photograph from 1950, showing a young Gypsy woman that resembles the girl, who disappeared 25 years prior and was suspected of arson and the death of three herdsmen in the same year the photograph was taken. Reusch is the only one who keeps reason, therefore clashing with the villagers. He attempts to take the girl away, but is ambushed by the villagers.

The girl however escapes. Reusch keeps investigating and finds out that the Gypsy woman from the photograph is the girl's mother, who was raped and impregnated by the bishop 25 years prior. The girl's mother then went into hiding in the mountain house of the legendary three herdsmen, but then was found by the bishop, who forced the Gypsy woman off a cliff. To cover his crimes, the bishop murdered the herdsmen by burning their cabin with them inside, and kept their daughter in captivity in an underground chamber since birth. The reason behind her muteness, feral nature, and fear of the sight of a cross is due to 25 years of captivity and isolation with only the late priest assigned by the bishop to care for her, and threatened with a holy cross whenever he took her food. It is revealed that the priest did not commit suicide but was killed by being pushed down the stairs during the girl's escape from the bishop's house. The bishop covered up the priest's death as a suicide, while the girl succeeded in escaping the bishop's house, and ended up at Erwin and Albert's lodge. Reusch arrests and imprisons the bishop and goes into the mountains, searching for the girl.

Reusch finds the girl alive and well in the cabin, however days after the deadly events. The girl made dolls out of Albert, Erwin, and Martin's skins and bodies just like in the legend of Sennentuntschi, since she had no concept of death and believes that if she made the men into dolls as in the legend, they would be brought to life. This made Reusch sick and angry with her. She runs away with Reusch following her, only to pursue her so far that she falls in a ravine due to the heavy fog. He goes after her and finds her lifeless body. Feeling responsible and consumed with guilt for her death, he takes his own life by gunshot.

The story transitions back to the present, the police investigators find the skeletal remains of the girl.

The girl was indeed human and there was no demon. The girl was the subject of false rumors spread by the bishop to scare the villagers, and because of the false rumors, the girl lost her life. The bishop spread those rumors to prevent anyone from discovering that the girl is the daughter of the Gypsy woman he raped.

== Cast ==
- Roxane Mesquida as Sennentuntschi
- Andrea Zogg as Erwin
- Carlos Leal as Martin
- Joel Basman as Albert
- Nicholas Ofczarek as Sebastian Reusch
- Hanspeter Müller-Drossaart as Notter
- Ueli Jäggi as Pfarrer Salis
- Peter Jecklin as Dr. Zingg
- Daniel Rohr as Bauer Stähli
- Rebecca Indermaur as Theres

== Release ==
=== Home media ===
Sennentuntschi was released on DVD and Blu-ray by Invincible Pictures on November 19, 2013.

== Reception ==
Peter Martin of Screen Anarchy stated that, while the film's narrative was occasionally incoherent, Mesquida's performance and cinematography made up for it. Adrian Halen from HorrorNews.net Halen praised the film's writing, and third act, writing, "Sennentuntschi is rooted in a horror/mystery genre premise that actually takes a direction different from many films of it's [sic] genre". Brad McHargue of Bloody Disgusting gave the film a mostly positive review, commending the performances (particularly Mesquida's), cinematography, soundtrack, and mounting tension, while criticizing the disjointed nature, and confusing ending.
