= Pascal Najadi =

Investment banker (born 1967)

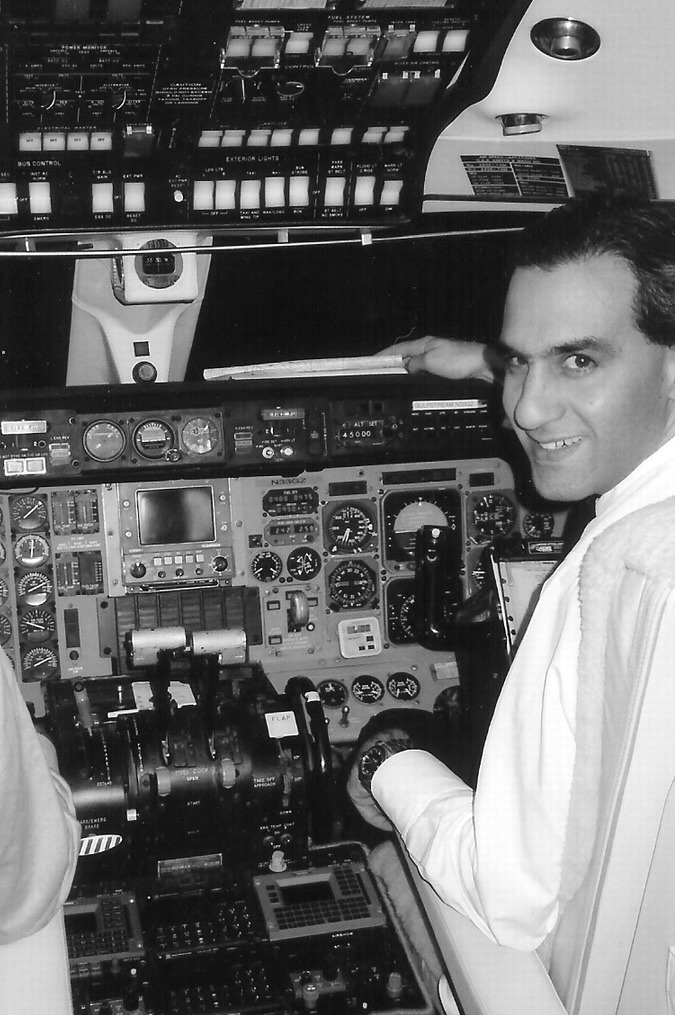
- Born: August 20, 1967 (age 59); Lucerne, Switzerland
- Occupations: Investment banker; investor; philanthropist; producer; writer

Pascal Najadi (born August 20, 1967) is a retired Swiss investment banker, film maker, author and conspiracy theorist. He is the son of Hussain Najadi. He currently works as a bitcoin activist. He is best known for producing movies like Grounding – The Last Days of Swissair (in 2006). He also produced Rebel News (2015), and National Citizens Inquiry (NCI) (2023).

He sued Swiss president Alain Berset for allegedly abusing his office and making false statements on Swiss television regarding COVID-19. The case was dismissed.

== Biography ==
Najadi was born in Lucerne, Switzerland, on August 20, 1967, to Bahraini financier Hussain Najadi and Swiss Heidi Anderhub-Minger, a direct descendant of former Swiss Federal Counsel and Swiss President Rudolf Minger. He finished his early education at the Military Service and School in Switzerland, then pursued economics at Institut auf dem Rosenberg, St. Gallen, Switzerland.

== Career ==
In 1989, Najadi began working as a public relations assistant for Klaus J. Stöhlker at Klaus J. Stöhlker AG in Zollikon, Switzerland. Later that year, he was hired as an account executive for sales of open-end mutual funds to Swiss banks by Orbitex Finanz AG in Zurich, Switzerland.

From 1993 until 2003, Najadi served as a management board member at Dresdner Bank, London and was in charge of capital markets business covering Central Europe, Central Asia, the Russian Federation, Africa and the Middle East.

After his father, Hussain Najadi, was assassinated in Kuala Lumpur in 2013, he claimed that the Malaysian government and president covered his father's murderers.

Najadi previously served as chief representative to the Socialist Republic of Vietnam for Bombardier Aerospace, representing the Canadian aerospace manufacturer in the region.

In 2012, Najadi was among the investors supporting a takeover bid for Portsmouth F.C., led by London investment banker and former Football League chairman Keith Harris.

In 2023, Najadi filed a civil case against Pfizer in New York City, alleging harm from the Pfizer-BioNTech COVID-19 vaccine.

On October 27, 2023, he claimed he was appointed ambassador-at-large by the Conseil gouvernemental de l'Etat de Savoie, which self-declared the "Independence of the State of Savoie" from France. The claim has no legal legitimacy, and the Savoie remains a department of France.

In 2023, he affirmed during a meeting in support of Chloé Frammery that justice had dismissed a complaint filed against Alain Berset, whom he held responsible for an illness that he contracted following his vaccination against COVID-19. In an interview, Najadi stated that he did not believe in anthropogenic climate change, claiming that "there is no global warming." The comment was made while discussing his legal complaint against Swiss Federal Councillor Alain Berset, which was dismissed by the courts.

Since April 2026, Najadi has served as the principal of GeoStrat Agency LLC, located at 1500 K Street NW, Washington, D.C.
