= The Sudden Loneliness of Konrad Steiner =

1976 film

- Directed by: Kurt Gloor
- Produced by: Kurt Gloor
- Starring: Sigfrit Steiner
- Cinematography: Franz Rath
- Release date: 1976
- Country: Switzerland
- Language: Swiss German

The Sudden Loneliness of Konrad Steiner (German: Die plötzliche Einsamkeit des Konrad Steiner) is a 1976 Swiss drama film directed by Kurt Gloor. It was entered into the 26th Berlin International Film Festival.

== Cast ==
- Sigfrit Steiner as Konrad Steiner
- Silvia Jost as Claudia Hefti
- Helmut Förnbacher as Peter Steiner
- Helene Friedli as Yvonne Steiner
- Ettore Cella as Carlo Reni
- Alfred Rasser as Hans Sonderegger
