= Hussain Najadi =

Banker

Hussain Najadi (Arabic: حسين نجدي; c. 1938 – 29 July 2013) was an international banker born in Bahrain to parents of Persian origin. He was the Chairman & CEO of AIAK Group based in Kuala Lumpur, Malaysia.

== Banking career ==
Najadi was the first Bahraini merchant banker to link Middle Eastern countries to the economies of Malaysia and other ASEAN member countries from 1974. AIAK Group, in 1975, founded the Arab Malaysian Development Banking Group (AMDB), now a $32 billion banking group in Asia, with an initial paid in capital of $2 million. AMDB soon became one of the largest banks in Malaysia and was rebranded as AmBank in 2002.

Najadi was appointed from 1978 to 1985 by the Governor of the Central Bank of Malaysia as a non-executive independent director of the Malaysian Industrial Development Finance Berhad, an industrial and merchant bank in Malaysia.

== Diversification of activities ==
Najadi acquired in 1968 from UBS Group, Supramar AG, a hydrofoil specialist based in Lucerne, Switzerland. He expanded its operations world wide and established over 200 hydrofoil lines.

Najadi was the Chairman of Free2move Asia, a joint venture firm with Free2move AB, of Sweden, in the field of RFID and sensor networks. The company was fully acquired by Free2move Holdings AB, Sweden, in August 2010 upon which Najadi resigned.

== Education ==
Najadi was also the founder and former Director of EURO-ASIAN CENTER at INSEAD, Fontainebleau, France (1977–85). Najadi was a visiting lecturer in Business Management in Asia.

Najadi was the first Chairman of developing countries gathering at Davos Economic Symposium (now known as World Economic Forum), in Davos, Switzerland.

== Assassination ==
On 29 July 2013, Najadi was fatally shot. His Malaysian-Chinese wife Cheong Mei Kuen, 49, sustained serious injuries when they were shot at close range in a parking lot, after leaving the Guan Yin Temple, a Chinese temple in Lorong Ceylon, Kuala Lumpur. A gunman who had crept up from behind fired at Najadi, 75, and his 49-year-old wife from a close range, killing the prominent banker on the spot in the car park.

Najadi sustained two wounds to the chest while his wife was wounded in her left hand and right leg in the incident. Initial police investigations revealed that the gunman was among three people who had waited outside the temple for Najadi, who was in a private discussion with a colleague involving a property transaction. The gunman was believed to have escaped in a taxi together with his accomplices.

Arrests were made on 5 August 2013 of a 42 year-old man and two women in separate locations in the city to assist in investigations. "The male suspect surrendered himself at the Kuala Lumpur police contingent headquarters, the Police is quoted stating: "He is believed to have been at the crime scene with the taxi driver and the shooter."

On 16 August 2013, the taxi driver, Chew Siang Chee, arrested by the Malaysian Police for allegedly transporting the assassin who killed Najadi, claimed trial to the possession of a firearm and ammunition at the Sessions Court. Chew was one of three suspects detained during the police pursuit of the hitman, who was initially identified by his nickname “Sei Ngan Chai” (literally, in Cantonese, meaning Four-Eyed Kid) but who was later identified by his real name, Koong Swee Kwan.

During the investigations, Najadi's son Pascal Najadi, a Swiss citizen based in Moscow said, "My father died for reporting corruption within Malaysia. Here (in Moscow) I feel protected and safe. I can only return to Malaysia once we know who and why." The 46-year-old banker added: "The world stands still when such horror terrorises you." Pascal's security advisers had told him not to return to Malaysia until the killer was behind bars. Consequently, he did not attend his father's funeral.

On 23 September 2013, the Malaysian Police captured the wanted hitman, Koong Swee Kwan who was charged and tried for murder. On 5 September 2014, Justice Mohd Azman Husin of the Kuala Lumpur High Court found Koong guilty of murder and sentenced him to death. Koong was also convicted of the attempted murder of Najadi's wife and received a prison sentence of 18 years.

In November 2015, the Malaysian police announced that they were no longer looking for suspects in the killing and had closed the case. On 1 March 2021, Koong's final appeal was dismissed by the Federal Court of Malaysia and his death sentence for the murder was upheld.

On 21 August 2024, the Federal Court dismissed Koong's re-sentencing plea and once again upheld his death sentence.
