= Rebecca Indermaur =

Swiss actress (born 1976)

- Born: 1976 (age 49–50); Chur, Grisons, Switzerland
- Education: University of the Arts Bern
- Occupation: Actress
- Years active: 2008–present
- Father: Robert Indermaur
- Family: In der Maur

Rebecca Indermaur (born 1976) is a Swiss film and television actress. She is best known for her roles as Theres in the 2010 horror film Sennentuntschi, Geissenpeterin in the 2015 children's film Heidi, and as Mona in the 2018 romantic comedy-drama Amur senza fin.

== Early life and family ==
Rebecca Indermaur was born in 1976 and raised in Chur, Grisons and is a member of the In der Maur family. Her father is Swiss painter Robert Indermaur. She was introduced to acting by her parents who ran and lived above a small theater, Klibühni Schnidrzunft, often participating in theatrical performances and art shows. She attended Bern University of Music and Theater in Bern, Switzerland.

== Career ==
Indermaur has had roles in various films and television shows including Easy Tiger (2008), Sennentuntschi (2010), Die Käserei in Goldingen (2010), Tatort: Skalpell (2012), Nebelgrind (2012), Heidi (2015), and Rider Jack (2015). She has also been in Foggrind and Crime Scene:Suicide. In 2018 she starred in the horror-thriller film The Shed. Indermaur, a native German speaker, learned to speak Romansh for her lead role as Mona in the 2018 romantic television feature Amur senza fin, the first Romansh television feature film.

== Filmography ==
Indermaur's filmography includes:

Year	Title	Role	Notes
2008	Easy Tiger	Elena	
2010	Sennentuntschi	Theres	
2010	Stationspiraten	Jonas' Mutter	
2010	Die Käserei in Goldingen	Maria	
2012	Nebelgrind	Fränzi	
2012	Tatort	Debbie Zurbuchen / Frau Bucher	2 episodes
2015	Rider Jack	Milena Hefti	
2015	Heidi	Geissenpeterin	
2016	Finsteres Glück	Sandra	
2017	Wilder	Denise Siegenthaler	
2018	The Shed		
2018	Amur senza fin	Mona	
2022–2025	Die Beschatter	Alexandra Vonlanthen	8 episodes
