= Kurt Gloor =

Swiss film director (1942–1997)

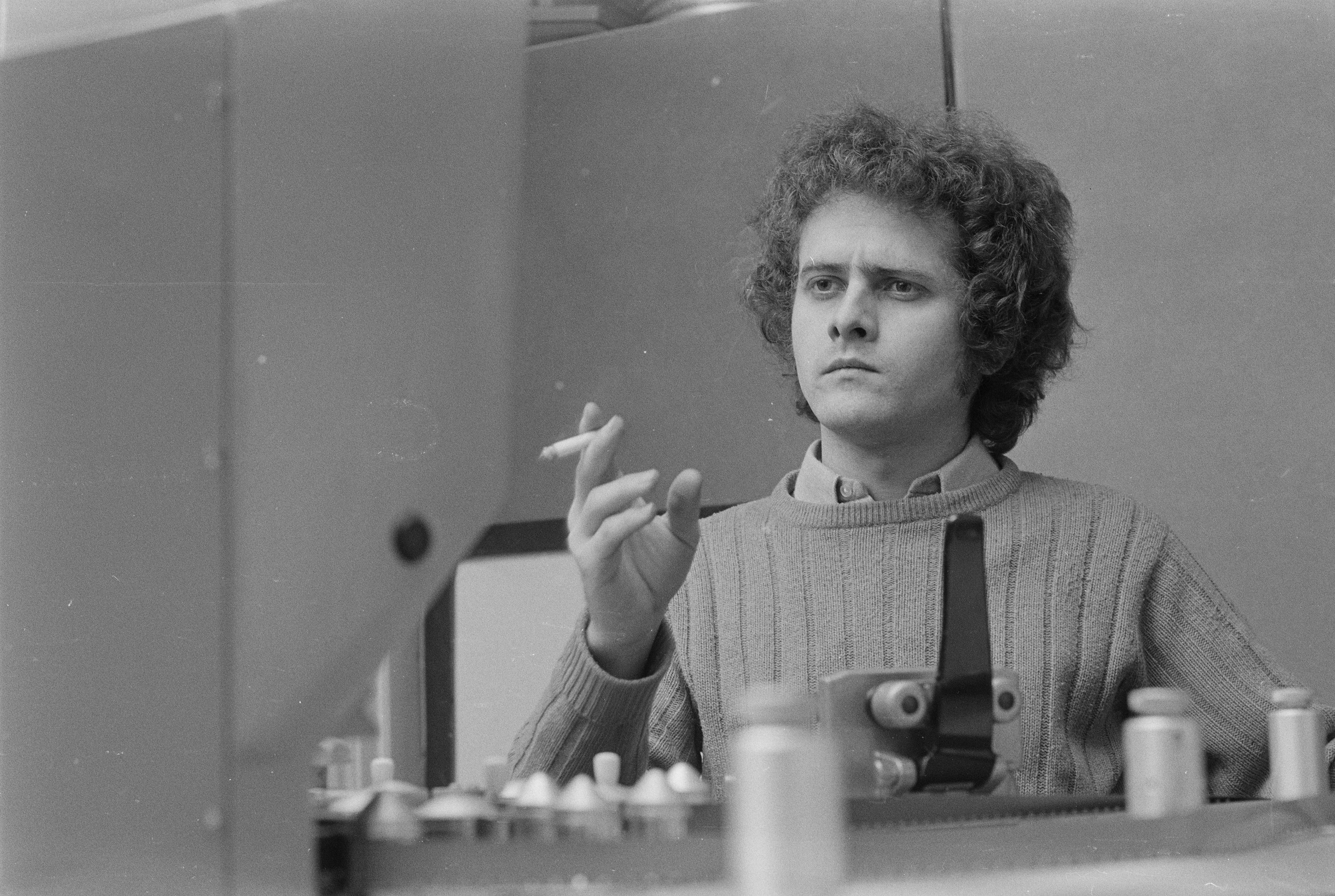
- Gloor in 1972
- Born: 8 November 1942; Zurich, Switzerland
- Died: 20 September 1997 (aged 54); Zurich, Switzerland
- Occupations: Film director, screenwriter, film producer
- Years active: 1969–1997

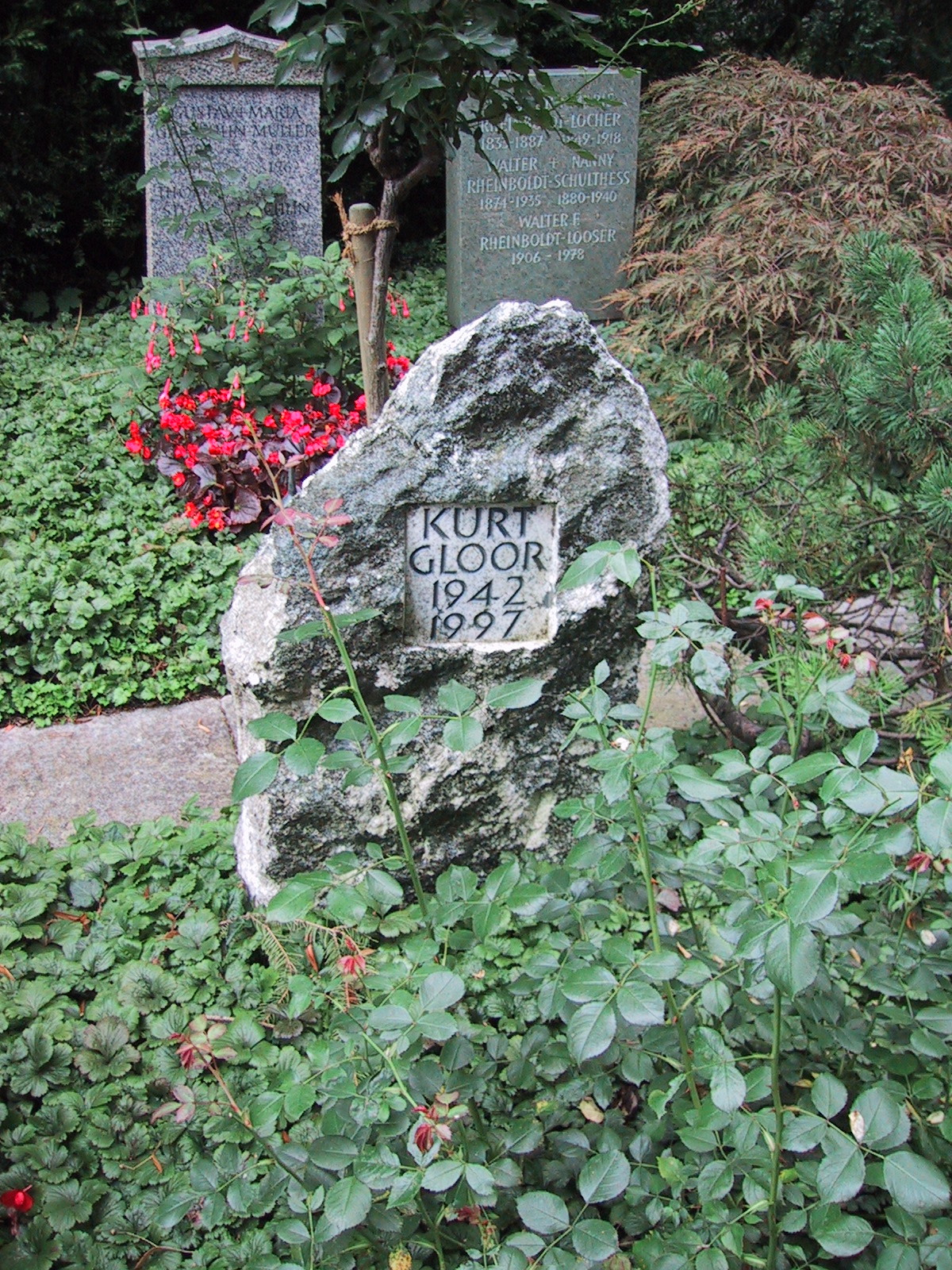
Grave of Kurt Gloor at Manegg Cemetery, Zurich

Kurt Gloor (8 November 1942 – 20 September 1997) was a Swiss film director, screenwriter and producer associated with the New Swiss Cinema. His work explored social conditions and the lives of people on the margins of society. His first feature film, Die plötzliche Einsamkeit des Konrad Steiner (1976), brought him wider recognition, and in the 1990s he shifted his focus to documentaries for Swiss television.

== Biography ==
Kurt Gloor was born on 8 November 1942 in Zurich. He studied at Zurich's Kunstgewerbeschule and completed training in graphic design. After his training, he worked as a graphic designer in Vienna and Zurich. He later gained experience as a camera assistant on advertising films. In 1969, he became an independent filmmaker and producer and established his own film production company. Screenwriting was also part of his work from that year.

In 1990, Gloor began contributing to Swiss television's documentary unit as both a journalist and director. From 1993, he concentrated entirely on documentary productions for Swiss television, after several major projects had failed to come to fruition and he had suffered financial losses. Gloor also wrote as a journalist for the Neue Zürcher Zeitung and Weltwoche.

In 1977, he received the Film Prize of the City of Zurich. Gloor died by suicide in Zurich on 20 September 1997.

== Work ==
Gloor became part of the New Swiss Cinema generation, making documentaries that addressed social issues. His films sought to draw attention to people who were oppressed, marginalised or dependent. He researched his subjects closely and used local dialect in his films.

Die Landschaftsgärtner (1969) portrayed Swiss mountain farmers, while EX (1970) addressed alcoholism in Switzerland. In Die Landschaftsgärtner, Gloor challenged idealised images of Swiss farming through his depiction of rural working life. The film won the FIPRESCI Award at Oberhausen.

Die grünen Kinder (1971) examined modern housing developments, specifically the negative effects of life in the Swiss countryside on people relocated there. A controversy followed it when an award decision in Zurich was reversed by the Swiss Parliament and the jury subsequently resigned. Die besten Jahre (1973–1974) focused on married women, arguing that emancipation cannot be achieved without a favourable political and cultural climate.

Gloor's first feature film, Die plötzliche Einsamkeit des Konrad Steiner, brought him wider attention in 1976. He wrote the leading role specifically for Sigfrit Steiner. In developing the film, he carried out research in institutions for older people and spoke extensively with elderly people. The film linked the experience of ageing with the decline of small urban businesses.

For Der Erfinder (1981), Gloor drew on a stage play by Hansjörg Schneider. The film was nominated for the Golden Bear at the Berlin International Film Festival and the Gold Hugo at the Chicago International Film Festival, and won the OCIC Award at the San Sebastián International Film Festival. He wrote the leading role specifically for Bruno Ganz.

For Mann ohne Gedächtnis (1984), Gloor drew on the case of an unidentified man found in the Bernese Jura in 1980 who neither spoke nor carried identification. The film reworked the case as a modern Kaspar Hauser story. Michael König played the central character without speaking a word. As part of his preparation, Gloor completed a placement at the Waldau psychiatric clinic.

Gloor's last film, Trekking am Limit (1997), documented a week-long trek through the Jura involving 15 inmates from Witzwil prison and 10 people with disabilities. Gloor accompanied the journey with a film crew, recording participants travelling on foot, by wheelchair, kayak and horse-drawn wagon.

== Selected filmography ==
A selection of Gloor's films as director includes:

- Mondo Karies (1969)
- Die Landschaftsgärtner (1969)
- EX (1970)
- Die grünen Kinder (1971)
- Die besten Jahre (1973–1974)
- Die plötzliche Einsamkeit des Konrad Steiner (1976)
- Der Chinese (1978)
- Der Erfinder (1981)
- Mann ohne Gedächtnis (1984)
- Jessica – Die ersten Tage im Leben eines Methadonbabys (1992)
- Leben unter Riesen (1995)
- Mit einem Fuss im Jenseits (1996)
- Trekking am Limit (1997)

== Legacy ==
In October 1998, 3sat presented a retrospective to Gloor comprising twelve of his documentary films and the feature film Der Erfinder. Schweizer Fernsehen DRS described Gloor after his death as one of its most prominent documentary filmmakers.
