= Man Without Memory =

1984 film

- Directed by: Kurt Gloor
- Written by: Kurt Gloor
- Starring: Michael König; Hannelore Elsner
- Cinematography: Franz Rath
- Edited by: Helena Gerber
- Release date: 1984
- Running time: 90 minutes
- Country: Switzerland
- Language: German

Man Without Memory (German: Mann ohne Gedächtnis) is a 1984 Swiss drama film directed by Kurt Gloor. It was entered into the 34th Berlin International Film Festival.

== Cast ==
- Michael König as the man without memory
- Lisi Mangold as Lisa Brunner
- Hannelore Elsner as Dr. Essner
- Siegfried W. Kernen as Dr. Huber
- Esther Christinat as Schwester Mehret
- László I. Kish as Pfleger Jonas
- Rudolf Bissegger as Dr. Schellbert
- Rüdiger Vogler
