= Tonia Maria Zindel =

Swiss actress (born 1972)

- Born: 15 July 1972 (age 54); Scuol, Grisons; Switzerland
- Education: Acting Academy of Zürich
- Occupation: actress
- Years active: 1993–present
- Children: 3

Tonia Maria Zindel (born 15 July 1972) is a Swiss actress. She is known for her roles as Maja Lüthi in Lüthi und Blanc and Giulia in Amur senza fin.

== Biography ==
Zindel was born and raised in Scuol, Grisons. She is a native Romansh speaker. In 1992 she was admitted to the Acting Academy of Zürich. Her first major role was in the Swiss television film Crime Scene: Brainwashing. Later in the 1990s she landed roles in the Swiss television series The Director and the Swiss soap opera Lüthi und Blanc. Since 2000, she has had major roles in Swiss film and television including in Dolce Vita & Co, Charly's Comeback, Schellen-Ursli, and Amur senza fin.

She is married and has three children.

== Filmography ==
- 1993: The Lost Hole
- 1993: Crime scene : brainwashing
- 1993: Justice
- 1994-1995: The Director (TV series)
- 1998: A Deadly Relationship
- 1999: Bill Diamond
- 1999: The Stranger Girl
- 1999-2006: Lüthi und Blanc (TV series)
- 2002: Dolce Vita & Co (TV series) - episode: The Mischpoche
- 2010: Charly's Comeback
- 2011: Family Makes You Happy
- 2015: Schellen-Ursli
- 2017: The Undertaker (TV Series) - Season 5, Episode 2
- 2018: Amur senza fin
