= Linda Geiser =

Swiss actress

- Born: Linda Geiser; May 13, 1935 (age 91); Köniz, Switzerland
- Citizenship: Swiss
- Education: University of the Arts Bern; HB Studio
- Occupations: Actress, art patron
- Years active: 1954–present

Linda Geiser (born May 13, 1935) is a Swiss film and television actress and art patron who was primarily known for her roles in Swiss television and theatre productions, such as Lüthi und Blanc in the 2000s.

Since 1961, Geiser has permanently resided in New York City, where she had been active as patron of the arts. She was among the founders of the Swiss Institute Contemporary Art New York which promotes Swiss artists. Her patronage includes the Bern stipend program which gives artists the opportunity to train in New York each year under Geiser's guidance.

== Early life and education ==
Geiser was born May 13, 1935 in Köniz, Switzerland, the second of three children, to Samuel "Sami" Geiser (1907–1993) and Gertrud "Trudy" Geiser (née Joss). She has an older sister, Annemarie Bachofner (née Geiser) and a younger brother, Hans Beat Geiser.

She was raised in Spiegel (part of Köniz) and attended local schools, some classes together with Elisabeth Kopp. Geiser attended acting school at the University of the Arts Bern and learned English in Bern. In 1959, she first traveled to the United States, visiting relatives in Ohio and New York. In 1961, aged 26, she moved to New York City permanently, where she took roles in theatre and broadway while studying acting at HB Studio.

== Career ==
In 1964, she made a controversial appearance in Sidney Lumet's The Pawnbroker by playing a scene in which she fully exposed her breasts. At the time, this contravened the Motion Picture Production Code and was one of the earliest instances of a nude scene in a mainstream film.

== Filmography ==
Year	Title	Role	Notes
1954	Uli, der Knecht	Uersi	
1955	Ingrid - Die Geschichte eines Fotomodells		
1955	The Royal Waltz	Prinzessin Elisabeth 'Sissi' von Bayern	
1956	Die wilde Auguste	Martina	
1957	Der 10. Mai	Anna Marti	
1960	Anne Bäbi Jowäger - I. Teil: Wie Jakobli zu einer Frau kommt	Lisi	
1961	Zu jung für die Liebe?	Marianne Lorenz	
1962	So toll wie anno dazumal		
1964	The Pawnbroker	Ruth Nazerman	
1968	Die sechs Kummerbuben	Sophie Kummer	
1976	Der große Horizont	Christine	TV movie
1999	Lüthi und Blanc	Johanna Blanc	TV series
2004	Lilo & Fredi	Lilo	TV movie
2004	Oeschenen	Elsbeth Aellig	TV movie
2006	Handyman	Flugzeuggast	

== Personal life ==
In 1979, Geiser purchased a dilapidated red brick building, in East Village, Manhattan for $38,000 (approximately $160,000 in 2025), right across from the 9th precinct, New York City Police Department. The custodian of the building insisted on buying that she should buy it from him, so she subsequently mortgaged her parental property outside of Bern to raise the funds for the purchase. For over four decades, she rented apartments and rooms affordably, to artists, musicians and other creatives, who temporarily came to New York.

In 2024, she sold the property, and moved temporarily back to her native Switzerland, where she resides in a retirement home. For over 40 years, she has been in a relationship with John Durgin (born 1958), a former barista and handyman, whom she met in the early 1980s. She does not have children.
