= Grounding (film) =

Grounding - Die letzten Tage der Swissair
- Directed by: Michael Steiner, Tobias Fueter
- Written by: Michael Sauter, Michael Steiner, René Lüchinger, Tobias Fueter
- Produced by: Peter Reichenbach, Peter-Christian Fueter, Pascal Najadi
- Cinematography: Filip Zumbrunn
- Edited by: Tobias Fueter
- Music by: Adrian Frutiger
- Distributed by: Filmcoopi Zürich
- Release date: January 2006
- Running time: 120 minutes
- Country: Switzerland
- Language: Swiss German

Grounding: Die letzten Tage der Swissair (Grounding: The Last Days of Swissair) is a 2006 Swiss drama film directed by Michael Steiner and Tobias Fueter. It depicts the final days before the grounding of Swissair’s fleet on 2 October 2001 and the events leading to the airline’s collapse. The film received positive-to-mixed reviews and drew close to 400,000 admissions in Switzerland in 2006.

== Synopsis ==
The film depicts the final days before the grounding of Swissair’s fleet on 2 October 2001 and the events that led to the airline’s collapse. It also shows how the crisis affects ordinary people whose lives are disrupted by the downfall.

== Cast ==
The cast includes:

- Hanspeter Müller as Mario Corti
- László I. Kish as Moritz Suter
- Michael Neuenschwander as André Dosé
- Gilles Tschudi as Marcel Ospel
- Rainer Guldener as Lukas Mühlemann
- Pasquale Aleardi as Peter Landolt
- Hans Heinz Moser as Hanspeter Frieden

== Background ==
At the time of the film’s preview screening in January 2006, the collapse of Swissair remained a subject of public controversy, including debate over whether the airline could have been saved.

== Music ==
The film’s score was composed by Adrian Frutiger. Discussing the cue for the scene in which flight operations are halted, Frutiger said that he had only four hours to write it and chose music that emphasizes loss rather than matching the on-screen agitation directly.

== Reception ==
Filmbulletin called the film a precisely timed and gripping docudrama, but argued that some of its fictional subplots rely too heavily on cliché. OutNow described Grounding as a strong and engaging film, while similarly criticising its more soap-opera-like fictional storylines. The film drew close to 400,000 admissions in Switzerland in 2006.

== Festival screenings ==
Following its January 2006 premiere, Grounding screened at festivals including the Locarno Film Festival in 2006 and 2012, the Göteborg Film Festival and the European Film Market in 2007, and the Zurich Film Festival in 2016.
