= Cargo (2009 film) =

- Official film poster
- Directed by: Ivan Engler; Ralph Etter
- Written by: Arnold Bucher; Ivan Engler; Patrik Steinmann
- Produced by: Marcel Wolfisberg; Ivan Engler; Meret Burger; Florian Nussbaumer
- Starring: Anna-Katharina Schwabroh; Martin Rapold; Michael Finger; Claude-Oliver Rudolph; Yangzom Brauen; Pierre Semmler; Regula Grauwiller; Gilles Tschudi; Maria Boettner
- Cinematography: Ralph Baetschmann
- Music by: Fredrik Strömberg
- Production company: Atlantis Pictures
- Release date: September 24, 2009
- Running time: 112 minutes
- Country: Switzerland
- Language: German
- Budget: 4.5 million CHF

Cargo is a 2009 science fiction film, the first from Swiss production and the first major feature film by Ivan Engler and Ralph Etter.

== Plot ==
It is the year 2267. After the Earth has become uninhabitable due to an ecological collapse, the remaining people live on overcrowded space stations in Earth's orbit. The young doctor Laura Portmann (Anna Katharina Schwabroh) is one of them. She hopes for a better future alongside her sister on the distant planet Rhea (unrelated to Saturn's moon Rhea). As she needs money to fund the journey, she signs up with Kuiper Enterprises for a job on the decrepit cargo ship Kassandra, heading for an eight-year flight to unmanned Station #42 and back.

The crew consists of five members: Captain Lacroix (Pierre Semmler), Lindbergh (Regula Grauwiller), Yoshida (Yangzom Brauen), Prokoff (Claude-Oliver Rudolph), and Vespucci (Michael Finger). Crew members spend most of the fully automated flight in deep cryosleep while one person stays awake in 8½ month shifts to monitor the ship. Due to the current terrorist threat from the radical Neo-Luddite group Maschinenstürmer ("Machine Strikers"), there is also an additional security guard aboard: Samuel Decker (Martin Rapold). Toward the end of her shift, Portmann hears unusual noises from the cargo bay, and feels as though she is being observed. She finds Decker awake. He explains he was woken up to do safety checks on the ship. Together they awaken Lacroix to investigate the strange phenomena. When Lacroix is killed, the rest of the colleagues are awakened, and together the crew sets out to investigate.

The crew discover a young girl in suspended animation inside a cargo container that was supposed to contain construction materials. Inspecting the girl's body, Portmann finds a "perfected" virtual reality connector embedded in the girl's spine. Decker is suspected of killing Lacroix. Meanwhile, Lindberg takes over as captain. Later, Portmann sends an account of her finding to her sister on Rhea, and receives a reply in 20 minutes, rather than the usual matter of years. Portmann begins to wonder where the spaceship is really going and what cargo is actually being transported. The crew confronts Decker thinking he killed Lacroix when it is found he has woken up several times from cryo sleep. Decker is arrested by the crew. Portman asks Yoshida to figure out the ships coordinates and believes Lindbergh to be lying to them.

It eventually emerges that Rhea is actually a virtual reality simulation designed to keep the remaining humans hopeful about their future; the people in the cargo hold are going to be wired into a large mainframe, which is the ship's true destination. Upon discovering this, the crew decide to put an end to the deception. Decker is found to have known this all along. He explains that on Earth, he and others found the planet to still be liveable. Lindbergh is found to have been deceiving them. Decker and the other crew members decide to team up against Lindbergh and sabotage the virtual reality. Upon arriving at their destination and while the ship automatically unloads its cargo, Portman enters the simulation to broadcast a "final transmission from Rhea", which reveals the simulated nature of the planet to the remaining humans, while Decker sabotages the mainframe's antenna.

== Cast ==
- Anna Katharina Schwabroh as Laura Portmann
- Martin Rapold as Samuel Decker
- Michael Finger as Claudio Vespucci
- Claude-Oliver Rudolph as Igor Prokoff
- Yangzom Brauen as Miyuki Yoshida
- Pierre Semmler as Pierre Lacroix
- Regula Grauwiller as Anna Lindbergh
- Gilles Tschudi as Klaus Bruckner
- Maria Boettner as Arianne Portmann
- Noa Strupler as Kleines Mädchen

== Reception ==
Cargo has an approval rating of 60% on review aggregator website Rotten Tomatoes, based on 5 reviews, and an average rating of 5.3/10.

== See also ==
- List of films featuring space stations
- List of dystopian films
