= Andrew Coburn (author) =

American writer (1932–2018)

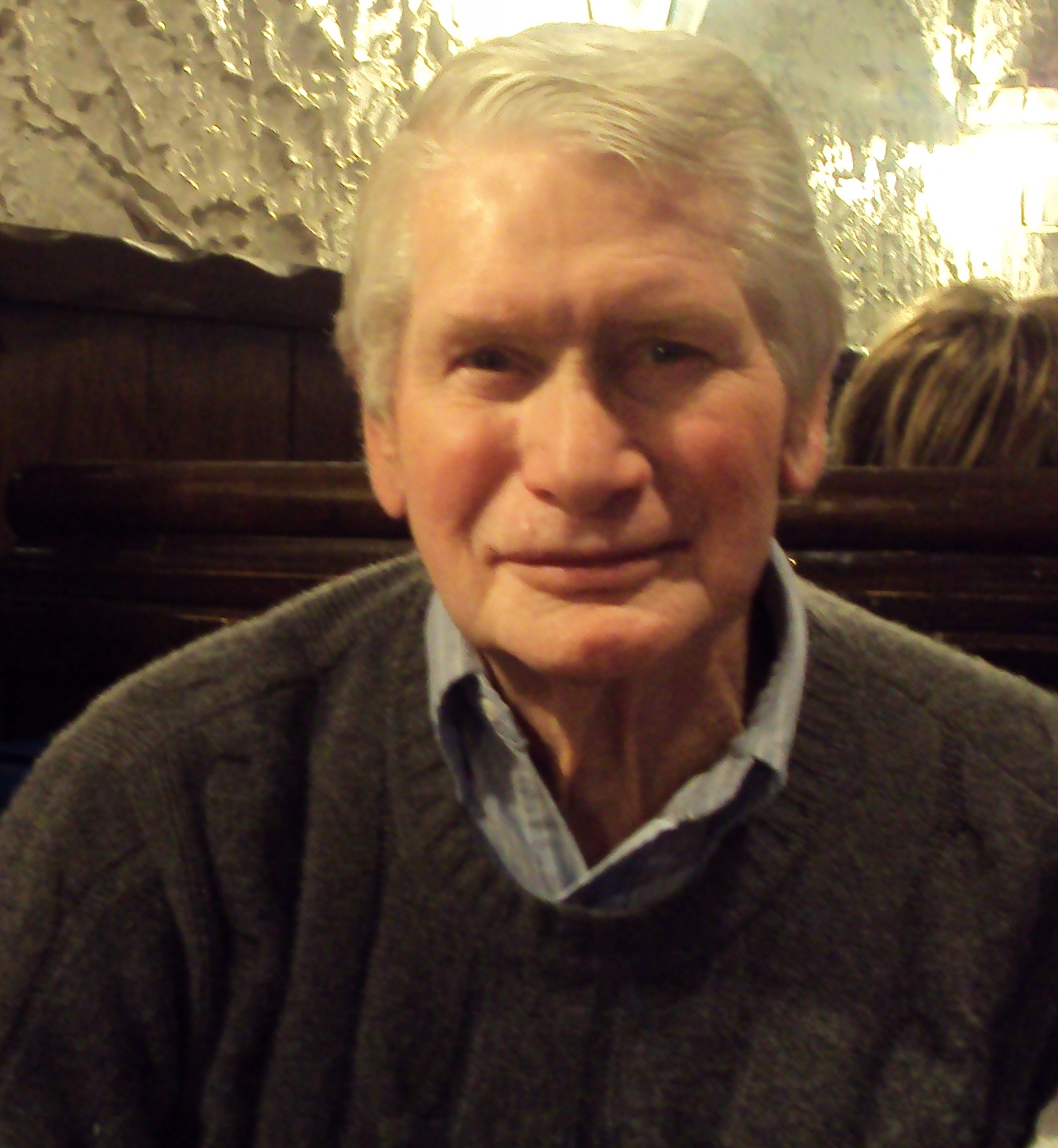
- Born: May 1, 1932; Exeter, New Hampshire, U.S.
- Died: August 7, 2018 (aged 86)
- Occupation: Author
- Spouse: Bernadine Casey Coburn
- Writing career
- Language: English
- Genre: Fiction

Andrew Coburn (May 1, 1932 – August 7, 2018) was an American writer from Exeter, New Hampshire. A New York Times best-selling novelist, short-story author, essayist and newspaper reporter and columnist, Coburn was the author of 13 novels which have been translated into over 14 languages throughout the world.

He was married to Bernadine Casey Coburn, a former journalist and publicist now teaching writing at a women's jail, with whom he has one son and four daughters. They lived in Andover, Massachusetts.

== Literary career ==
Coburn's early journalism career included publishing his own newspapers The Journal of Greater Lawrence and Greater Lawrence Today, having begun his career at the Lawrence Eagle Tribune in North Andover, Massachusetts. Many of his articles have been archived at the Lawrence Public Library. A comprehensive lifetime collection of his manuscripts, journals, newspaper articles and personal correspondence are catalogued at Special Collections, University Of Massachusetts, Amherst. ( http://scua.library.umass.edu/umarmot/coburn-andrew/ )

Coburn's most recent project is a novella titled Spouses & Other Crimes, which is a collection of 11 short stories first published in periodicals, literary magazines and online. It was due to be released in October, 2014.

== Film adaptations ==
Three of his novels have been adapted into films.

- Off Duty (1980) was adapted into the French film Un dimanche de flic by director Michel Vianey.
- Widow's Walk (1984) was adapted into the French film Noyade interdite (1987), starring Philippe Noiret and Guy Marchand, for which he was nominated for France's national film award, the César Award.
- Sweetheart (1985) was adapted into the French film, Toutes peines confondues (1992). The film was distributed worldwide including Germany under the title Sweetheart, and in Italy under the title Marbel. Although first released over two decades ago, Sweetheart remains a popular cult film to this day.

== Bibliography ==
=== Novels ===
- The Trespassers (1974)
- The Babysitter (1979)
- Off Duty (1980)
- Company Secrets (1982)
- Widow's Walk (1984)
- Sweetheart (1985)
- Love Nest (1987)
- Goldilocks (1989)
- No Way Home (1992)
- Voices in the Dark (1994)
- Birthright (1998)
- On the Loose (2006)
- My Father's Daughter (novella 2007)
- Spouses & Other Crimes (to be released October, 2014)

=== Non-fiction ===
- "Plum Island" (2007)
- Updike of Ipswich (2009)

=== Stories ===
Some 30 of his uncollected short stories appear in various literary journals. The Transatlantic Review (New York, London) published his early short fiction.

== Awards ==
- Eugene Saxton Fellowship, 1965
- United Press Award (UPI), 1967 (for journalism) Lawrence Eagle Tribune, North Andover, Massachusetts
- Associated Press Award, (AP), 1968 (for journalism) Lawrence Eagle Tribune, North Andover, Massachusetts
- Editors' Award for Fiction, "Hearty Women", Fifth Wednesday Journal, 2009

=== Other honors and nominations ===
- Awarded an honorary doctor of Letters from Merrimack College, North Andover, Massachusetts, 1987, honoring both his writing career in journalism and as a novelist
- Edgar Allan Poe Award nominee for Goldilocks, (1989)
- Nominated for Pushcart Award, 2009, "Hearty Women," 2009
- Named in Contrary Magazine's 10-year commemorative issue for best short stories for his short story, "Plum Island", 2013
