= Robert Indermaur =

Swiss artist

- Born: June 9, 1947 (age 79); Chur, Grisons, Switzerland
- Occupations: Painter; sculptor
- Spouse: Barbara Indermaur
- Children: 3 (including Rebecca Indermaur)
- Website: Indermaur.net

Robert Indermaur (born 9 June 1947) is a Swiss painter and sculptor. Originally trained as a schoolteacher, Indermaur became a freelance artist in 1969, producing contemporary paintings and sculptures. He rose to prominence in the 1970s, and created pieces for public spaces in both Switzerland and Liechtenstein. Indermaur also ran the Klibühni Schnidrzunft, a regional theatre in Chur, for ten years with his wife and children, including the actress Rebecca Indermaur.

== Personal life ==
Robert Indermaur was born on 9 June 1947 in Chur, Switzerland, the second of three children. He is a member of the In der Maur family. He attended the Bündner Lehrerseminar school in Chur and in 1967 graduated from a teaching seminar course. Upon graduation, he traveled around Europe, Asia, and Africa. For the next year he worked as a primary school teacher in St. Antönien. In 1974 he met a woman named Barbara whom he married in 1975 and had three children; Rebecca, Alexander, and Adrian. Together they founded a "small theater" in Chur, called the Klibühni Schnidrzunft. They ran it for ten years and lived in an apartment above it. In 1983 he moved to Almens. As of 2009, Indermaur was a practicing Scientologist and a financial contributor to the Church of Scientology.

== Artistic career ==
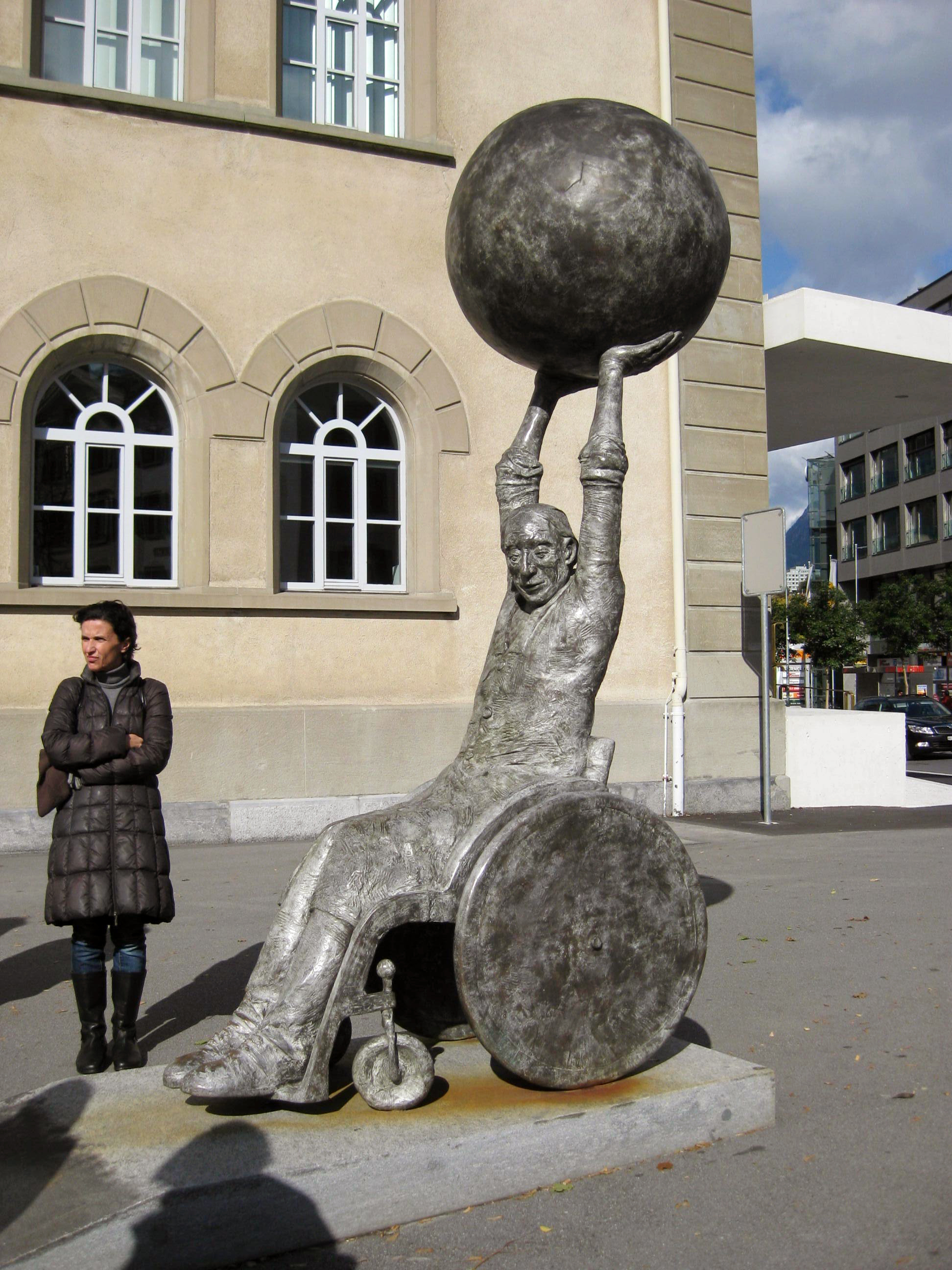
Sculpture by Indermaur in Chur

Indermaur became a freelance artist in 1969. His paintings began to garner significant attention in the mid-1970s.

Indermaur tends to paint in series, creating as many as 50–75 works all related to a single theme. From 1982 to 1983 he painted sofas and from 1986 to 1987 he painted a "between rooms" series, which displayed subjects in doorways and hallways.

In 1977, Indermaur and graphic artist Albert Brun published the satirical magazine Das Ballhorn in six editions.

In 2011, Indermaur was among a list of artists who signed the Declaration of Swiss Artists Responding to the Palestinian Appeal for Solidarity.
