= Hans Heinz Moser =

Swiss actor

- Born: 9 May 1936; Bern, Switzerland
- Died: 5 April 2017 (aged 80); Glattfelden, Switzerland
- Occupation: Actor
- Years active: 1968–2006

Hans Heinz Moser (9 May 1936 – 5 April 2017) was a Swiss television and film actor.

== Filmography ==
| Year | Title | Role | Notes |
|---|---|---|---|
| 1968 | Der Meteor | Schafroth | TV movie |
| 1978 | Stilleben | Max | |
| 1979 | Der Chinese | Wachtmeister Studer | TV movie |
| 1980 | Matto regiert | Wachtmeister Studer | TV movie |
| 1982 | Das Flugjahr | Albert Müller | |
| 1982 | The Confessions of Felix Krull | Herr Sturzil | Miniseries |
| 1983 | Point Hope | Winnie | TV movie |
| 1991 | Family Express | Charly | |
| 1992 | Toutes peines confondues | Scatamacchia | |
| 1999–2006 | Lüthi und Blanc | Jean-Jacques Blanc | 288 episodes |
| 2006 | Grounding – Die letzten Tage der Swissair | Hanspeter Frieden | (final film role) |
