= Lisi Mangold =

Swiss actress (1950–1986)

Lisi Mangold (24 April 1950 – 4 January 1986) was a Swiss actress.

== Life ==
She trained at the Schauspielschule Zürich and got her first engagement at the Schillertheater in Berlin. There she played in Wildwechsel by Franz Xaver Kroetz.

From 1974 until her death she belonged to the ensemble of the Munich Kammerspiele, where Ernst Wendt made her the leading actress of his productions. She was the Käthe in Gerhart Hauptmann's Einsame Menschen (1975), Hero in Viel Lärm um nichts (1975), Elisabeth in Horváth's Glaube Liebe Hoffnung (1975), Natascha in Gorki's Nachtasyl (1976), Rita in Thomas Brasch's Lovely Rita (1978), Luise in Intrigue and Love (1978) and assumed the title role in Das Käthchen von Heilbronn (1979) as well as in August Strindberg's Fräulein Julie (1980). In 1981 Lisi Mangold impersonated Princess Leonore in Torquato Tasso, in 1982 Celia in Wie es euch gefällt. In 1984 she played Minna in Minna by Barnhelm.

She also took on several roles in television productions and in the German-language radio play version of Douglas Adams' The Hitchhiker's Guide to the Galaxy - again directed by Ernst Wendt.

Lisi Mangold died of cancer at the age of 35. She was in a relationship with the actor Charles Brauer for many years until her death.

== Filmography ==
- 1977: Tatort: Finderlohn (TV)
- 1977: The Serpent's Egg
- 1978: Germany in Autumn
- 1981: Trokadero
- 1984: Die schwarzen Brüder (TV miniseries)
- 1984: Man Without Memory
- 1985: Die Mitläufer

== Radio drama ==
- 1976: Jean Chatenet: Die Wölfin – Regie: Raoul Wolfgang Schnell

== Literature ==
- Thomas Blubacher: Lisi Mangold. In: Andreas Kotte (Ed.): Theaterlexikon der Schweiz. Volume 2, Chronos, Zurich 2005, ISBN 3-0340-0715-9, p. 1167.
