= Latefa Wiersch =

German-Swiss artist

Latefa Wiersch (born 1982) is a German-Swiss visual artist. She works mostly with textile materials, creates sculptures, anthropomorphic objects, puppets, installations and performances.

== Life ==
Latefa Wiersch was born and grew up in Dortmund, West Germany. She first studied Design at the Fachhochschule Bielefeld, later Fine Arts at the Berlin University of the Arts and earned a transdisciplinary Master's degree at the University of the Arts Bern. She lives in Zürich, Switzerland.

Her work has received several awards: The "Kulturstiftung Sparkasse" scholarship in 2014; the "Wilhelm Morgner Scholarship" in 2016; the "Preis des Kantons Zürich" in 2019; and in 2020 the "Zürcher Bildhauerstipendium" and the "Werkstipendium der Stadt Zürich". She was also nominated for the "Shizuko Yoshikawa Award" 2020 and the "Swiss Art Award" 2021. In 2022 she received the Swiss Performance Price. In 2023 the Swiss Art Award.

== Work ==
In her works Latefa Wiersch uses mainly everyday materials, fabrics and creates objects and puppets from them, which are intended to make the livingness of things visible. Thus, the partly distorted physicality is emphasized. Mostly the installative works are accompanied by music, stop-motion videos or a theatrical use of light. The works are characterized by a sometimes whimsical humor. In her work Artpop-Insta the dolls appear as alter ego figures of the artist, giving insight into her fictional everyday life and also broadly addressing issues such as racism, tokenism and othering.

== Exhibitions ==
Selection:

- Apropos Hodler Kunsthaus Zürich, group exhibition, 2024.
- Original Features Kunsthaus Langenthal, solo exhibition, 2022.
- Neon Bush Girl Society. Schauspiel Dortmund, performance, 2022.
- The Puppet Show. Centre d'Art Contemporain Genève, 2022.
- Pulp. Black Future Month, Mouches Volantes Cologne, 2022.
- Exhibition. Swiss Art Awards Basel and Last Tango Zürich, 2021.
- Monsterhood Part II, Sennentuntschi, a cultural appropriation. Schauspiel Dortmund, performance, 2021.
- Ne Pas De Deux. Zentrum Paul Klee, performance together with Emma Murray, 2019.
- Artpop_Insta. Media art, ongoing series of works. Since 2018.
- Road Trip. Museum Wilhelm Morgner, Soest, solo exhibition, 2018.
- Pinocchio’s Wood and Four Other Lies. Kunstverein Unna, solo exhibition, 2016.
- Peepshow baggage claim. Kunsthaus Glarus, solo exhibition, 2015.
- The Creation of Man. Centre for International Light Art Unna, solo exhibition, 2014.
