= Lüthi und Blanc =

- Created by: Katja Früh
- Theme music composer: Martin Schenkel featuring Tamy
- Opening theme: Wenn immer
- Country of origin: Switzerland
- Original language: Swiss German / French
- No. of seasons: 8
- No. of episodes: 288

Production
- Running time: 25 minutes

Original release
- Network: Schweizer Radio und Fernsehen SRF
- Release: 1999 – 2007

Lüthi und Blanc is a Swiss German language television drama serial (soap opera) of the 1990s and 2000s. It was filmed and produced at locations in Switzerland by Schweizer Radio und Fernsehen SRF.

== Cast and characters (inclompete) ==
Actress/Actor	Role	Episodes	Year
Hans Heinz Moser († 2017)	Jean-Jacques Blanc	1–288	1999–2006
Linda Geiser	Johanna Blanc	1–288	1999–2006
Isabelle von Siebenthal	Catherine Lüthi, geb. Blanc	1–288	1999–2006
Hans Schenker	Martin Lüthi	1–288	1999–2006
Benjamin Fueter	Thomas Lüthi	1–288	1999–2006
Stefanie Stämpfli	Julia Lüthi	1–158, 196, 259–288	1999–2004, 2006
Viola Tami	Lotta Waser	1–288	1999–2006
Tonia Maria Zindel	Maja Lüthi	1–288	1999–2006
Martin Schenkel († 2003)	Steve Meier #1	1–140	1999–2003
Noel Wigger	Pascal Lüthi	1–218	1999–2005
Renate Steiger	Lilian Lüthi	1–288	1999–2006
Esther Gemsch	Lisbeth Rohner	1–288	1999–2006
Hanspeter Müller-Drossaart	Hanspeter Rohner †	1–45, 287	1999–2000, 2006
Beat Schlatter	Willi Huber	1–288	1999–2006
Graziella Rossi	Abusinda	1–288	1999–2006
Gilles Tschudi	Michael Frick	2–288	1999–2006
Monica Budde	Madame Delley	2–288 (durchgehend)	1999–2006
René Vuilleumier	Pierre	2–217 (durchgehend)	1999–2005
Anja Margoni	Natalie Rohner	3–120, 184–223, 281–288	1999–2002, 2005–2006
Jessica Früh	Dorothée Hurni-Frick	3–288	1999–2006
Yor Milano	Franco Moretti	4–117	1999–2003
Patrick Frey	Kurt Schwarz	5–288	1999–2006
Bernhard Michel	Lukas "Lucky" Schmid †	6–66	1999–2001
René Schoenenberger	Ulrich Rohner	9–47, 86–102, 152–244, 280–287	1999–2006
Dorothee Reize	Angelika	9–47	1999–2000
Anne-Laure Luisoni	Madame Fonjallaz	11–148 (durchgehend), 287	1999–2004, 2006
Ludwig Boettger	Albert Fink	21–288	1999–2006
Ettore Cella († 2004)	Lukas Wälti-Kern †	27–86	2000–2001
Sibylle Courvoisier († 2003)	Letti Merian	31–172 (durchgehend)	2000–2003
Hanna Scheuring	Jeanine Wälti-Kern	32–118	2000–2002
Alfred Pfeiffer	Schmuklerski	33, 50–67	2000–2001
Joris Gratwohl	Maurizio Galfatti	37–108	2000–2002
Katharina von Bock	Sabina Köster	49–288	2000–2006
Tessie Tellmann	Ursula Schmid	50–105, 159–288	2000–2002, 2004–2006
Jodoc Seidel	Josef †	59–90	2000–2001
Klaus-Henner Russius	Dr. Honecker	66–68, 253–262	2000, 2006
Andreas Krämer	Geri	72–140	2001–2003
Jean-Pierre Cornu	Dr. Tobler	72–154	2001–2004
Regula Stüssi	Sekretärin Kuster	76–283	2001–2006
Raphael Clamer	Alex Weiss	77–120, 164–264	2001–2006
Bernard Michel	Daniel Schmid	84–158	2001–2004
Anne-Marie Blanc († 2009)	Esther Weiss	91–116, 177, 219	2001–2002, 2004–2005
Andrea Marin	Margrith "Angelique" Müller	94–126, 151–153, 247	2001–2005
César Keiser († 2007)	Alfred Bernasconi	94–147	2001–2003
Roland Herrman	Paul Nyffenegger	96–133, 168–179, 211–216	2001–2005
Tiziana Burkart	Tamara Müller	104–288	2002–2006
Manuel Löwensberg	Urs Wicky	112–128, 153–200, 221–288	2002–2006
Mathias Gnädinger († 2015)	Ruedi Egger	120–288	2003–2006
Birgit Steinegger	Doris Ruf	141–203, 275–278	2004–2006
Roeland Wiesnekker	Steve Meier #2	143–288	2003–2006
Anikó Donáth	Doris Hummer	160, 264–287	2004, 2006
Walter Andreas Müller	Bela Straub	163–219	2004–2005
Jörg Schneider († 2015)	Oskar Wehrli	169–288	2004–2006
Sabina Schneebeli	Regula Imboden †	175–263	2004–2006
Helmut Vogel	Rainer Sanders	196–268, 281	2004–2006
Joel Basman	Zizou Imboden	199–286	2004–2006
Andreas Matti	René Imboden †	208–216, 254–263	2004, 2006

== Plot (excerpt) ==
The various plot lines are about the fate of families around the stubborn chocolate factory-owner Jean-Jacques Blanc (Hans Heinz Moser), his wife Johanna (Linda Geiser), whose daughter Catherine (Isabelle von Siebenthal) and her son, and Catherine's husband Martin Lüthi (Hans Schenker). Opponent of the Lüthi and Blanc-clans and "villain" of the series is the opaque, scheming bankers and illegitimate son of J.J. Blanc, Michael Frick (Gilles Tschudi). The serial focusses on locations in Zürich and Sainte-Croix, the location of the fictional chocolate factory J. J. Blanc.

In addition to the places where the characters live and work, the locations include the "Calvados Bar" in Zurich-Wiedikon, which is run by Martin Lüthi's mother Lilian (Renate Steiger) and his half-sister Maja (Tonia Maria Zindel) and her husband Steve Meier (Martin Schenkel and Roeland Wiesnekker respectively), various shared flats and a farm in the Zurich province. In addition, there are the fictional restaurants "De la Poste" in Sainte-Croix and "Balthasar" in Zurich, which serve as meeting places.

Other important characters are the widowed, scheming gossip reporter Lisbeth Rohner (Esther Gemsch), her brother-in-law, the hypocritical-seeming pastor Ulrich Rohner (René Schoenenberger); street sweeper and "Calvados" regular Willi (Beat Schlatter); the son of the Lüthi couple and young lawyer Thomas (Benjamin Fueter), his sister Julia (Stefanie Stämpfli) and Thomas' ex-girlfriend Lotta Waser (Viola Tami). The popular actor Mathias Gnädinger can be seen in the role of the farmer Ruedi Egger. The constellations of characters and settings have changed considerably in some cases during the more than 200 episodes that have been broadcast.

At the beginning, the series was conceived as a cross-language project; the series also ran in dubbed versions on the SRG stations TSR and TSI. In addition to the locations in the German and French-speaking parts of Switzerland, there was also a plot location in Ticino. This concept failed, however, and Lüthi und Blanc was continued as a purely Swiss-German project. What remained was the occasional bilingualism of the series. Although the main characters usually speak German with each other, French is often spoken in conversations with outsiders in Vaud, even in the dialect version.

The series sometimes touches on controversial topics such as open homosexuality, racism, drug abuse, prostitution, celibacy, incest or polygamy. The often very different social milieus portrayed are striking.

== Production ==
Lüthi und Blanc was shot at locations in the Canton of Vaud and in Zürich, and produced in Glattfelden.

Around 80% of the scenes were shot in a studio set up especially for the soap in Glattfelden. There were over 30 sets for the series in the former spinning mill. Among the most famous were the "Villa Blanc" and the "Calvados Bar", which exists in real life in Zurich and was recreated in a slightly modified form in the studio. The exterior views were shot all over Switzerland, for example in Estavayer-le-Lac (Villa Blanc) or Embrach (farm).

The smaller part, about 20% of all scenes, were shot "on location". The Lüthi and Blanc crew spent about four weeks a year filming in Switzerland.

The filming was not open to the public, but it was possible to visit the Glattfelden Film Studios - an opportunity taken advantage of by several thousand visitors each year.

The series was shot up to nine months in advance of broadcast. In addition, the scripts were written half a year in advance. Filming was done in so-called sub-sets, which were assigned to a director.

== Reception ==
As well as Fascht e Familie, Lüthi & Blanc is still very popular in the Swiss German culture, and from time to time re-broadcast in the Swiss German television. Lüthi and Blanc was by the Swiss media often called Schoggi Soap (chocolate soap).
