= Andreas Matti =

Swiss actor

- Born: 21 December 1959 (age 66); Saanen, Switzerland
- Occupations: Stage and film actor
- Years active: since 1975
- Notable work: Fascht e Familie (1994–1999); Lüthi und Blanc (2004–2006)

Andreas Matti (born 21 December 1959) is a Swiss stage and film actor starring usually in Swiss German language cinema, television and stage productions.

== Biography ==
Born in Saanen in Switzerland, Andreas Matti lives in the municipality of Zürich. His most popular role is the character of Rolf Aebersold in the Swiss comedy serial Fascht e Familie in the 1990s, later he was part of the Lüthi und Blanc cast and played in the Swiss television drama Sonjas Rückkehr alongside Melanie Winiger. Andreas Matti made his acting training at the Academy of Arts in Bern und was a regular guest at the Schauspielhaus Zürich and at the Theater am Neumarkt at Neumarkt, Zürich.

== Filmography (excerpt) ==
- 2013: Scale 6 (TV film)
- 2013: Tapeten
- 2013: Dinu - der Schwerkraft entgegen (TV)
- 2006: Sonjas Rückkehr
- 2004–2006: Lüthi und Blanc (19 episodes)
- 1994–1999: Fascht e Familie (18 episodes)
- 1988: Aus allem raus und mitten drin
- 2017, 2020–2022: Wilder
