= Sonjas Rückkehr =

- Written by: Dave Tucker
- Directed by: Tobias Ineichen
- Starring: Melanie Winiger
- Music by: Fabian Römer
- Country of origin: Switzerland
- Original language: Swiss German

Production
- Producers: Valentin Greutert; Simon Hesse
- Cinematography: Felix von Muralt
- Running time: 90

Original release
- Network: SRF
- Release: 30 October 2006

Sonjas Rückkehr is a 2006 Swiss Drama film produced for the Swiss television SRF.

== Plot (excerpt) ==
Sonja Knecht (Melanie Winiger) was sentenced to six years in prison for the alleged murder of her husband. Sonja travels to her hometown where the 28-year-old mother rents a room. She wants to see her son, watching him undetected in the schoolyard and learns from his mouth "my mum is dead" as the eight-year-old boy was teased by other school children because his prison mother. The further contact is initially prohibited: Tim lives with her in-law parents Armin and Julia which Sonja has entrusted her then two-year-old son. Armin forces after another contact trial by Sonja, and that she has to live in an open living group as Sonja broke the rules of probation. To obtain the legal custody of her son, Sonja contacts Stefan, the only witness of the murder night and asks him to finally admit the truth.

== Cast ==
- Melanie Winiger as Sonja
- Marlon Altenburger as Tim
- Urs Hefti as Armin Berger
- Michael Finger as Stefan
- Suly Röthlisberger as Silvia
- Renate Steiger as Elvira
- Andreas Matti as probationer Brändli
- Herbert Leiser as father of Sonja
- Oliver Zgorelec as Dejan
- Fitore Aliu as Tatjana
- Anette Wunsch as prison director
- Philippe Graber as police officer
- Hanspeter Bader as innkeeper
- Eva Lenherr as supervisor
- Anne Marie Hafner as Dora

== Reception ==
First aired at the 12e Cinéma Tout Écran – Festival international du cinéma et de télévision, Competition in Genève on 30 October 2006, Sonjas Rückkehr was presented on occasion of the 42nd Solothurn Film Festival on 22 January 2007.

The Swiss cinema magazine Cinema claimed "a touching, spirited and deeply in the Swiss Plateau mentality founded melodrama that could inspire more than 600,000 spectators on a Sunday evening".

== Production ==
Sonjas Rückkehr was filmed in April 2006 at locations in the canton of Zürich and was produced for the Swiss television SRF in Swiss German. For international use, the original title Sonjas Rückkehr may refer to Her Second Chance.

== Home media ==
The television film was released on DVD (RC 2) on 6 July 2006.

== Awards ==
- 2006: Geneva Cinéma Tout Ecran, Grand Prix for Best Swiss TV Film won Best Film for Tobias Ineichen.
