= Hanna Scheuring =

Swiss actress

- Born: 15 June 1965 (age 59); Zürich, Switzerland
- Occupation(s): Stage and film actress
- Years active: since 1983
- Notable work: Fascht e Familie (1994–1999); Lüthi und Blanc (2000–2002)

Hanna Scheuring (born 15 June 1965) is a Swiss stage and film actress starring usually in Swiss German language cinema and television and stage productions.

== Early life ==
Born near Zürich, canton of Zürich, in Switzerland, as the youngest of four daughters, Hanna Scheuring lives in the municipality of Zürich and has a teenage son and a daughter.

== Education and career ==
After training as an actress at the Conservatory of Music and Theatre in Bern, she played several years in Germany, at the State Theatre Marburg and at the Theater Trier. Hanna Scheuring's most popular role is the character of Vreni Hubacher in the Swiss comedy serial Fascht e Familie in the 1990s. Lüthi und Blanc was her next Swiss engagement, thenafter she played in various films and is still on stage. Hanna Scheuring has also worked as a trainer and coach to support people in culture and business performance skills. She has been involved for some time for UNICEF and traveled to Somalia to gather information on site about female circumcision. Scheuring is still active as a stage actress.

In October 2014 she became the director of the Bernhard-Theater Zürich. Among others, she modernized the Volkstheater program of the Bernhard-Theater, and tried to preserve the tradition of folk theater, but also to further develop it and adapt it to the changing needs of the audience. These include, for example, productions such as "Cabaret" on occasion of the theater's 75th anniversary in December 2016. The so-called "Bernhard-Matinee" is a revival of the "Bernhard-Apéro", and also the plays and productions by Erich Vock attract a wide audience.

== Filmography (excerpt) ==
- 2014: Auf Ewig Dein
- 1994–1997: Fascht e Familie (67 episodes)
- 2000–2002: Lüthi und Blanc (87 episodes)
- 1983: Die schwarze Spinne
