= Sandra Moser =

Swiss actress

- Born: 27 September 1969 (age 56); Thun, Switzerland
- Occupations: Stage and film actress and cabaretist
- Years active: since 1992
- Notable work: Fascht e Familie (1997–1999)

Sandra Moser (born 27 September 1969) is a Swiss stage and film actress starring usually in Swiss German language cinema and television and stage productions.

== Biography ==
Born in Thun in Switzerland, Sandra Moser lives in the municipality of Zürich. Educated at the Schauspielakademie Zürich, she starred at the Schauspielhaus Hannover in Brecht's Threepenny Opera in 1992. Thereafter, she toured for several years with Karls kühne Gassenschau through Switzerland and played in several plays, as she does in the present days. Sandra Moser also starred in German and Swiss television productions, conducted workshops for actors, and also worked 2006/2007 as assistant director of the Swiss television series Schöni Uussichte.

Sandra Moser's most popular role is the character of Anne Käthi Tobler in the Swiss comedy serial Fascht e Familie in the 1990s.

== Filmography ==
- 2006–2007: Schöni Uussichte (assistant director, TV series, 6 episodes)
- 1999: Das Bikini Atoll
- 1996: Boomtown Berlin (TV series)
- 1994–1997: Fascht e Familie (100 episodes)
- 1994: Eurocops (TV series)
