= Martin Schenkel =

Swiss actor and musician

- Martin Schenkel on Fascht e Familie, 1994 season 1 episode 6 Entführen geht über studieren
- Born: 25 April 1968; Basel, Switzerland
- Died: 26 March 2003 (aged 34); Zermatt, Switzerland
- Occupations: Television actor, comedian and musician
- Years active: 1994–2003
- Notable work: Fascht e Familie (1994–1999); Lüthi und Blanc (1999–2003)

Martin Schenkel (25 April 1968 – 26 March 2003) was a Swiss television actor and musician starring usually in Swiss German television productions.

== Biography ==
Martin Schenkel was born in Basel and after high school attended the University of the Arts Bern in Bern to study drama. He then moved to Germany for an engagement at the State Theater, Karlsruhe. His most popular role is the character of Flip in the Swiss comedy serial Fascht e Familie in the 1990s, where he had to break for reasons of health. Thereafter, Martin Schenkel was involved in Lüthi und Blanc from 1999 to 2003 and contributed to its theme "Whenever". He also became successful as a pop musician. Martin Schenkel died on 26 March 2003 in Zermatt after a brief illness.

== Filmography (excerpt) ==
Year	Title	Role	Notes
1994–1996	Fascht e Familie	Flip	47 episodes
1995	Unconditional Love	Ball Attendee	
1998	Fögi Is a Bastard	Ritch	
1999	Northern Skirts	Jasmin's Supervisor	
1999	Lüthi und Blanc	Steve Meier	Episode: "Der neue Schwarm"
2002	Big Deal	Robert Weber	TV movie, (final film role)
