= Bern Academy of the Arts =

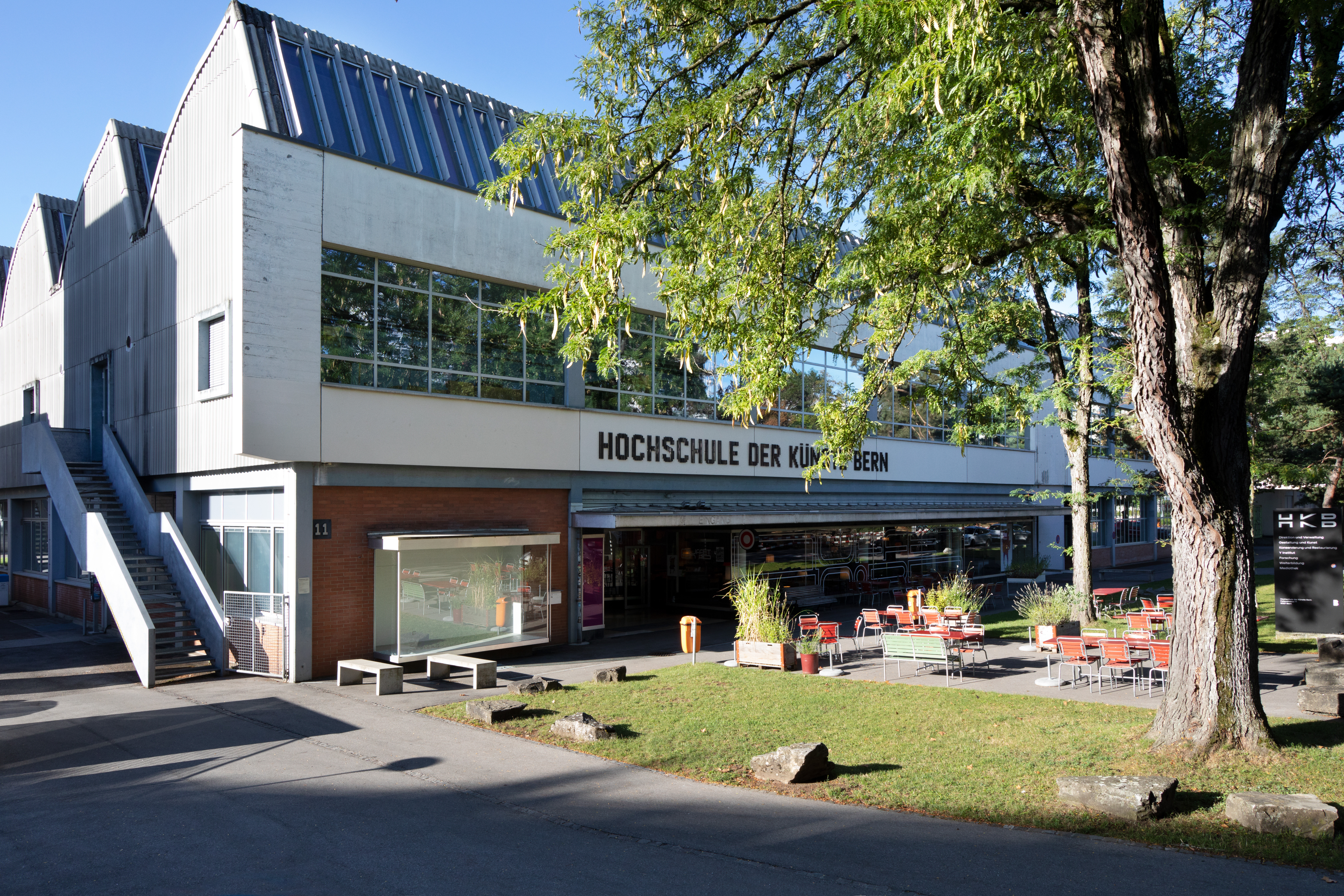
- Campus Fellerstrasse

Location
- Bern, Biel/Bienne; Switzerland
- 46°56′48″N 7°23′29″E

Information
- Type: Public
- Established: 1 September 2003
- Dean: Thomas Beck
- Enrollment: 980
- Website: Bern Academy of the Arts

The Bern Academy of the Arts (German: Hochschule der Künste Bern) is an art school with locations in Bern and Biel/Bienne. It was created in 2003 from the merger of the University of Music and Theatre and the School of Design, Art and Conservation. The educational institution is one of eight departments of the Bern University of Applied Sciences. Students and lecturers of the HKB come from over 30 countries. The HKB works in research and as an organizer according to information closely with Swiss and international partners from culture, society and economy together, enabling even large-scale projects such as the Biennale Bern. It also contributes to cultural life in Berne.

== Departments ==
Departments at the Bern Academy of the Arts include music, design and art, opera, theater, conservation and restoration, the Swiss Literature Institute and the Y Institute. It offers internationally recognized Bachelor and Master courses in these departments. Since 2006, the Swiss Literary Institute has been a part of the school. The Y Institute is a center for interdisciplinary teaching and works at the interfaces of art and science.

== Notable alumni ==
The HKB and its predecessor institutions such as the Bern Conservatory and the School for Music and Theatre Bern have trained many famous artists. These include:

- Elina Duni, Swiss-Albanian singer and composer
- Dorothee Elmiger, Swiss writer
- Linda Geiser, Swiss actress
- Rebecca Indermaur, Swiss actress
- Patricia Kopatchinskaja, Moldovan-Austrian violinist
- Stefan Kurt, Swiss actor
- Gwendolyn Masin, Dutch-Irish violinist
- Matthias Nawrat, German writer
- Andreas Reize, Swiss organist and conductor, Thomaskantor
- Maximilian Schell, Swiss actor, director, and producer
- Martin Schenkel, Swiss actor and musician
- Latefa Wiersch, German visual artist
- Luzia von Wyl, Swiss pianist and composer
- Kaspar Zehnder, Swiss conductor and flutist
