= Fascht e Familie =

- Swiss DVD cover of the season 5, published by Ex Libris
- Created by: Charles Lewinsky
- Starring: Trudi Roth; Walter Andreas Müller; Martin Schenkel; Hanna Scheuring; Andreas Matti; Sandra Moser
- Country of origin: Switzerland
- Original language: German
- No. of seasons: 5
- No. of episodes: 99+1

Production
- Running time: 25 minutes

Original release
- Network: Schweizer Radio und Fernsehen SRF
- Release: 1994 – 1999

Fascht e Familie (German: Fast eine Familie, English: almost a family) is a Swiss German language television comedy serial (sitcom) of the 1990s. It was filmed and produced at locations in Switzerland by Schweizer Radio und Fernsehen SRF.

== Plot (excerpt) ==
Real estate agent Rolf Aebersold is trying to sell his aunt Martha's (Trudi Roth) house without her knowledge, but the ad ends up in the section "Furnished rooms for rent". Nobody's fool, the tough old lady welcomes several lodgers, whose various problems are addressed by this new community, which is "almost a family". Unusual ideas result in confusion and mayhem in every episode. The main setting is the shared kitchen.

== Title ==
The series title means almost a family in Swiss German.

== Cast and characters ==
=== Martha Aebersold (Trudi Roth) ===
- Trudi Roth as Martha Aebersold (1994–1999)

Tante Martha (meaning aunty Martha) is a good-hearted, somewhat old-fashioned old lady of endearing naivety, and is the owner of the house. Esoteric issues are her special hobby, and because she is always ready to think well of everybody, she is the perpetual victim of gurus of all kinds. Her temporary obsessions usually last for just one episode and then replaced by new ones. In the short term, her special interests result in highly complicated situations – especially when her nephew, the estate agent, tries to use her latest spleen to have Martha and the new 'family' evicted from her house. Trudi Roth' attended the Ernst Ginsberg drama school in Basel, followed by performances with the cabaret-doodle-doo and Cabaret Cornichon. Later she starred in comedies and musicals, radio plays and Swiss TV productions. Trudi Roth died on the night of 11 June 2016 in a nursing home in Zürich. According to her family, cause of death was her age of 86, and dementia.

=== Hans Meier (Walter Andreas Müller) ===
- Walter Andreas Müller as Hans Meier (1994–1999)

Hans Meier (in his late forties) is a small, bustling waiter with a marked inclination to higher goals in his life, but he is good-natured. He has no doubt that he was born for the stage, and that someday someone will recognize his talent and give him the chance he needs for his 'breakthrough'. Until then, he shines as the star in amateur theatricals, where he always tries to play the lead roles. Hans, who is an excellent impersonator, takes every opportunity to take on a role, even in his private life.

Walter Andreas Müller is just as good an impersonator as Hans Meier. He worked at almost every major theatre in Switzerland, among them Bernhard-Theater Zürich, Theater am Hechtplatz and Theater an der Winkelwiese. Besides, Müller works as a freelance actor, comedian, radio host, impersonator and parodist.

=== Flip (Martin Schenkel) ===
- Martin Schenkel as Flip (1994–1998)

Flip (actually Philipp) is in his mid-twenties and a born survivor. He paints T-shirts with funny slogans and sells them on the street, always managing to earn just enough to get by with an absolute minimum of work (and keeping Martha waiting for his rent). The fact that he keeps raiding the fridge is a source of constant bickering.

Martin Schenkel was born in Basel in 1968, and attended drama school in Bern. Then he moved to Germany for an engagement at the State Theater, Karlsruhe. After "Fascht e Familie", he was in Lüthi und Blanc from 1999 to 2003, contributing the song "Whenever". He was also successful as a rock musician. Martin Schenkel died on 27 March 2003 in Zermatt after a brief illness.

=== Vreni Hubacher (Hanna Scheuring) ===
- Hanna Scheuring as Vreni Hubacher (1994–1998)

Vreni Hubacher (early twenties) is the youngest member of the "family". The brave peasant girl from the countryside came to the city and is now working at a bank. Vreni believed to be at the beginning of a great business career, and is a wannabe yuppie ready to do for promotion (almost) everything. But Vreni is so appealing that no one likes to spoil the enjoyment of her dreams.

Hanna Scheuring was born near Zürich as the youngest of four daughters. After training as an actress at the Conservatory of Music and Theatre in Bern, she played several years in Germany, at the State Theatre Marburg and at the Theater Trier. In Switzerland, she was primarily known for her role as "Vreni". "Lüthi and Blanc" was her next Swiss engagement, thenafter in various films. She is still on stage. In addition, Hanna Scheuring has also worked as a trainer and coach to support people in culture and business performance skills. She has been involved for some time for UNICEF and traveled to Somalia to gather information on site about female circumcision.

=== Rolf Aebersold (Andreas Matti) ===
- Andreas Matti as Rolf Aebersold (1994–1999)

Rolf Aebersold (aged at end of thirty) was "the man you love to hate", the nephew of Tante Martha, smart, greedy real estate trader and permanent legacy hunter, and no hypocrisy and no vulgarity is hypocritical to mean, if he just achieves his goal. Repeatedly new attempts to get his aunt's house are his further trademarks, but he fails against the new "family" of Martha who fends off his attacks.

Andreas Matti, born 1959 in Saanen, made his acting training at the Academy of Arts in Bern. He was a regular guest at the Schauspielhaus Zürich, and also starred in Lüthi und Blanc, as well in Swiss films.

=== Anne Käthi Tobler (Sandra Moser) ===
- Sandra Moser Anne Käthi Tobler (1997–1999)

Anne Käthi Tobler (somewhere in the late twenties) works as a midwife and dancer, is well tempered and extremely goodhearted, but sometimes she has a waggish sense of humour. Annekäthi joined the "family" in the third season and replaced Vreni and Flip.

Sandra Moser starred at the Schauspielhaus Hannover in Brecht's Threepenny Opera in 1992, thenafter she toured for several years with Karls kühne Gassenschau through Switzerland and played in several plays, as she does in the present days.

== Production ==
The serial was shot and produced in the canton of Thurgau in Switzerland. Guest roles had among others Jörg Schneider, Beat Marti, Ines Torelli and Stephanie Glaser. Between 1994 and 1999, in all five seasons with 99 episodes and one epilog of 25 minutes each were produced in the Swiss German language, and around 1997 synchronized in Swiss Standard German to be broadcast in the German and probably Austrian television. The production was done with an audience which had to applaude and to laugh as practiced in US sitcoms.

== Reception ==
First aired on 4 November 1994, Fascht e Familie is still very popular in the Swiss German culture, and from time to time re-broadcast in the Swiss German television. In 1997 the RTL-Group in Germany asked for an adoption for the German television, and so the dialogues were synchronized in the Swiss Standard German language, but the Swiss German oriented humour did not fit the audience's gusto in Germany, and even in Austria, and so just 40 episodes have been broadcast between January and October 1997 as Fast ’ne Familie on Super RTL.

== Awards (excerpt) ==
- 1995: Sparten-PRIX WALO for Radio/TV/Filmproduktion.

== Home media ==
The entire sitcom was released, including 99 episodes and one epilog, as the Fascht e Familie Gesamtedition collection on DVD (RC2).
