= Babett Arens =

Austrian actress and theater director

Babett Arens (born July 7, 1959, in Munich) is an Austrian actress and theater director.

== Biography ==
Babett Arens is the daughter of the acting couple Peter Arens and Margrit Ensinger. She grew up in Zurich, as her parents moved from the Münchner Kammerspiele to the Schauspielhaus Zürich. She attended the Acting Academy from 1976 to 1979 and debuted in the year of her graduation at the Basel Theater, where she remained until 1983.

Afterward, she lived in Paris for a time and joined a theater group, performing at events like the Festival d'Avignon. Returning to Switzerland, she was engaged at the Schauspielhaus Zürich from 1985 to 1986, then from 1986 to 1988 at the German Schauspielhaus in Hamburg. Following another commitment to the Schauspielhaus Zürich in 1989, Arens shifted her focus to Austria in the early 1990s, performing for about a decade at the Volkstheater Vienna, Burgtheater, and Schauspielhaus Vienna. From 2001 to 2007, she was engaged at Schauspiel Frankfurt, after which she returned to working primarily in Austria, at venues such as the Landestheater Niederösterreich, Theatersommer Haag, and the theater group Aktionstheater Ensemble.

Some of her notable stage roles include Elizabeth I in Friedrich Schiller’s Mary Stuart, the title roles in Katharina Knie by Carl Zuckmayer and Federico García Lorca’s Yerma, and Franziska in Gotthold Ephraim Lessing’s comedy Minna von Barnhelm (which she cites as her favorite role). Other roles include Claire Zachanassian in Friedrich Dürrenmatt’s The Visit and Marthe Rull in Heinrich von Kleist’s The Broken Jug. She has frequently performed in works by Elfriede Jelinek.

Since the early 2010s, Arens has also directed productions in Austria, including at the Landestheater Niederösterreich and in Vienna at the KosmosTheater, the Volkstheater, and the Theater zum Fürchten. Her staging of Maxim Gorky’s The Lower Depths at the Theater zum Fürchten earned a nomination for the Nestroy Theatre Prize for Best Off-Production. In 2016 and 2017, Arens portrayed Lady Capulet in Romeo and Juliet at the Schauspielhaus Graz.

Around 1980, Arens began working in film and television. Early roles included two episodes of the series Derrick, followed by appearances in Swiss productions, such as Markus Imboden’s film Katzendiebe and his modern adaptation of Heidi, based on Johanna Spyri’s novel. She also appeared in the historical film Sisi and two episodes of Tatort.

Babett Arens lives in Vienna. She is married to actor, voice artist, and director Florentin Groll.

== Filmography ==
- 1980: Derrick
- 1981: The Inventor
- 1983: Glut
- 1983: The Investigator – Betrayed and Sold
- 1984: Derrick – Attack from the Dark
- 1984: Ghost Stories : Ambrose Temple
- 1988: The Dollar Trap
- 1988: Room 36
- 1989: Another Wish
- 1990: The Witness
- 1993: Night of Fire
- 1994–1995: The Director (TV series)
- 1995: Vandalucia
- 1996: Cat Thieves
- 1996: In the intoxication of love
- 1997: Laura
- 1998: Lieselotte
- 1999: The New One – A Woman with Caliber
- 2000: Charming Friends
- 2001: Heidi
- 2001: Utopia Blues
- 2009: Giulia's disappearance
- 2009: Sisi
- 2010: The Big Cat
- 2011: Residual risk
- 2012: Tatort
- 2013: Couchmovie
- 2013: The Swiss
- 2014: The Circle
- 2014: Tatort – Freigang
- 2014: Victoria (short film)
- 2017: SOKO Donau
- 2022: Baden against Württemberg

== Radio Plays ==
- 1990: The Magnetite – Author: Sheila Hodgson – Director: Heinz Wilhelm Schwarz
- 2003: Klopfzeichen – Author: Gisela von Wysocki – Director: Brigitte Landes

== Awards ==
- 1990/91: Karl-Skraup Prize
- 1992: Sponsorship award for the Kainz Medal for the role of Elizabeth I
- 2012: Nomination for the Nestroy Theatre Prize for The Lower Depths

== Literature ==
- Jean Grädel: Babett Arens . In: Andreas Kotte (ed.): Theaterlexikon der Schweiz . Volume 1, Chronos, Zurich 2005, ISBN 3-0340-0715-9, p. 67
