= Hansjörg Schneider =

Swiss writer and dramatist (born 1938)

Hansjörg Schneider (born 27 March 1938) is a Swiss writer and dramatist known for occasionally using Mundart or Swiss dialect. He received the Phantastik-Preis der Stadt Wetzlar in 1998.

== Inspector Hunkeler mysteries ==
- Silberkiesel (translated as Silver Pebbles) (1993)
- Flattermann (1995)
- Das Paar im Kahn (1999)
- Tod einer Ärztin (2001)
- Hunkeler macht Sachen (translated as The Basel Killings) (2004)
- Hunkeler und der Fall Livius (translated as The Murder of Anton Livius) (2007)
- Hunkeler und die goldene Hand (2008)
- Hunkeler und die Augen des Ödipus (2010)
- Hunkelers Geheimnis (2015)
- Hunkeler in der Wildnis (2020)

== Filmography ==
- 2004: Hunkeler: Das Paar im Kahn (TV, based on Schneider's novel of 1999)
- 2008: Hunkeler macht Sachen (TV, based on Schneider's 2004 novel)
- 2012: Hunkeler und die Augen des Ödipus (TV, based on Schneider's novel of 2010)
