= Hunkeler und die Augen des Ödipus =

2012 Swiss television film

- Written by: Dominik Bernet
- Directed by: Christian von Castelberg
- Starring: Mathias Gnädinger
- Music by: Christine Aufderhaar
- Country of origin: Switzerland
- Original language: Swiss German

Production
- Producers: Markus Fischer; Bettina Alber
- Cinematography: Reinhard Schatzmann
- Editor: Dagmar Lichius
- Running time: 91 minutes

Original release
- Release: March 2012

Hunkeler und die Augen des Ödipus (lit. 'Hunkeler and the Eyes of Oedipus') is a 2012 Swiss German-language television crime film directed by Christian von Castelberg and starring Mathias Gnädinger as Kommissär Peter Hunkeler. Based on Hansjörg Schneider’s novel of the same name, it was the sixth Hunkeler film starring Gnädinger. Marie Leuenberger won the Swiss Television Film Award for Best Actress for her performance as Beate Keller at the Solothurn Film Festival in 2013.

== Synopsis ==
Retired Basel police inspector Peter Hunkeler hopes to reconnect with his long-standing interest in theatre. After a controversial premiere of Oedipus Rex at Theater Basel, director and actor Bernhard Vetter is found dead in the Rhine with his eyes removed. As Hunkeler's successor Madörin focuses on Vetter's former lover, Hunkeler begins investigating the case himself, but his instincts do not serve him as well as usual.

== Cast ==
The cast includes:

- Mathias Gnädinger as Kommissar Peter Hunkeler
- Charlotte Heinimann as Hedwig
- Marie Leuenberger as Beate Keller
- Barbara Melzl as Judith Keller
- Axel Milberg as Bernhard Vetter

== Production ==
Hunkeler und die Augen des Ödipus was the sixth Hunkeler film starring Mathias Gnädinger. The film is based on Hansjörg Schneider’s novel Hunkeler und die Augen des Ödipus. In a 2013 interview with SRF, Mathias Gnädinger said that Hansjörg Schneider had insisted on his casting as Kommissär Hunkeler. SRF described Kommissär Hunkeler as Mathias Gnädinger's most personal role.

== Reception ==
=== Awards ===
At the Solothurn Film Festival in January 2013, Marie Leuenberger won the Swiss Television Film Award for Best Actress for her performance as Beate Keller.

=== Critical response ===
Filmdienst described the film as an ambitious television crime drama and praised Mathias Gnädinger in the lead role.

== Festival screenings ==
The film premiered in March 2012. It was later screened at festivals including the Solothurn Film Festival in January 2013.
