= Zran =

Zran or ZRAN could refer to:

- Mohamed Zran (born 1959), Tunisian film director
- Zoran Corporation, former American multinational semiconductor company
