= Henning von Gierke =

German painter

- Known for: Collaborated with director Werner Herzog on a number of projects
- Notable work: Henning Von Gierke: Goldener Strom Flowing Gold, Bilder von Bildern, Der innere Schlaf
- Awards: German Film Award in Gold, Silver Bear
- Website: henningvongierke.de

Henning von Gierke (born 22 December 1947 in Karlsruhe) is a German painter, set designer, production designer and art director. He has collaborated with director Werner Herzog on a number of projects. Among his many collaborations with other film, theatre and opera directors, Gierke is most notable as a painter.

== Significant collaborations ==
=== With Werner Herzog ===
Gierke collaborated with Herzog on seven films and several operas. He was Production Designer during The Enigma of Kaspar Hauser, Nosferatu the Vampyre and Fitzcarraldo. As a Set Decorator he worked on Heart of Glass and Woyzeck, as Stage Designer on operas: Lohengrin and Giovanna d'Arco and as Costume Designer on film The Transformation of the World Into Music. Gierke shot additional still photographs on Stroszek's set. He appeared twice in Herzog's film The Transformation of the World Into Music as himself and in Herzog's TV realisation of opera Giovanna d'Arco.

== Awards ==
Von Gierke won Film Award in Gold for The Enigma of Kaspar Hauser during German Film Awards and Silver Bear for an outstanding single achievement for Nosferatu, at the 29th Berlin International Film Festival.

== Books ==
- Henning Von Gierke: Goldener Strom Flowing Gold (2009)
- Bilder von Bildern (2000)
- Der innere Schlaf (1999)

== See also ==
- List of German painters
