= Trokadero =

1981 film

- Directed by: Klaus Emmerich
- Written by: Jörg Graser
- Starring: Ludwig Hirsch
- Cinematography: Peter Gauhe
- Release date: 21 April 1981 (West Germany)
- Running time: 94 minutes
- Countries: West Germany; Austria
- Language: German

Trokadero is a 1981 West German-Austrian drama film directed by Klaus Emmerich. It was entered into the 12th Moscow International Film Festival.

== Cast ==
- Ludwig Hirsch as Theo Pichler
- Franz-Xaver Kroetz as Wendelin
- Lisi Mangold as Eva
- Werner Asam as Gastwirtssohn
- Beatrice Richter as Striptease-Tänzerin
- Oswald as Max
- Uli Steigberg as Willi
- Walter Feuchtenberg as Drucker
- Gundy Grand as Patra
- Billy Griffin as Neger
- Sieglinde Hölzle as Politesse
