= 1990 Cannes Film Festival =

- Official poster of the 43rd Cannes Film Festival, an original illustration by Castella Traquandi.
- Opening film: Dreams
- Closing film: The Comfort of Strangers
- Location: Cannes, France
- Founded: 1946
- Awards: Palme d'Or: Wild at Heart
- No. of films: 18 (In Competition)
- Festival date: 10 May 1990 – 21 May 1990
- Website: festival-cannes.com/en

Cannes Film Festival
- 1991 1989

The 43rd Cannes Film Festival took place from 10 to 21 May 1990. Italian filmmaker Bernardo Bertolucci served as jury president for the main competition.

American filmmaker David Lynch won the Palme d'Or, for the drama film Wild at Heart.

The festival opened with Dreams by Akira Kurosawa, and closed with The Comfort of Strangers by Paul Schrader.

== Juries ==
=== Main competition ===
- Bernardo Bertolucci, Italian filmmaker - Jury President
- Fanny Ardant, French actress
- Bertrand Blier, French filmmaker
- Aleksei German, Soviet filmmaker
- Françoise Giroud, French journalist
- Christopher Hampton, British author and filmmaker
- Anjelica Huston, American actress
- Mira Nair, Indian filmmaker
- Sven Nykvist, Swedish cinematographer
- Hayao Shibata, Japanese

=== Camera d'Or ===
- Christine Boisson, French actress - Jury President
- Richard Billeaud
- Caroline Huppert, French director
- Bruno Jaeggi, journalist
- Martine Jouando, film critic
- Catherine Magnan, cinephile
- Jan Svoboda, journalist
- Vecdi Sayar, cinephile

== Official selection ==
=== In Competition ===
The following feature films competed for the Palme d'Or:

English title	Original title	Director(s)	Production country
Captive of the Desert	La captive du désert	Raymond Depardon	France
Come See the Paradise		Alan Parker	United States
Cyrano de Bergerac		Jean-Paul Rappeneau	France, Hungary
Daddy Nostalgie		Bertrand Tavernier	France
The Ear	Ucho	Karel Kachyňa	Czechoslovakia
Everybody's Fine	Stanno tutti bene	Giuseppe Tornatore	Italy, France
Hidden Agenda		Ken Loach	United Kingdom
Interrogation	Przesłuchanie	Ryszard Bugajski	Poland
Ju Dou	菊豆	Zhang Yimou and Yang Fengliang	China, Japan
The King's Whore	La putain du roi	Axel Corti	France, Italy, United Kingdom
Mother	Мать	Gleb Panfilov	Soviet Union, Italy
Nouvelle Vague		Jean-Luc Godard	France, Switzerland
Rodrigo D: No Future	Rodrigo D: No futuro	Víctor Gaviria	Colombia
The Sting of Death	死の棘	Kōhei Oguri	Japan
Taxi Blues	Такси-блюз	Pavel Lungin	Soviet Union
Tilaï		Idrissa Ouédraogo	Burkina Faso, Switzerland, France, Germany, United Kingdom
White Hunter Black Heart		Clint Eastwood	United States
Wild at Heart		David Lynch	United States

=== Un Certain Regard ===
The following films were selected for the Un Certain Regard section:

English title	Original title	Director(s)	Production country
1871		Ken McMullen	United Kingdom, France
Abraham's Gold	Abrahams Gold	Jörg Graser	West Germany
The Appointed	המיועד	Daniel Wachsmann	Israel
The Best Hotel on Skid Row		Christine Choy and Renee Tajima-Peña	United States
Black Rose Is an Emblem of Sorrow, Red Rose Is an Emblem of Love	Чёрная роза — эмблема печали, красная роза — эмблема любви	Sergei Solovyov	Soviet Union
Canticle of the Stones	Le cantique des pierres	Michel Khleifi	Palestine
Le casseur de pierres		Mohamed Zran	Tunisia, France
Freeze Die Come to Life	Замри, умри, воскресни!	Vitali Kanevsky	Soviet Union
How Dark the Nights Are on the Black Sea	В городе Сочи тёмные ночи	Vasili Pichul	Soviet Union
Innisfree		José Luis Guerín	Spain
The Last Ferry	Ostatni prom	Waldemar Krzystek	Poland
Longtime Companion		Norman René	United States
Night Out		Lawrence Johnston	Australia
Pummarò		Michele Placido	Italy
The Sacrament	Het sacrament	Hugo Claus	Belgium
Secret Scandal	Scandalo segreto	Monica Vitti	Italy
Song of the Exile	客途秋恨	Ann Hui	Hong Kong, Taiwan
The Space Between the Door and the Floor		Pauline Chan	Australia
Tumultes		Bertrand Van Effenterre	France
On Tour	Turnè	Gabriele Salvatores	Italy

=== Out of Competition ===
The following films were selected to be screened out of competition:

English title	Original title	Director(s)	Production country
Artificial Paradise	Umetni raj	Karpo Godina	Yugoslavia
The Comfort of Strangers (closing film)		Paul Schrader	Italy, United Kingdom, United States
Cry-Baby		John Waters	United States
Dreams (opening film)	夢	Akira Kurosawa	Japan, United States
Korczak		Andrzej Wajda	Poland, West Germany, United Kingdom
The Little Mermaid		John Musker and Ron Clements	United States
No, or the Vain Glory of Command	Non, ou a Vã Glória de Mandar	Manoel de Oliveira	Portugal
The Plot Against Harry (1971)		Michael Roemer	United States
The Sun Also Shines at Night	Il sole anche di notte	Paolo and Vittorio Taviani	Italy, France, West Germany
The Voice of the Moon	La voce della luna	Federico Fellini	Italy

=== Short film competition ===
The following short films competed for the Short Film Palme d'Or:

- Le baiser by Pascale Ferran
- The Bedroom (De slaapkamer) by Maarten Koopman
- Jours de plaine by Réal Berard, André Leduc
- The Lunch Date by Adam Davidson
- Night Cries: A Rural Tragedy by Tracey Moffatt
- Les Pediants by Prinzgau
- Le pinceau à lèvres by Bruno Bauer Chiche
- Polvo Enamorado by Javier Lopez Izquierdo
- Portrét by Pavel Koutský
- Revestriction by Barthelemy Bompard
- To Be (Etre Ou Ne Pas Être) by John Weldon
- Yego zhena kuritsa (His wife the chicken) by Igor Kovalyov

== Parallel sections ==
=== International Critics' Week ===
The following films were screened for the 29th International Critics' Week (29e Semaine de la Critique):

Feature film competition

- Beyond the Ocean by Ben Gazzara (Italy)
- H-2 Worker by Stéphanie Black (United States)
- Mes cinémas by Füruzan et Gülsün Karamustafa (Turkey)
- Overseas (Outremer) by Brigitte Roüan (France)
- Queen of Temple Street by Lawrence Ah Mon (Hong Kong)
- The Reflecting Skin by Philip Ridley (United Kingdom)
- Time of the Servants by Irena Pavlaskova (Czechoslovakia)

Short film competition

- Animathon by Collectif (Canada)
- Inoi by Sergey Masloboyshchikov (Soviet Union)
- Les Mains au dos by Patricia Valeix (France)
- The Mario Lanza Story by John Martins-Manteiga (Canada)
- Pièce touchée by Martin Arnold (Austria)
- Sibidou by Jean-Claude Bandé (Burkina Faso)
- Sostuneto by Eduardo Lamora (Norway)

=== Directors' Fortnight ===
The following films were screened for the 1990 Directors' Fortnight (Quinzaine des Réalizateurs):

- Alexandria Again and Forever (Iskindiriah Kaman Oue Kaman) by Youssef Chahine
- Bagh Bahadur by Buddhadeb Dasgupta
- Céllövölde by Arpad Sopsits
- December Bride by Thaddeus O'Sullivan
- End Of The Night by Keith McNally
- Halfaouine Child of the Terraces by Ferid Boughedir
- Inimene, Keda Polnud by Peeter Simm
- Laguerat by Georgi Djulgerov
- Margarit i Margarita by Nikolay Volev
- Metropolitan by Whit Stillman
- Paper Mask by Christopher Morahan
- Pervii Etage by Igor Minayev
- Open Doors (Porte Aperte) by Gianni Amelio
- Printemps Perdu by Alain Mazars
- Shimaguni Konjo by Fumiki Watanabe
- The Guardian Angel (Skyddsängeln) by Suzanne Osten
- Stille Betrüger by Beat Lottaz
- Swan Lake: The Zone (Lebedyne ozero. Zona) by Yuri Ilyenko
- To Sleep with Anger by Charles Burnett
- Time of Miracles (Vreme čuda) by Goran Paskaljevic
- Warsaw Bridge (Pont de Varsòvia) by Pere Portabella

== Official Awards ==
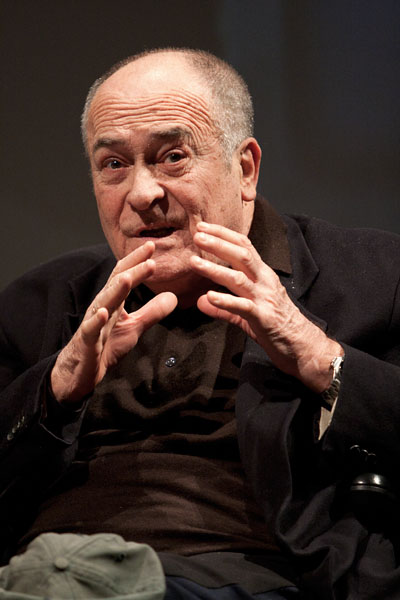
Bernardo Bertolucci, Jury President of the Main competition

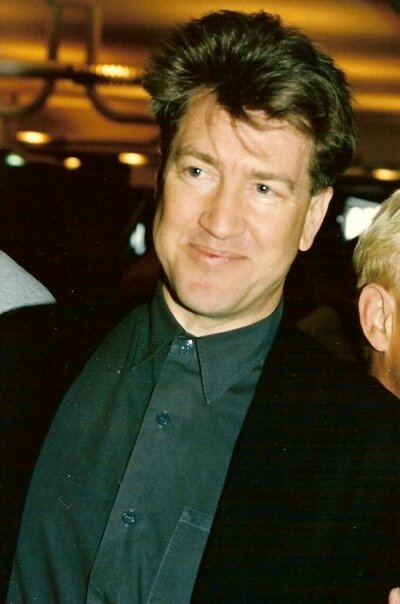
David Lynch, 1990 Palme d'Or winner

=== In Competition ===
- Palme d'Or: Wild at Heart by David Lynch
- Grand Prix:
  - The Sting of Death by Kōhei Oguri
  - Tilaï by Idrissa Ouédraogo
- Best Director: Pavel Lungin for Taxi Blues
- Best Actress: Krystyna Janda for Interrogation
- Best Actor: Gérard Depardieu for Cyrano de Bergerac
- Best Artistic Contribution: Gleb Panfilov for Mother
- Jury Prize: Hidden Agenda by Ken Loach

=== Caméra d'Or ===
- Freeze Die Come to Life by Vitali Kanevsky
  - Special Mention:
    - Time of the Servants by Irena Pavlásková
    - Farendj by Sabine Prenczina

=== Short Film Palme d'Or ===
- The Lunch Date by Adam Davidson
- First Prize of the Jury: The Bedroom by Maarten Koopman
- Second Prize of the Jury: Revestriction by Barthelemy Bompard

== Independent Awards ==
=== FIPRESCI Prizes ===
- Swan Lake: The Zone by Yuri Ilyenko (Directors' Fortnight)
- The Sting of Death by Kōhei Oguri (In competition)
- Special Award: Manoel de Oliveira

=== Commission Supérieure Technique ===
- Technical Grand Prize: Pierre Lhomme (cinematography) in Cyrano de Bergerac

=== Prize of the Ecumenical Jury ===
- Everybody's Fine by Giuseppe Tornatore
  - Special Mention:
    - Hidden Agenda by Ken Loach
    - Taxi Blues by Pavel Lungin

=== Award of the Youth ===
- Foreign Film: Swan Lake: The Zone by Yuri Ilyenko
- French Film: Printemps perdu by Alain Mazars

=== International Critics' Week ===
- Prix de la Critique Internationale: The Sting of Death by Kōhei Oguri
- Audience Award:
  - Abraham's Gold by Jörg Graser
  - Sur by Fernando Solanas

== Media ==
- INA: Arrival of the stars for the opening of the 1990 Cannes Festival (commentary in French)
- INA: Presentation of the jury of the 43rd Festival (commentary in French)
