= Winterborn (film) =

1978 film

- Directed by: Astrid Henning-Jensen
- Written by: Astrid Henning-Jensen; Dea Trier Mørch
- Produced by: Just Betzer
- Starring: Ann-Mari Max Hansen
- Cinematography: Lasse Björne
- Edited by: Astrid Henning-Jensen
- Release date: 1 September 1978
- Running time: 100 minutes
- Country: Denmark
- Language: Danish

Winterborn (Danish: Vinterbørn) is a 1978 Danish drama film directed by Astrid Henning-Jensen. It was entered into the 29th Berlin International Film Festival where Henning-Jensen won the Silver Bear for Best Director.

== Cast ==
- Ann-Mari Max Hansen - Marie
- Helle Hertz - Signe
- Lone Kellerman - Olivia
- Lea Risum Brøgger - Linda
- Berrit Kvorning - Gertrud
- Birgit Conradi - Karen Margarethe
- Mimi Vang Olsen - Habiba
- Merete Axelberg - Veronica
- Lene Brøndum - Tenna
- Ulla Gottlieb - Yvonne
- Jannie Faurschou - Connie
- Susanne Breuning - Eva - Maries søster
- Else Benedikte Madsen - Fru Holm
- Johannes Rosing - Zacharias - Maries kæreste
- Waage Sandø - Jacob - Signes mand
- Benny Poulsen
- Kurt Ravn
- Beatrice Palner
- Kjeld Nørgaard
- Jesper Christensen
- Ole Thestrup
- Elin Reimer
- Henning Palner
