= Klaus Emmerich (director) =

German film director (1943–2026)

- Born: 10 August 1943; Freital, Gau Saxony, Germany
- Died: 27 May 2026 (aged 82)
- Occupations: Film director, screenwriter
- Years active: 1971–2003

Klaus Emmerich (10 August 1943 – 20 May 2026) was a German film director and screenwriter. His 1979 film The First Polka was entered into the 29th Berlin International Film Festival, and his 1981 film Trokadero was entered into the 12th Moscow International Film Festival. He died on 20 May 2026, at the age of 82.

== Selected filmography ==
- Florian (1973, TV film)
- Heiratskandidaten (1975, TV film) – (based on a play by Gabriele Wohmann)
- Erziehung durch Dienstmädchen (1975, TV film) – (based on a novel by Robert Wolfgang Schnell)
- Kreutzer (1977)
- Heinrich Heine (1978, TV film) – (biographical film about Heinrich Heine)
- The First Polka (1979) – (based on a novel by Horst Bienek)
- Trokadero (1981) – (screenplay by Jörg Graser)
- Rote Erde (1983, TV miniseries) – (screenplay by Peter Stripp)
- Tatort: Freunde (1986, TV series episode)
- Reporter (1989, TV series)
- Mission Eureka (1989, TV miniseries)
- Rote Erde, second season (1990, TV miniseries) – (screenplay by Peter Stripp)
- Pizza Colonia (1991) – (screenplay by Bernd Schroeder)
