= Le casseur de pierres =

1989 film

- Directed by: Mohamed Zran
- Written by: Mohamed Zran
- Starring: Abdallah Maymoun
- Cinematography: Jean Claude Cotti
- Edited by: Hedi Metat
- Release date: 1989
- Countries: Tunisia; France
- Language: French

Le casseur de pierres is a 1989 Tunisian short drama film directed by Mohamed Zran. It was screened in the Un Certain Regard section at the 1990 Cannes Film Festival.

== Cast ==
- Abdallah Maymoun - Sabeur
- Monia Tkitik - Monia
- Fatha Mahdoui - Fatima
- Moufida Zran - Scheherezade
