= Nosferatu the Vampyre =

1979 film by Werner Herzog

- Theatrical release poster
- Directed by: Werner Herzog
- Screenplay by: Werner Herzog
- Based on: Dracula by Bram Stoker; Nosferatu by F. W. Murnau
- Produced by: Michael Gruskoff; Walter Saxer; Werner Herzog
- Starring: Klaus Kinski; Isabelle Adjani; Bruno Ganz
- Cinematography: Jörg Schmidt-Reitwein
- Edited by: Beate Mainka-Jellinghaus
- Music by: Popol Vuh
- Production companies: Werner Herzog Filmproduktion; Gaumont; Zweites Deutsches Fernsehen
- Distributed by: 20th Century Fox (Germany); Gaumont Distribution (France)
- Release dates: 17 January 1979 (France); 12 April 1979 (Wiesbaden)
- Running time: 107 minutes
- Countries: West Germany; France
- Languages: German; English; Romany
- Budget: DEM2.5 million; $1.4 million
- Box office: $1.0 million (domestic rentals)

Nosferatu the Vampyre (German: Nosferatu: Phantom der Nacht, lit. 'Nosferatu: Phantom of the Night') is a 1979 gothic horror film written and directed by Werner Herzog. The film serves as both a remake (Note: Several outlets identify the film as a remake. However, Herzog does not consider his version to be a remake but rather a homage or "free version" of the 1922 film.) of the 1922 film Nosferatu and an adaptation of Bram Stoker's 1897 novel Dracula. (Note: The 1922 film was an unauthorized adaptation of Stoker's novel and changes were made (such as character names) as a result. However, Herzog's film restores the characters’ names since Stoker’s novel became public domain.) Herzog's film is set in 19th-century Wismar, Germany, and Transylvania. The picture stars Klaus Kinski as Count Dracula, Isabelle Adjani as Lucy Harker, Bruno Ganz as Jonathan Harker, and French artist-writer Roland Topor as Renfield. There are two different versions of the film, one in which the actors speak English, and one in which they speak German.

Herzog's production of Nosferatu was very well received by critics and enjoyed a comfortable degree of commercial success. The film also marks the second of five collaborations between director Herzog and actor Kinski, following 1972's Aguirre, the Wrath of God. The film had one million admissions in West Germany and grossed ITL 53,870,000 in Italy. It was also a modest success in Adjani's home country, taking in 933,533 admissions in France.

A novelization of the screenplay was written by Paul Monette and published by both Avon Publishing and Picador in 1979. The 1988 Italian horror film Nosferatu in Venice is a "sequel-in-name-only", again featuring Kinski in the title role.

== Plot ==
In 1850, Jonathan Harker is an estate agent in Wismar, Germany. His employer, Renfield, tasks him to visit Count Dracula, who wishes to buy a property in the town. Leaving his wife Lucy behind, Harker travels to Transylvania. En route, he stops at an inn, where the locals beg for him to stay away from the accursed castle. Ignoring the villagers' pleas, Harker continues his journey and arrives at Dracula's castle, where he meets the Count, a man with large ears, pale skin, sharp teeth, and long fingernails.

The Count is enchanted by a small portrait of Lucy and agrees to purchase the Wismar property. As Jonathan's visit progresses, he is haunted at night by several encounters with Dracula. In Wismar, Lucy is tormented by nightmares, plagued by images of impending doom. Meanwhile, Renfield is committed to an asylum, having apparently gone insane and bitten a cow. To Harker's horror, he finds the Count asleep in a coffin, confirming to him that Dracula is indeed a vampire. That night, Dracula leaves for Wismar, taking coffins filled with the cursed earth that he needs for his vampiric rest. Harker finds himself imprisoned in the castle and attempts to escape through a window, severely injuring himself in the process. Taken to a hospital, he becomes increasingly ill.

Dracula travels with his coffins by ship to Wismar, systematically killing the ship's crew during the voyage. Death spreads throughout the town on the ship's arrival, which the local doctors, including Abraham Van Helsing, attribute to a plague caused by the rats from the ship, which begin swarming through the streets. The ailing Jonathan is transported home, but does not appear to recognize Lucy and says the sunlight is hurting him. That night, Dracula visits Lucy. Weary and unable to die, he demands some of the love that she gives to Jonathan, to no avail.

Now certain that something other than plague is responsible for the deaths, Lucy tries to convince the townspeople, who are skeptical and uninterested as they engage in a danse macabre and have a last supper. From a book given to Jonathan by the Transylvanians, Lucy discovers she can defeat Dracula by distracting him until dawn, at which time the rays of the sun will destroy him, but only at the cost of her own life. Jonathan's illness grows worse as his memory worsens and his skin turns pale. Dracula sends Renfield, who has escaped from the asylum, north to Riga as the forerunner for an outbreak of the Black Death.

Lucy spreads crumbled, consecrated Hosts in Dracula's coffins and around Jonathan and the chair he is sitting in. That night, she lures Dracula to her bedroom, where he drinks her blood. She distracts Dracula from the call of the rooster, and at the first light of day he dies. Van Helsing arrives to discover Lucy dead but victorious. He then drives a stake through the heart of Dracula to make sure that Lucy's sacrifice was not in vain. Awakening from his sickness, Jonathan has Van Helsing arrested for Dracula's murder. Getting a maid to sweep away the crumbled Host from around his chair, Jonathan, now a vampire, then states that he has much to do and rides away on horseback, garbed in the same fluttering black as Dracula.

== Cast ==
- Klaus Kinski as Count Dracula
- Isabelle Adjani as Lucy Harker (voiced by Constanze Engelbrecht)
- Bruno Ganz as Jonathan Harker
- Roland Topor as Renfield (voiced by Horst Sachtleben)
- Walter Ladengast as Dr. Abraham van Helsing
- Dan van Husen as Warden
- Jan Groth as Harbormaster
- Carsten Bodinus as Schrader
- Martje Grohmann as Mina
- Rijk de Gooyer as Town official (voiced by Fred Maire)
- Clemens Scheitz as Clerk
- John Leddy as Coachman (voiced by Norbert Gastell)
- Tim Beekman as Coffin bearer
- Margiet van Hartingsveld as Woman
- Lo van Hensbergen as Town official's assistant (voiced by Norbert Gastell)

== Production ==
=== Background ===
While the basic story is derived from Bram Stoker's novel Dracula, director Herzog made the 1979 film primarily as a homage remake of F. W. Murnau's silent film Nosferatu (1922), which differs somewhat from Stoker's original work. The makers of the earlier film changed several minor details and character names. They also did not have permission to use the intellectual property of the novel, which was owned (at the time) by Stoker's widow Florence. A lawsuit was filed, resulting in an order for the destruction of all prints of the film. Some prints survived and were restored after Florence Stoker had died and the copyright had expired. By the 1960s and early 1970s, the original silent returned to circulation, and was enjoyed by a new generation of moviegoers.

Herzog considered Murnau's Nosferatu to be the greatest film ever to come out of Germany, and was eager to make his own version of the film, with Klaus Kinski in the leading role. Herzog also conceived the film as a means of reconnecting the New German Cinema with the tradition of German filmmaking that had preceded the Nazi era. During production, he said that his aim in revisiting Nosferatu was to create a "bridge" between the Expressionist cinema associated with filmmakers such as Murnau and the postwar resurgence of German film. By 1979, Dracula had entered the public domain, so Herzog opted to include the original character names.

Herzog saw his film as a parable about the fragility of order in a staid, bourgeois town. "It is more than a horror film," he says. "Nosferatu is not a monster, but an ambivalent, masterful force of change. When the plague threatens, people throw their property into the streets; they discard their bourgeois trappings. A re‐evaluation of life and its meaning takes place." Adjani said about her heroine: "There's a sexual element. She is gradually attracted towards Nosferatu. She feels a fascination — as we all would think. First, she hopes to save the people of the town by sacrificing herself. But then, there is a moment of transition. There is a scene when he is sucking her blood — sucking and sucking like an animal—and suddenly, her face takes on a new expression, a sexual one, and she will not let him go away anymore. There is a desire that has been born. A moment like this has never been seen in a vampire picture". According to Kinski: "We see Dracula sympathetically [in this film]. He is a man without free will. He cannot choose, and he cannot cease to be. He is a kind of incarnation of evil, but he is also a man who is suffering, suffering for love. This makes it so much more dramatic, more double‐edged."

=== Filming ===
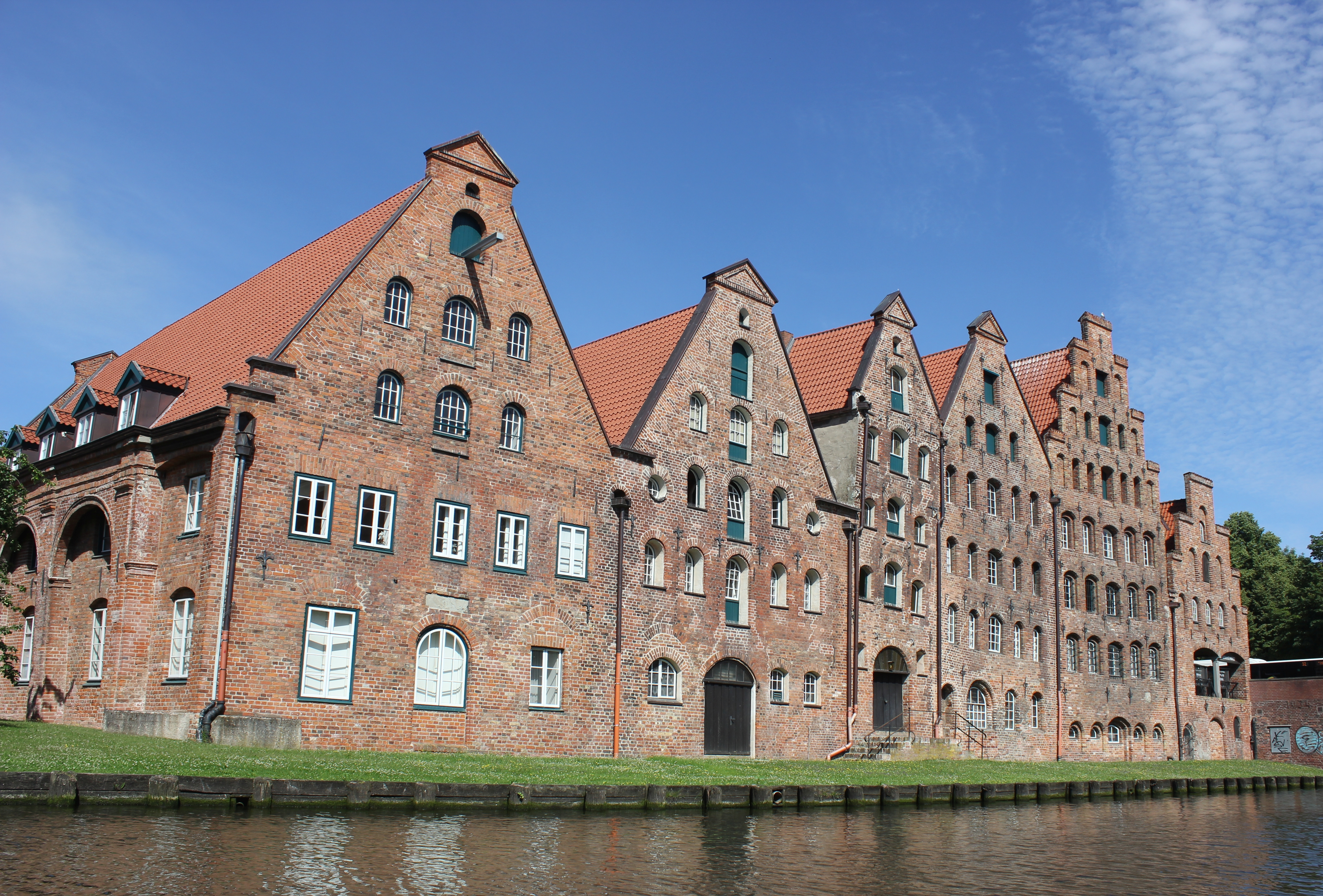
Lübeck Salzspeicher as Dracula's new property in Wismar

Nosferatu the Vampyre was co-produced by Werner Herzog Filmproduktion, French film company Gaumont, and West German public-service television station ZDF. As was common for West German films during the 1970s, Nosferatu the Vampyre was filmed on a minimal budget and with a crew of just 16 people. Herzog could not film in Wismar, where the original Murnau film was shot, so he relocated production to Delft, Netherlands. Parts of the film were shot in nearby Schiedam, after the Delft authorities refused to allow Herzog to release 11,000 rats for a scene in the film.

The sequences set in Transylvania were filmed in Czechoslovakia, including locations in Moravia and the High Tatras. Pernštejn Castle was used to represent Dracula's castle. Herzog had originally intended to film in Romania, but abandoned the plan after local filmmakers warned him that permission would not be granted under Nicolae Ceaușescu's government. Herzog later clarified that he had never received a formal refusal from the Romanian authorities, but had been advised to leave the country rather than wait for permission.

At the request of distributor 20th Century Fox, Herzog produced two versions of the film simultaneously to appeal to English-speaking audiences. Most of the scenes with dialogue were filmed twice, once in German and again in English, although a few scenes were shot once with dubbing used as needed. In 2014, Herzog called the English version "great", but the German version the "more authentic" version of the two.

Herzog himself filmed the opening sequence at the Mummies of Guanajuato museum in Guanajuato, Mexico, where a large number of naturally mummified bodies of the victims of an 1833 cholera epidemic are on public display. Herzog had first seen the Guanajuato mummies while visiting in the 1960s. On his return in the 1970s, he took the corpses out of the glass cases where they were normally stored. He propped them against a wall to film them, arranging them in a sequence running roughly from childhood to old age.

Klaus Kinski's appearance as Dracula, including his bald head, pointed ears, rat-like teeth and elongated fingernails, was modelled on Max Schreck's portrayal of Count Orlok in F. W. Murnau's Nosferatu (1922). The makeup was applied by Japanese artist Reiko Kruk, with the process taking approximately four hours each day. Herzog recalled that Kinski, despite his reputation for outbursts on set, was remarkably patient during the makeup sessions and enjoyed working with Kruk. Several shots in the movie are faithful recreations of iconic images from Murnau's original film, some almost perfectly identical to their counterparts, intended as homages to Murnau.

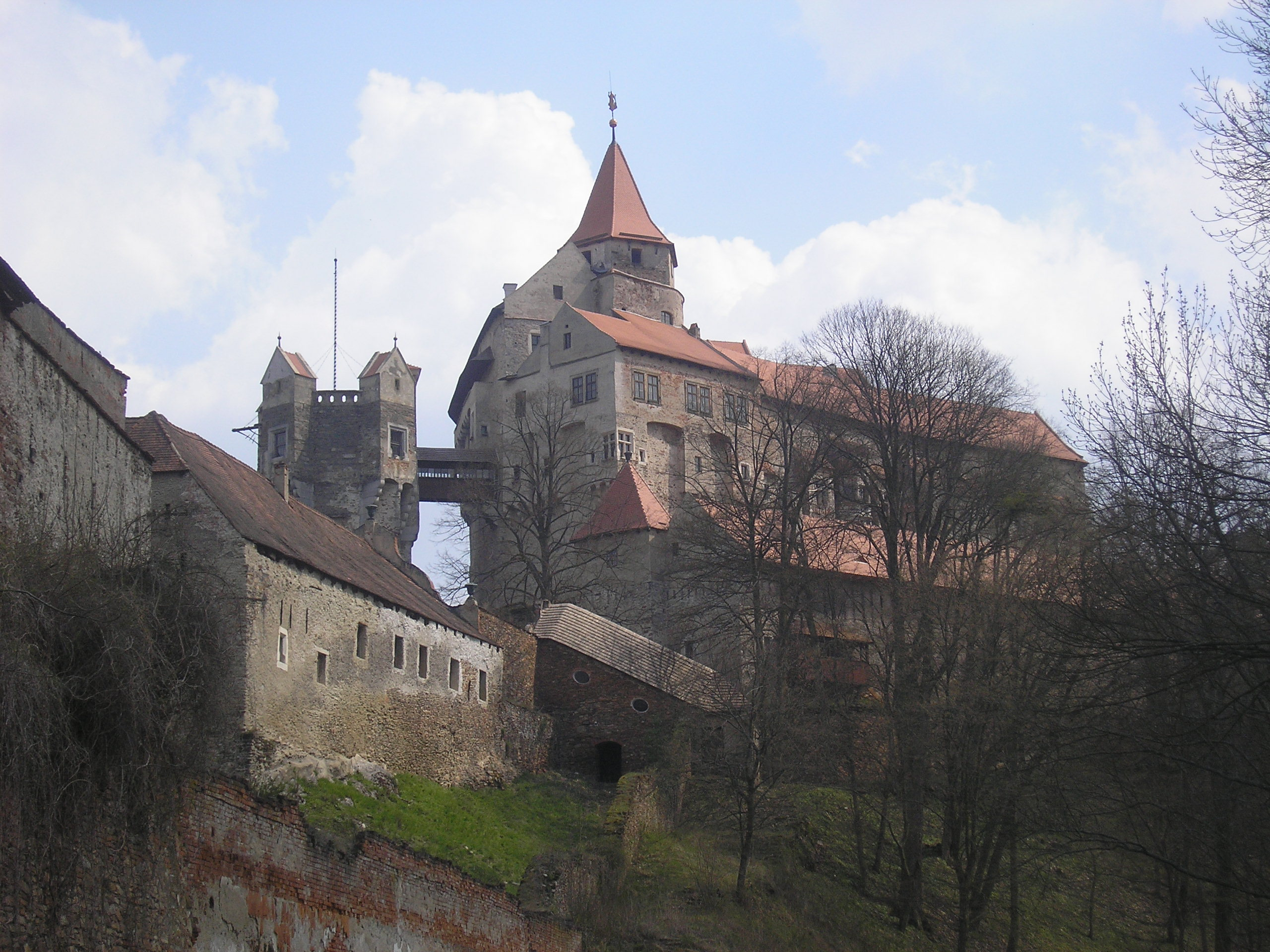
Pernštejn Castle as Drakula's home

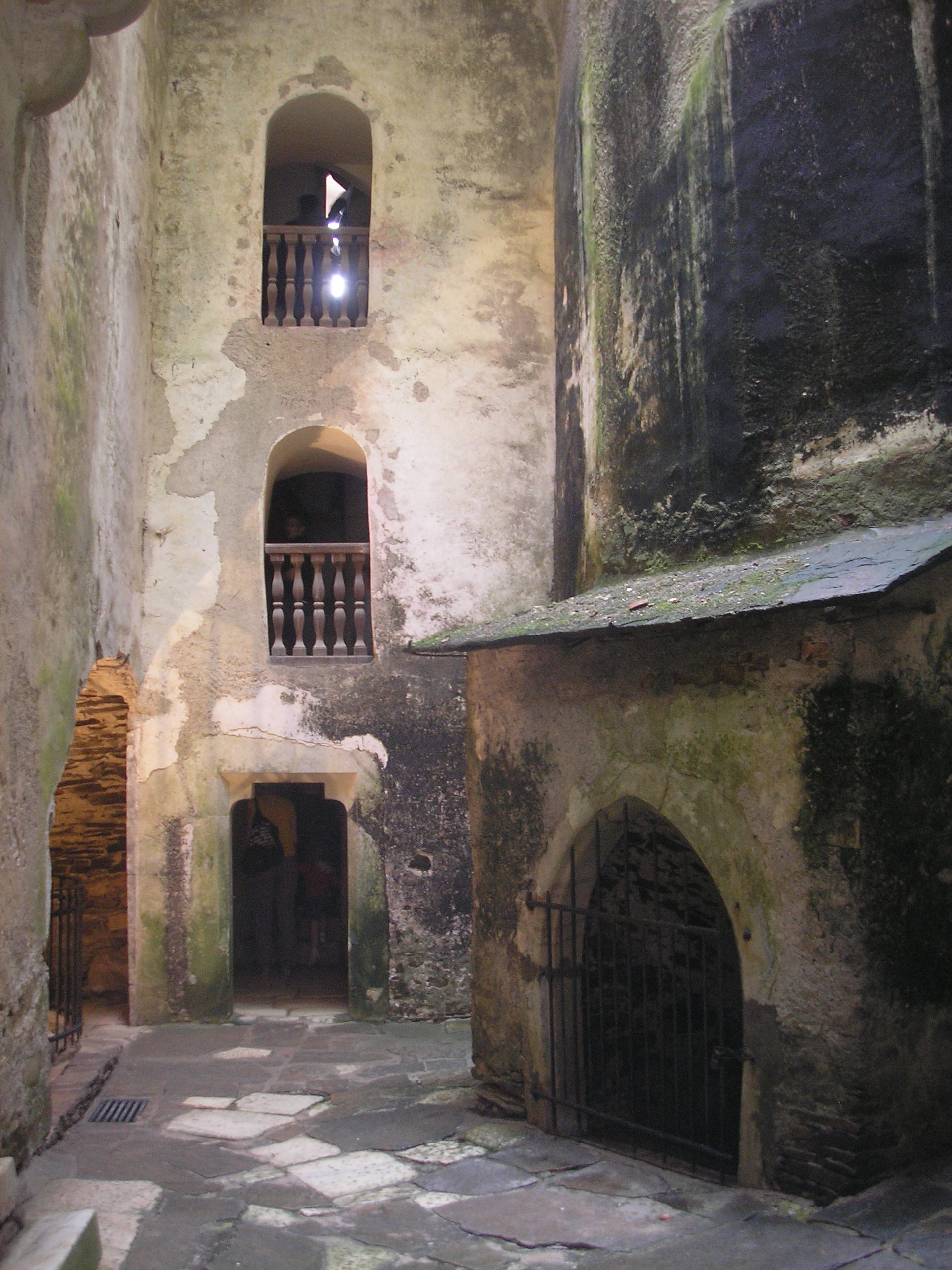
Inner ward of Pernštejn Castle with the entrance to Dracula's crypt in the movie on the right

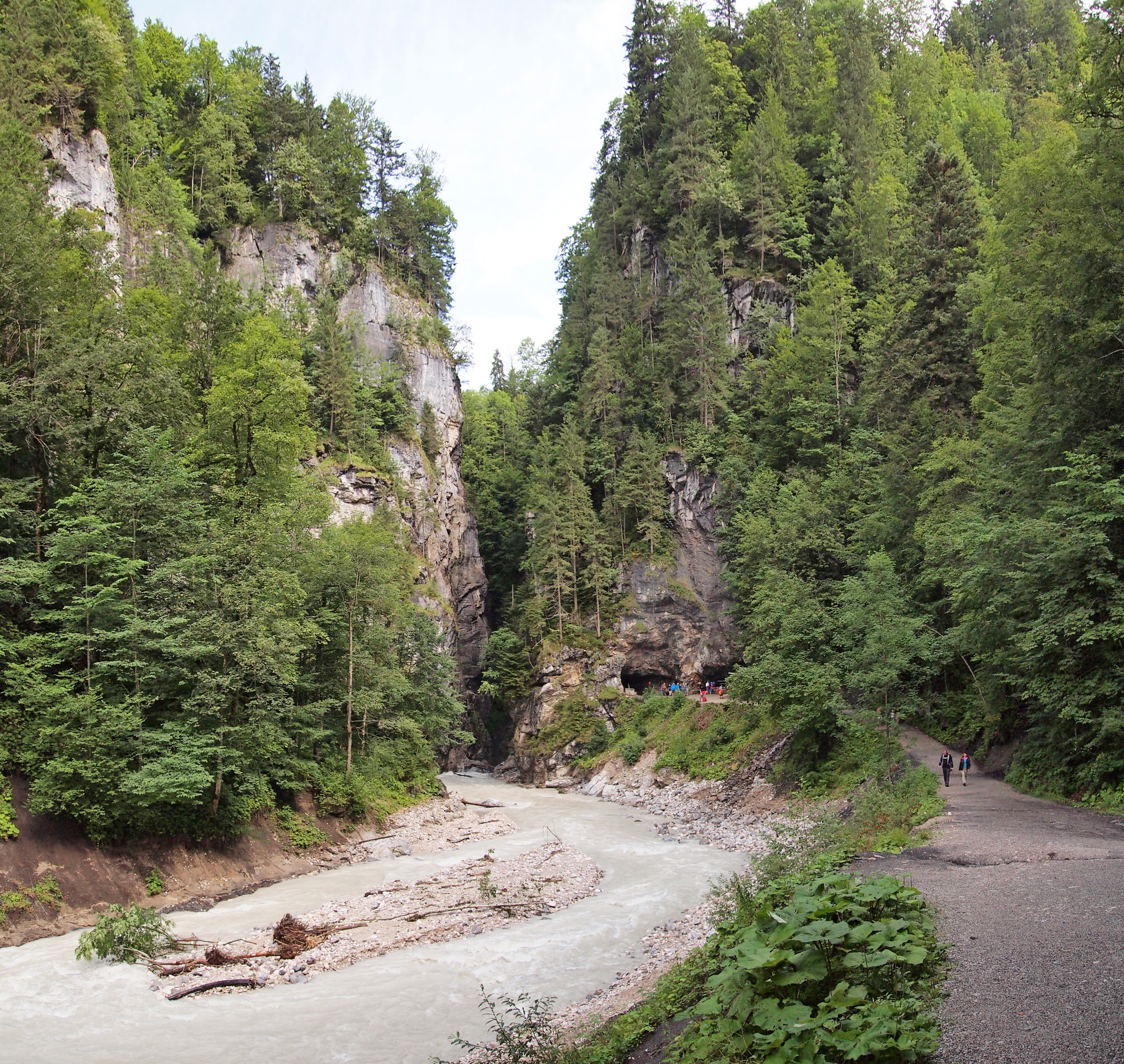
Partnach river near Garmisch-Partenkirchen, at which Harker's journey to Transylvania was filmed

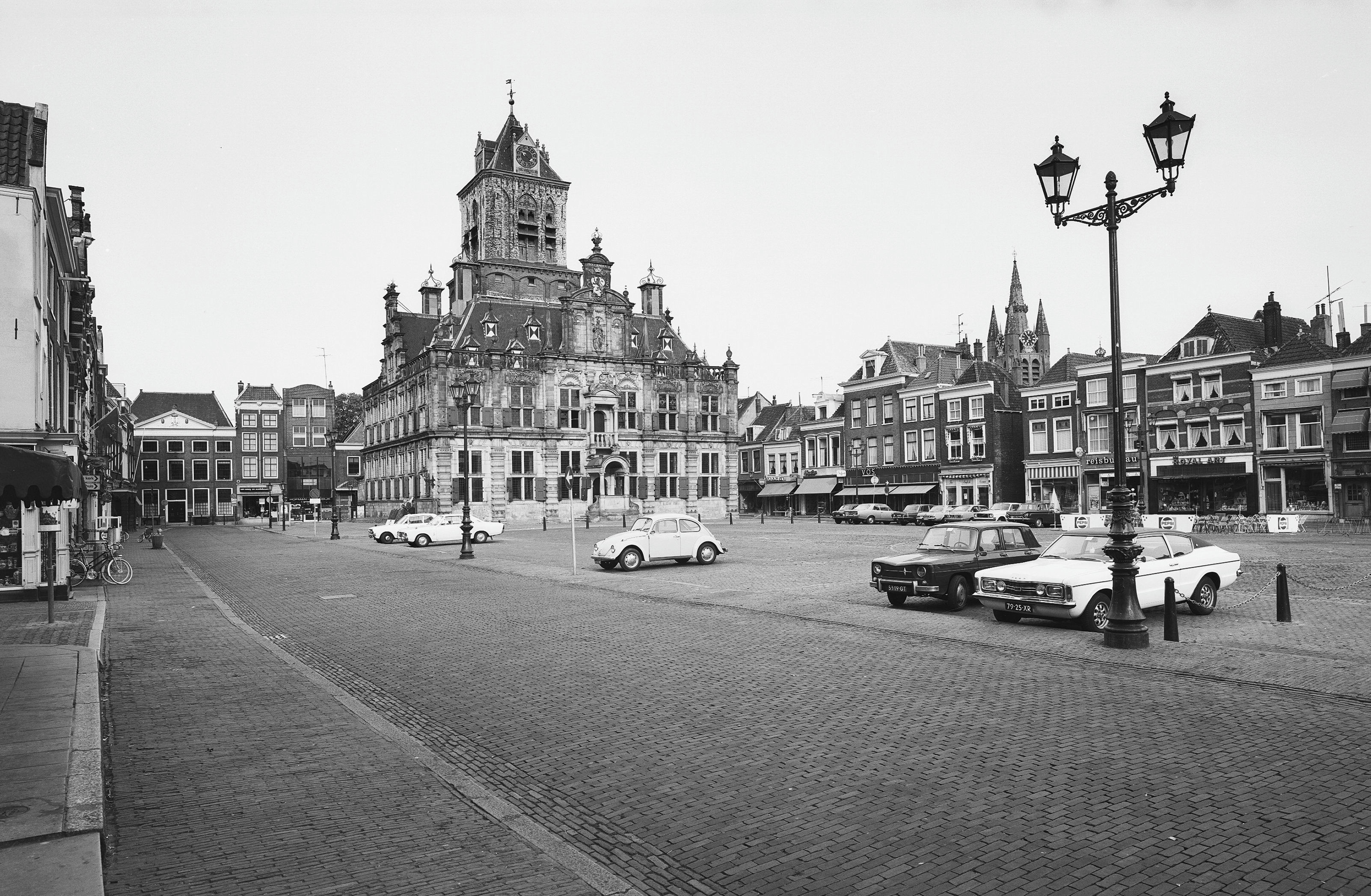
Delft city hall and market served as center of Wismar (Photo 1975)

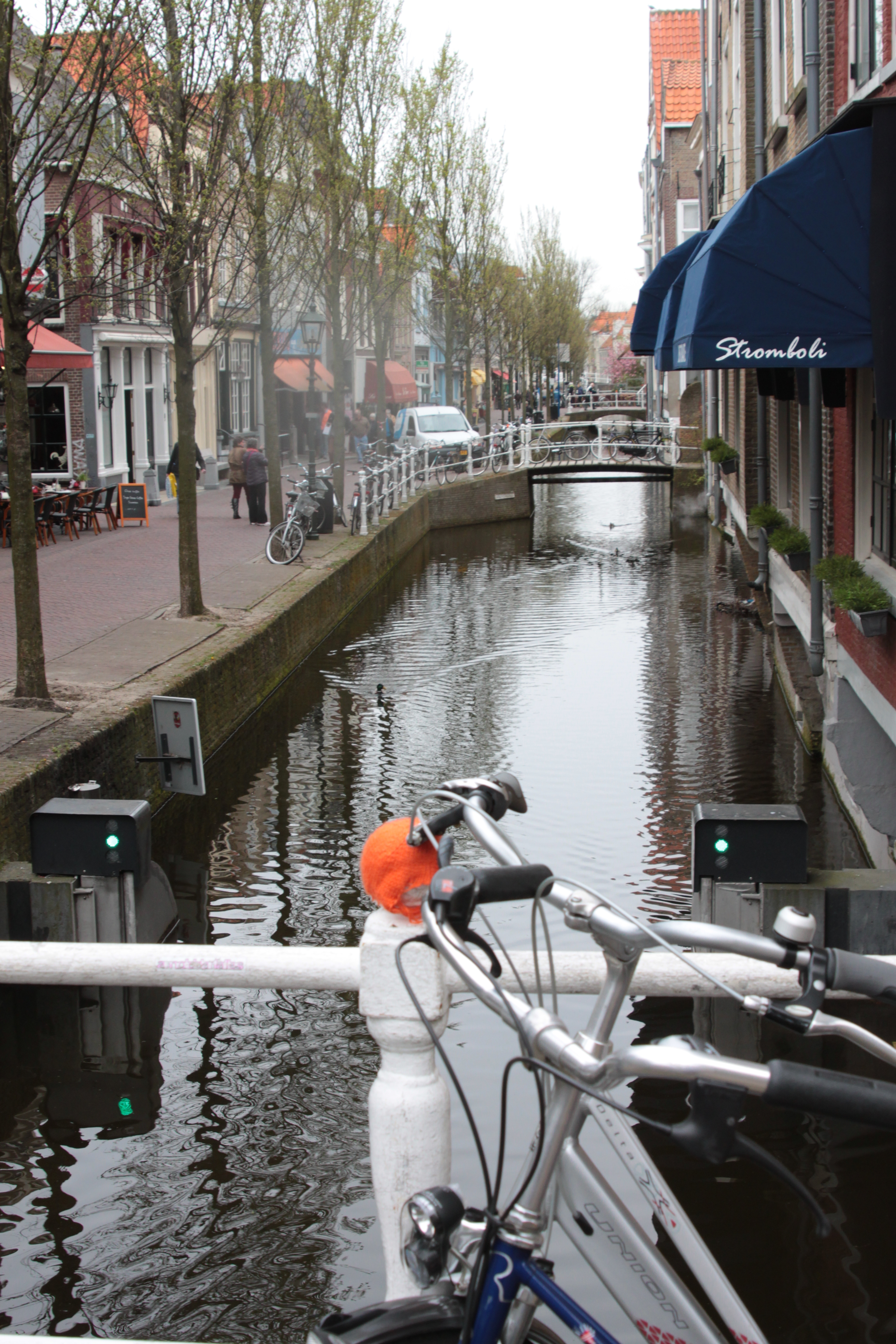
Voldersgracht in Delft as Wismar (Photo 2013)

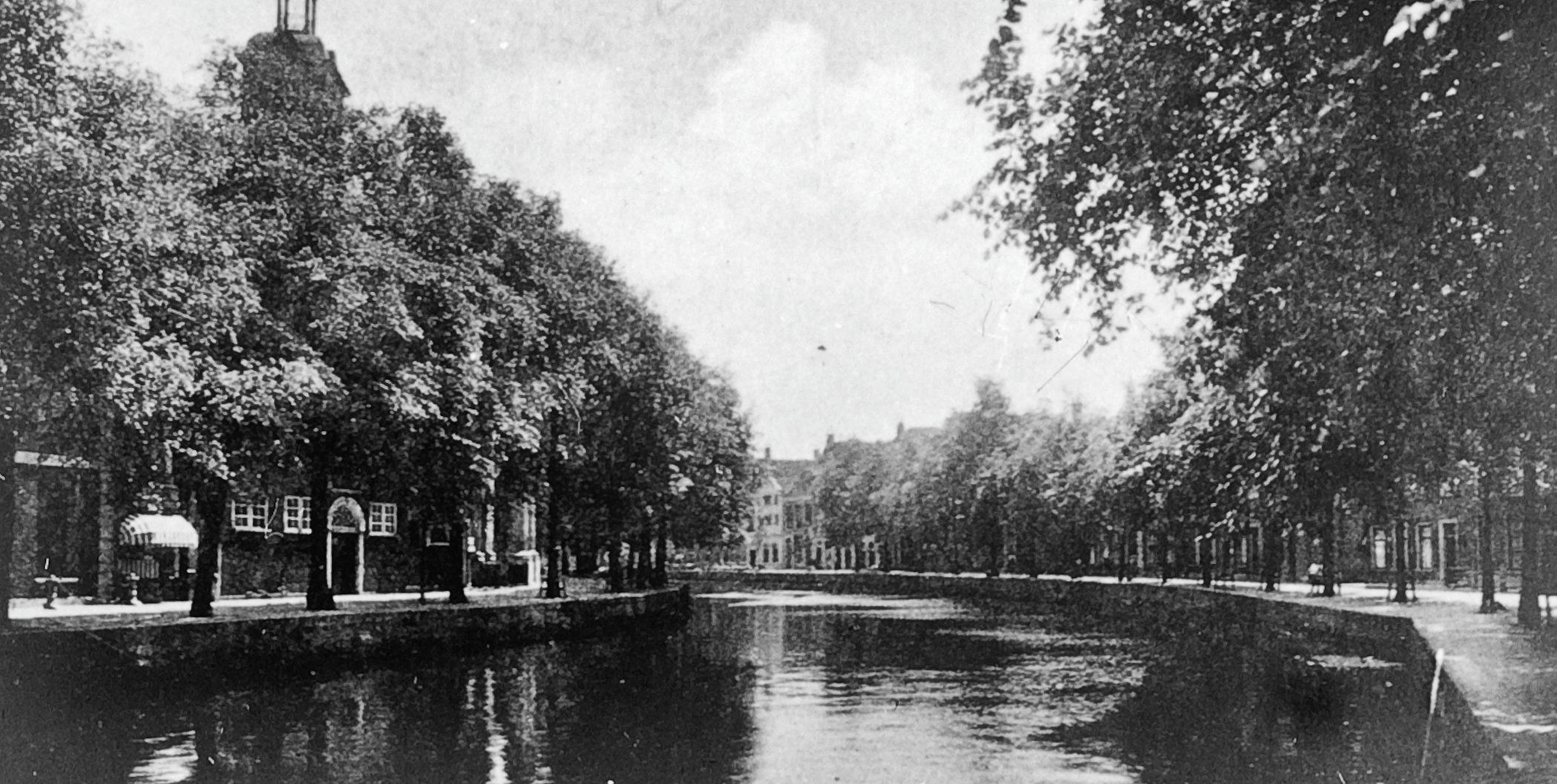
Nieuwe Haven of Schiedam as Wismar harbour (Photo 1942)

=== Music ===
The film score to Nosferatu the Vampyre was composed by the West German group Popol Vuh, who have collaborated with Herzog on numerous projects. Music for the film comprises material from the group's album Brüder des Schattens – Söhne des Lichts. Additionally, the film features Richard Wagner's prelude to Das Rheingold, Charles Gounod's "Sanctus" from Messe solennelle à Sainte Cécile and traditional Georgian folk song "Tsintskaro", sung by Vocal Ensemble Gordela.

== Release ==
Released as Nosferatu: Phantom der Nacht in German and Nosferatu the Vampyre in English, the film was entered into the 29th Berlin International Film Festival, where production designer Henning von Gierke won the Silver Bear for an outstanding single achievement.

=== Home media ===
The film was released on Blu-ray in France by Gaumont on 23 September 2010, with French-language audio and documentaries on the film's production as well as Klaus Kinski's transformation into Dracula. In Germany, StudioCanal released the film on Blu-ray on 24 January 2013, featuring both the German and English-language versions, an audio commentary by Werner Herzog and behind-the-scenes material.

In the United Kingdom, the British Film Institute released a limited-edition Blu-ray SteelBook on 19 May 2014 containing both the German- and English-language versions of the film, an audio commentary by Werner Herzog and an on-set documentary. In the United States, Shout! Factory released the film on Blu-ray the following day, likewise including both language versions and Herzog's commentary. The film was also included in the BFI's The Werner Herzog Collection Blu-ray box set later that year.

In January 2015, the BFI released the English-language version separately on DVD in a restored presentation.

A new restoration was released by the BFI on 4K UHD and Blu-ray on 22 September 2025. The editions included both the German- and English-language versions, with the 4K edition presented in Dolby Vision. In the United States, Scream Factory released a Collector's Edition 4K UHD and Blu-ray set on 21 October 2025, featuring a new 4K transfer of the original 35 mm camera negative for both language versions.

In France, Potemkine Films released a limited 4K Ultra HD Blu-ray and Blu-ray collector's edition on 3 November 2026. The release contained the French-language audio, as well as being the first French release to feature the German and English-language versions. Its extra content included a new interview with Bram Stoker biographer Alain Pozzuoli and an extended 55-minute archival behind-the-scenes documentary originally produced for the American television programme Cinema Showcase.

== Reception ==
=== Critical response ===
Film review aggregator Rotten Tomatoes reports a 93% approval critic response based on 71 reviews, with an average rating of 8.4/10. The website's critical consensus states: "Stunning visuals from Werner Herzog and an intense portrayal of the famed bloodsucker from Klaus Kinski make this remake of Nosferatu a horror classic in its own right." Metacritic, which uses a weighted average, assigned the film a score of 79 out of 100, based on 19 critics, indicating "generally favorable" reviews.

In contemporary reviews, the film is noted for maintaining an element of horror, with numerous deaths and a grim atmosphere. Still, it features a more expanded plot than many Dracula productions, with a greater emphasis on the vampire's tragic loneliness. Dracula is still a ghastly figure, but with a greater sense of pathos; weary, unloved, and doomed to immortality. Reviewer John J. Puccio of MovieMet considers it a faithful homage to Murnau's original film, significantly updating the original material and avoiding the danger of being overly derivative. Judith Martin of The Washington Post was less enthusiastic, criticizing the film as an overly familiar retelling of the Dracula story, although she acknowledged its picturesque settings and eerie atmosphere.

Roger Ebert of The Chicago Sun-Times reviewed the film upon its 1979 release, giving it four stars out of a possible four, writing: "There is nothing pleasant about Herzog's vampire", which was "played totally without ego by Klaus Kinski". Ebert added, "This movie isn't even scary. It's so slow it's meditative at times, but it is the most evocative series of images centered around the idea of the vampire that I have ever seen since F.W. Murnau's Nosferatu, which was made in 1922." In 2011 Ebert added the film to his "Great Movies Collection." Concluding his review, Ebert said:

One striking quality of the film is its beauty. Herzog's pictorial eye is not often enough credited. His films always upstage it with their themes. We are focused on what happens, and there are few 'beauty shots.' Look here at his control of the color palette, his off-center compositions, of the dramatic counterpoint of light and dark. Here is a film that does honor to the seriousness of vampires. No, I don't believe in them. But if they were real, here is how they must look.

=== Accolades ===
Award	Category	Nominee(s)	Result	Ref.
Berlin International Film Festival	Golden Bear	Werner Herzog	Nominated	
Berlin International Film Festival	Silver Bear for an outstanding single achievement	Henning von Gierke	Won (Note: Tied with Sten Holmberg for cinematography for Kejsaren)	
Cartagena Film Festival	Golden Pelican for Best Actor	Klaus Kinski	Won	
German Film Awards	Best Director	Werner Herzog	Nominated	
German Film Awards	Best Actor	Klaus Kinski	Won	
German Film Awards	Best Actress	Isabelle Adjani	Nominated	
German Film Awards	Best Cinematography	Jörg Schmidt-Reitwein	Nominated	
German Film Awards	Best Production Design	Henning von Gierke, Gisela Storch	Nominated	
National Board of Review Awards	Top Five Foreign Language Films	Nosferatu the Vampyre	Won	
Sant Jordi Awards	Best Performance in a Foreign Film	Klaus Kinski	Won	
Saturn Awards	Best Foreign Film	Nosferatu the Vampyre	Nominated	
Saturn Awards	Best Costumes	Gisela Storch	Nominated	

== Legacy ==
Nosferatu the Vampyre has subsequently been regarded as a significant reinterpretation of both the vampire film and Murnau's original. The British Film Institute has described the film as simultaneously a tribute to the silent original and the earlier German film tradition, while distinguishing it for its treatment of immortality, loneliness and the human desire for death. In 2025, the BFI included it among ten notable German horror films, arguing that Herzog had revisited the genre's past while reinventing it for different values and sensibilities.

Director Robert Eggers cited Herzog's film as an influence on his own adaptation, Nosferatu (2024). Eggers said that he had watched Herzog's version repeatedly as a teenager and acknowledged that its influence remained evident in his film, despite deliberately avoiding rewatching it during the decade in which he developed his adaptation. Lily-Rose Depp, who portrayed Ellen in Eggers's film, likewise said that she watched Isabelle Adjani's performance as Lucy and described Herzog's film as one she loved.

== See also ==
- Gothic film
- Vampire film
