= Buch-Sankt Magdalena =

- Municipality
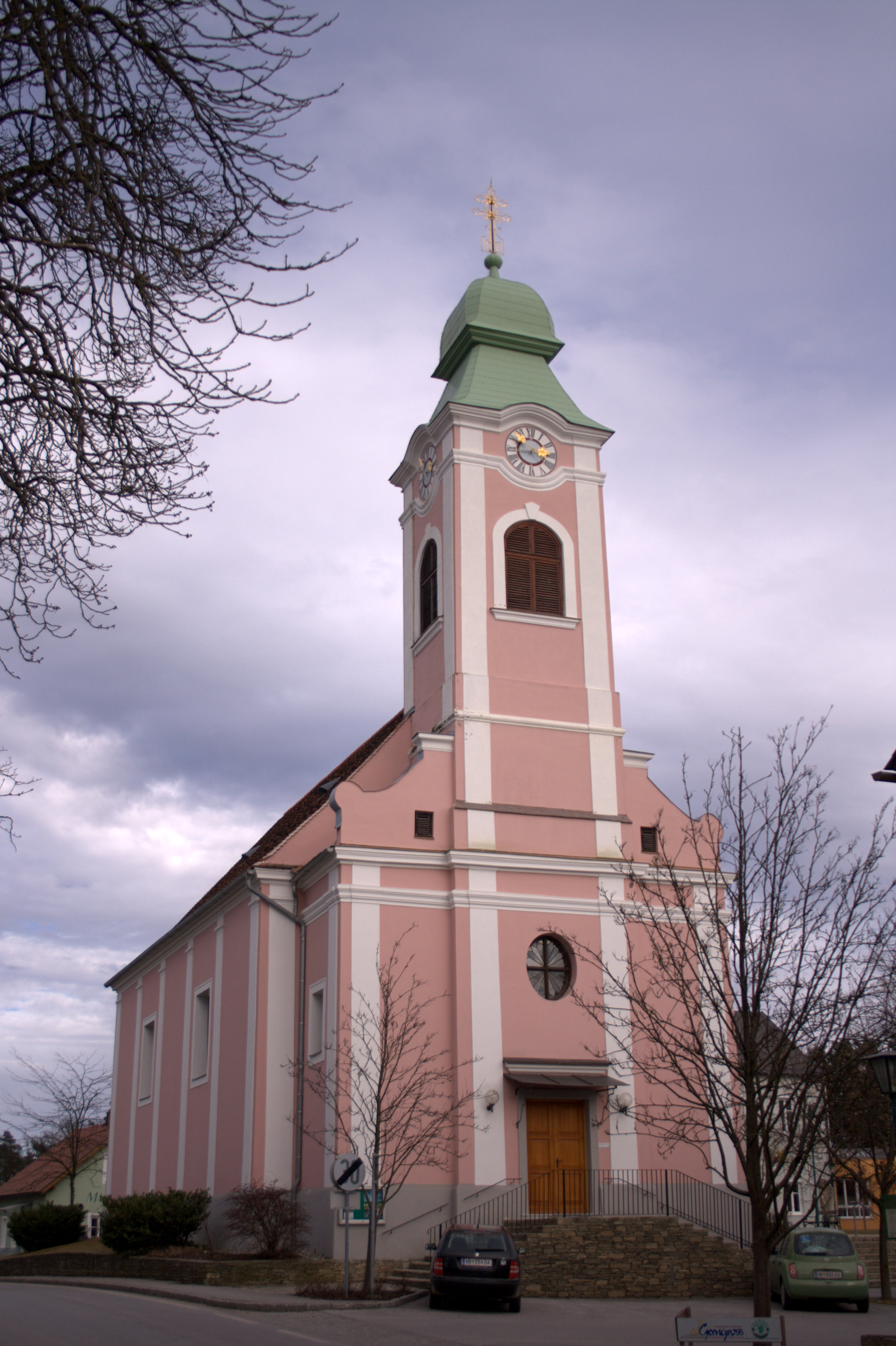
- Sankt Magdalena parish church

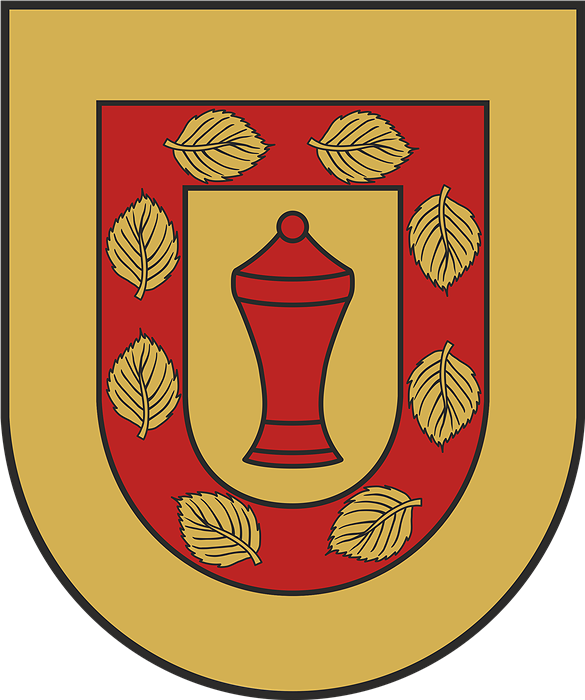
- Coat of arms

- Location within Austria
- Coordinates: 47°13′35″N 16°00′54″E
- Country: Austria
- State: Styria
- District: Hartberg-Fürstenfeld

Government
  - Mayor: Gerhard Gschiel (ÖVP)

Area
  - Total: 26.31 km^{2} (10.16 sq mi)

Population (2018-01-01)
  - Total: 2,171
  - Density: 82.52/km^{2} (213.7/sq mi)
- Time zone: UTC+1 (CET)
  - Summer (DST): UTC+2 (CEST)
- Postal code: 8272, 8274, 8294
- Area code: +43 3332
- Vehicle registration: HF
- Website: http://www.buch-stmagdalena.at/

Buch-Sankt Magdalena is a municipality in the district of Hartberg-Fürstenfeld in Styria, Austria. It was formed on 1 January 2013 by the merger of the former municipalities Sankt Magdalena am Lemberg and Buch-Geiseldorf.
