= Ludwig Hirsch =

Austrian songwriter, actor (1946–2011)

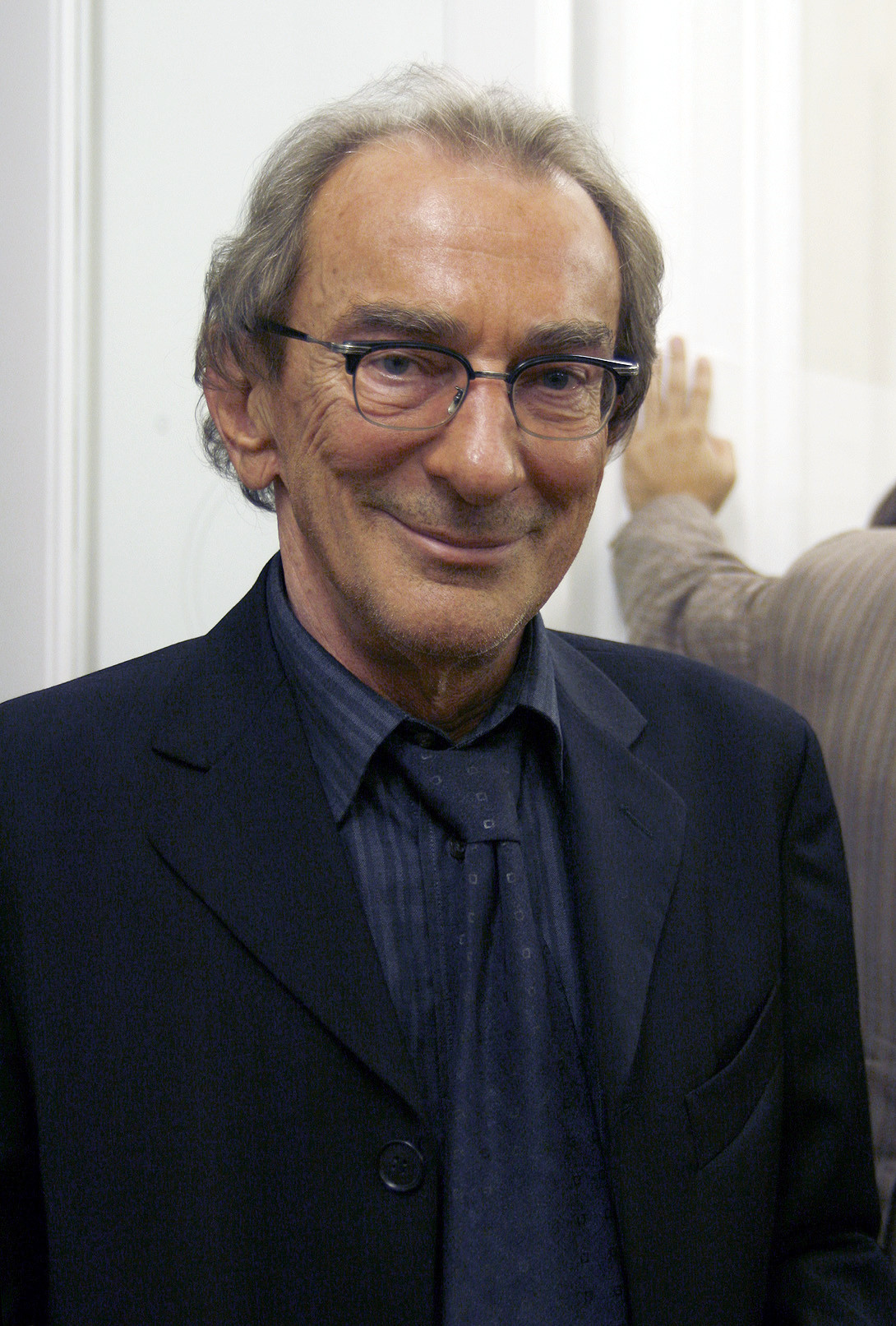

Ludwig Gustav Hirsch (28 February 1946 – 24 November 2011) was an Austrian singer/songwriter and actor.

== Life and work ==
Hirsch was born in Sankt Magdalena am Lemberg, Styria, grew up in the Leopoldstadt district of Vienna and first studied graphic arts at the University of Applied Arts Vienna, but switched to the Krauss drama school. He made his stage debut in 1973 at the municipal theater in Regensburg. From 1975 to 1979 he was a member of the ensemble of the Theater in der Josefstadt.

In 1978 Hirsch launched his career as a singer-songwriter and became known for his critical, macabre, and morbid lyrics. He is known as an outstanding representative of Austropop. In some of his works he lends modern interpretations to traditional Viennese songs (for example, the 1834 Hobellied).

In 1991 and 1992 Hirsch appeared before sold-out crowds of 200,000 spectators with his Gottlieb-Tournee, playing his most famous songs worked together into an interesting story. He often toured with guitarist Johann M. Bertl.

Hirsch's studio album Perlen (Pearls) achieved gold status in Austria and for it he was awarded the Amadeus Austrian Music Award, the highest Austrian popular music prize. His newest album, In Ewigkeit Damen, appeared in 2006. He has also hosted the radio program Siesta for the Austrian broadcaster Hitradio Ö3.

In 1977 Hirsch married actress Cornelia Köndgen and had one son with her.

In September 1993, the Austrian Post honored Hirsch with a 5½ schilling stamp. In 2001 he was awarded a silver medal for service to the City of Vienna, and was made a "Golden citizen" of the city of Vienna.

On 24 November 2011, Hirsch committed suicide by jumping from a window from the second floor of the Wilhelminenspital in Vienna where he was being treated for lung cancer. He was 65.
