= The Lunch Date =

1989 short film

- Directed by: Adam Davidson
- Written by: Adam Davidson
- Produced by: Garth Stein
- Starring: Paul Sarnoff; Scotty Bloch
- Cinematography: Anghel Decca
- Edited by: Garth Stein
- Music by: Thomas Cabaniss
- Production company: Columbia University School of the Arts
- Release date: December 1989
- Running time: 10 minutes
- Country: United States
- Language: English

The Lunch Date is a 1989 American drama short film written and directed by Adam Davidson. In 2013, the film was selected for preservation in the United States National Film Registry by the Library of Congress as being "culturally, historically, or aesthetically significant".

== Plot ==
A white woman goes into Grand Central Terminal and runs into an African American man standing in the middle of the floor. He attempts to help her pick up her belongings, and she protests. This interaction makes her miss her train, and when she leaves the station she can not find her wallet. She makes her way to a cafeteria and takes a salad, and pays for it while informing the waiter that she may not have enough money. After she sits down, she realizes that she has no cutlery, and returns to the service counter for a fork. When she comes back, she finds another African American man who appears to be homeless sitting down and eating a salad. She sits down and informs the man that that is her salad. He ignores her at first then laughs at her continued protests. She then attempts to take the salad away from him, at which point he slams his fist on the table and yells, frightening her. She watches him eat for several moments, not sure what else to do. Finally, the woman grabs her fork and snatches a piece of salad off of the plate. The man does not stop her, and she does it again and again. The man begins to mimic the way she eats and together they finish the salad. Afterwards, the man gets up and returns with two cups (assumed to be tea or coffee), and offers her sugar, which she declines. He then reaches into his pocket and pulls out a packet, which she accepts, opens, and puts in her drink. She takes a sip and then leaves the restaurant.

Once outside, she realizes that she does not have her bags. She returns to the cafeteria, and her bags are not in the booth she was sitting in. Anxious, she paces back and forth, not noticing that there are bags in the next cubicle. When she does notice, she sees a salad sitting there, along with her bags. Realizing that the man never actually stole her salad and instead was eating his own, she laughs, takes her bags, and leaves the restaurant laughing loudly.

== Cast ==
- Paul Sarnoff as Waiter
- Scotty Bloch as Lady
- Clebert Ford as Man at Diner

== Awards ==
It was entered into the 1990 Cannes Film Festival, where it won the Short Film Palme d'Or. It later went on to be selected as "Dramatic Achievement" in the Student Academy Awards competition on June 10, 1990, and won an Academy Award in 1991 for Best Short Subject.
