= Abraham's Gold =

1990 film

- Directed by: Jörg Graser
- Written by: Jörg Graser
- Produced by: Christoph Holch
- Starring: Hanna Schygulla
- Cinematography: Henning Stegmüller
- Edited by: Helga Borsche
- Release date: 26 April 1990
- Running time: 95 minutes
- Country: West Germany
- Language: German

Abraham's Gold (German: Abrahams Gold) is a 1990 German drama film directed by Jörg Graser. It was screened in the Un Certain Regard section at the 1990 Cannes Film Festival.

== Cast ==
- Hanna Schygulla – Barbara "Bärbel" Hunzinger
- Günther Maria Halmer – Karl Lechner
- Daniela Schötz – Annamirl Hunzinger
- Robert Dietl – Huntziger
- Maria Singer – Lechnerin
- Karl Friedrich – Probst, Bürgermeister
- Otto Tausig – Pfarrer
- Harry Täschner – Polizist
- Sepp Schauer – Polizist
- Johanna Bittenbinder – Verkäuferin
- Christiane Blumhoff – Köchin
- Toni Gierl – Köchin
