= Elke Heidenreich =

German author and journalist (born 1943)

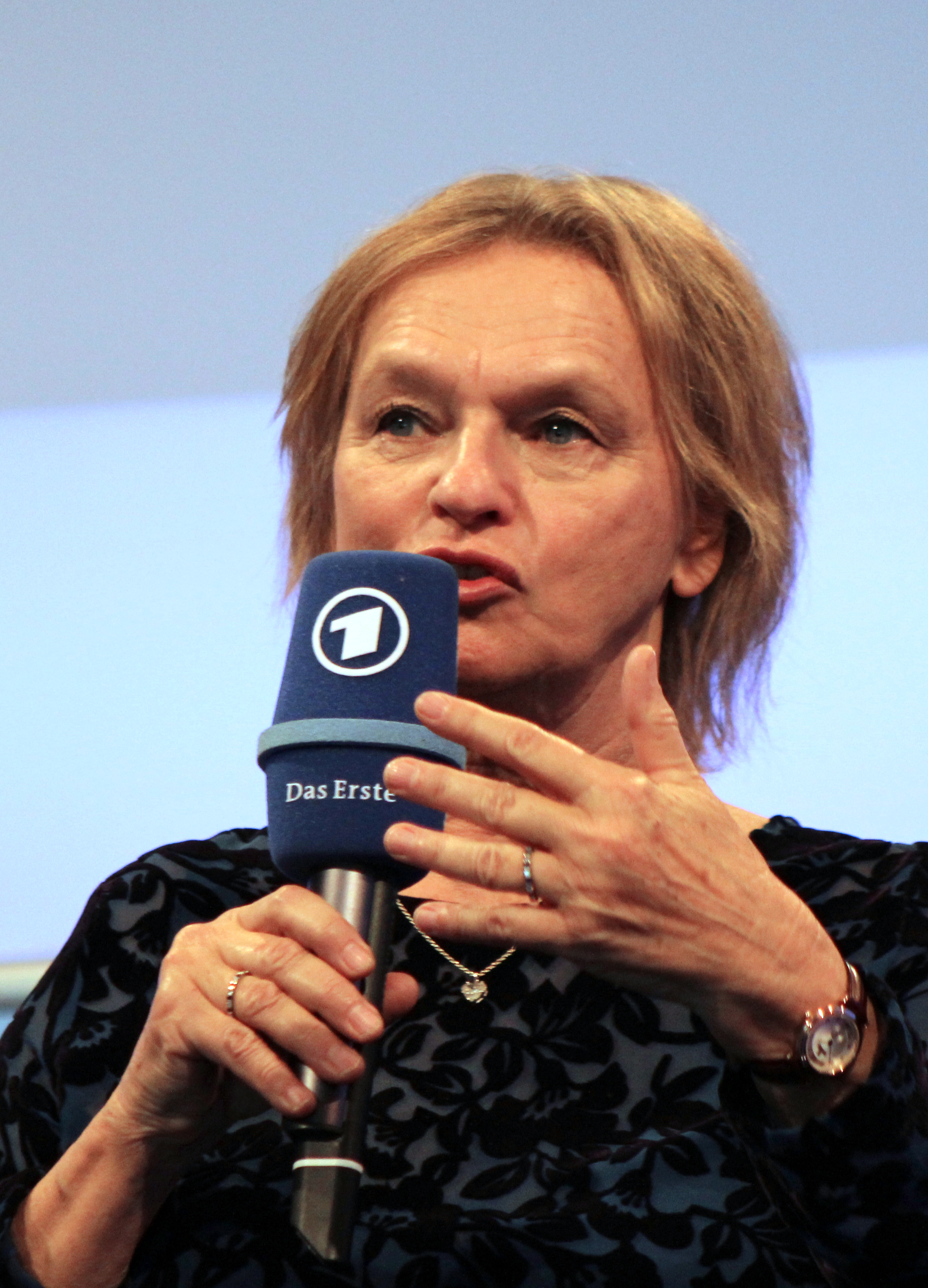
- Heidenreich in 2012
- Born: Elke Helene Riegert; 15 February 1943 (age 82); Korbach, Germany
- Occupations: Author; Television presenter; Literary critic; Journalist
- Awards: Goldene Kamera; Mildred L. Batchelder Award; Bambi; Grimme-Preis

Elke Heidenreich (née Riegert; born 15 February 1943) is a German author, TV presenter, literary critic and journalist. She has written audio plays, a magazine column, scripts for television plays and books. Heidenreich is known as the Kabarettist who created a character, Else Stratmann. She is a literary critic in the television Literaturclub of the Schweizer Fernsehen.

She was awarded a Goldene Kamera in 1981, and the Bambi in 2003 for her series Lesen!, aimed at making reading of literature more popular. In 2006, she received the Grimme Award for her life's work in television. Her children's book Nero Corleone was translated to many languages and received several international prizes. She wrote Alte Liebe in collaboration with Bernd Schroeder, with whom she was married from 1972 but separated in the 1990s. Passionate about opera, she worked for children's operas at the Cologne Opera for 12 years, and wrote librettos and books, introducing a broader public to its culture.

== Life ==
Heidenreich was born Elke Helene Riegert in Korbach and grew up in Essen. From 1963 to 1969, she studied German, publication, religion and theatre history at the universities of Munich, Hamburg and Berlin. She married Gert Heidenreich in 1965. They separated, and she married Bernd Schroeder, an author of books and film scripts, in 1972. She was a freelance journalist for the SWR television and radio from 1970. With her husband, she wrote the audio play Die Geburtstage der Gaby Hambacher in 1971, and the script for the 1977 film Scrounged Meals. She wrote a regular column for Brigitte magazine from 1983 to 1999, entitled Also. From 1975, she was successful as a Kabarettist, creating the character Else Stratmann. She became known for writing TV shows, often about literature, such as Lesen (Reading), Literaturmagazin (Literary magazine), Durchblick, Kölner Treff (Meeting in Cologne) and live. In 1993 and 1994 she presented the Literaturclub of the Schweizer Fernsehen and has been a critic in its team since 2012.

Heidenreich has written several books, audio books and film scripts. In 1995, she wrote Nero Corleone, a story with a tomcat as the bullying protagonist. It was translated into 24 languages and received a Dutch prize for the best children's book for readers age six and older. In 1988, the translation to English was honoured with the Mildred L. Batchelder Award. She and her husband separated in 1995, but kept up literary collaboration, writing Rudernde Hunde in 2002 and Alte Liebe in 2010. She wrote Kolonien der Liebe and Am Südpol, denkt man, ist es heiß in 1998, Der Welt den Rücken in 2002, and Mit unseren Augen in 2007. Heidenreich lives in Cologne.

Heidenreich is passionate about opera. Her mother bought her a ticket for Die Zauberflöte at the Essen Opera in 1956 when she was age 13. She worked for the Cologne Opera with managers Günter Krämer, Christoph Dammann and Uwe Eric Laufenberg, especially 12 years for the Kinderoper (operas for children). In 2004, she produced a CD together with Christian Schullen, entitled Oper! – Eine Liebeserklärung (Opera! – A declaration of love). When Laufenberg became manager at the Hessisches Staatstheater Wiesbaden, she began a series of opera introductions, entitled Passione, in 2014, presented in dialogue with an expert. She wrote the libretto for the opera Adriana by Marc-Aurel Floros, premiered at the Kammeroper Schloss Rheinsberg in 2015. She called opera a "power plant of emotions" (Gefühlskraftwerk), and wrote books on the topic, aiming at a broader interest in its culture.

== Works ==
Heidenreich's works are held by the German National Library, including:

=== Books ===
- Darf’s ein bisschen mehr sein?, 1984
- Geschnitten oder am Stück?, 1985
- Kein schöner Land – ein Deutschlandlied in sechs Sätzen, 1985
- Mit oder ohne Knochen?, 1986
- Unternehmen Arche Noah, 1986
- „Also …“ – Kolumnen aus der Brigitte, 1988
- Datt kann donnich gesund sein – Else Stratmann über Sport, Olympia und Dingens, 1988
- Kolonien der Liebe, 1992
- Nero Corleone, 1995
  - Heidenreich, Elke (1997). Nero Corleone. A Cat's Story. Viking Juvenile. ISBN 978-0-670-87395-1.
- Am Südpol, denkt man, ist es heiß, 1998
  - Heidenreich, Elke (2001). Some Folk Think the South Pole's Hot. The Three Tenors Play the Antarctic. Boston: Godine. ISBN 1-56792-170-1.
- Sonst noch was, 1999
- Der Welt den Rücken (short stories), 2002
- Rudernde Hunde (short stories, together with Bernd Schroeder), 2002
- Schlafes Mörder – über Shakespeares Macbeth (together with Tom Krausz), 2002
- Nurejews Hund – Was Sehnsucht vermag, 2002
- Erika – oder der verborgene Sinn des Lebens. Sanssouci Verlag. Munich 2002.
- Mit unseren Augen – Reisegeschichten (together with Tom Krausz), 2007
- Die Liebe, 2008
- Eine Reise durch Verdis Italien, 2008
- Passione. Liebeserklärung an die Musik. Carl Hanser Verlag, Munich 2009. ISBN 978-3-446-23325-6.
- Alte Liebe. Geschichten (together with Bernd Schroeder). Carl Hanser Verlag. Munich 2009. ISBN 978-3-446-23393-5.
- Nero Corleone kehrt zurück. Carl Hanser Verlag. Munich 2011. ISBN 978-3-446-23661-5.
- With Tom Krausz: Dylan Thomas – Waliser. Dichter. Trinker. Munich 2011. ISBN 978-3-86873-222-1.

== Filmography ==
- Raumpatrouille Orion – Rücksturz ins Kino. Film, 2003.
- Elke Heidenreich: Ganz so leicht muss es auch nicht sein. Documentary, Germany 2003
- Elke Heidenreich – höchstpersönlich! TV report, Radio Bremen, 2008
- Die Besten im Westen – Elke Heidenreich. Documentary, Germany 2008

== Awards ==
- 1981: Goldene Kamera in the category Best Author
- 1984: Goldene Europa
- 1985: Adolf Grimme Award
- 1988: Mildred L. Batchelder Award for Nero Corleone
- 2003: Bambi for Lesen!
- 2006: Adolf Grimme Award
- 2011: Corine Literature Prize
