= 29th Berlin International Film Festival =

1979 film festival in West Berlin, Germany

- Festival poster
- Location: West Berlin, Germany
- Founded: 1951
- Awards: Golden Bear: David
- Festival date: 20 February – 3 March 1979
- Website: Website

Berlin International Film Festival chronology
- 30th 29th

The 29th Berlin International Film Festival was held from 20 February – 3 March 1979. The Golden Bear was awarded to David directed by Peter Lilienthal.

The retrospective was dedicated to Italian actor Rudolph Valentino and to another one titled "We Danced Around the World. Revue Films".

== Controversy ==
Michael Cimino's The Deer Hunter selection for the main competition was surrounded by controversy, as it was accused of racism, and several countries decided to withdraw their films from the festival in protest.

== Juries ==
The following people were announced as being on the jury for the festival:

=== Main Competition ===
- Jörn Donner, Finnish filmmaker - Jury President
- Julie Christie, British actress
- Romain Gary, French writer and screenwriter
- Ingrid Caven, German actress and singer
- Georg Alexander, German actor
- Liliana Cavani, Italian director and screenwriter
- Paul Bartel, American actor, director and screenwriter
- Pál Gábor, Hungarian director and screenwriter (Hungary)
- Věra Chytilová, Czech director and screenwriter

== Official Sections ==
=== Main Competition ===
The following films were in competition for the Golden Bear award:

English Title	Original Title	Director(s)	Production Country
The Adolescent	L'Adolescente	Jeanne Moreau	France
Albert – Why?	Albert – warum?	Josef Rödl	West Germany
Alexandria... Why?	إسكندرية ليه	Youssef Chahine	Egypt
David		Peter Lilienthal	West Germany
The Deer Hunter		Michael Cimino	United States
Ernesto		Salvatore Samperi	Italy
The First Polka	Die erste Polka	Klaus Emmerich	West Germany
Hardcore		Paul Schrader	United States
Heart of the Forest	El corazón del bosque	Manuel Gutiérrez Aragón	Spain
Kassbach – Ein Porträt		Peter Patzak	Austria
Kejsaren		Jösta Hagelbäck	Sweden
Love on the Run	L'amour en fuite	François Truffaut	France
The Marriage of Maria Braun	Die Ehe der Maria Braun	Rainer Werner Fassbinder	West Germany
Meetings with Remarkable Men		Peter Brook	United Kingdom
Messidor		Alain Tanner	Switzerland
Movie Movie		Stanley Donen	United States
Nosferatu the Vampyre	Nosferatu: Phantom der Nacht	Werner Herzog	West Germany
Origins of a Meal	Genèse d'un repas	Luc Moullet	France
Parashuram	পরশুরাম	Mrinal Sen	India
Phantom		René Perraudin and Uwe Schrader	West Germany
The Stud Farm	A ménesgazda	András Kovács	Hungary
Ubu		Geoff Dunbar	United Kingdom
Winterborn	Vinterbørn	Astrid Henning-Jensen	Denmark

1979 Retrospective poster, featuring Rudolph Valentino

=== Out of Competition ===
- Het verloren paradijs, directed by Harry Kümel (Belgium)

=== Retrospective ===
The following films were shown in the retrospective dedicated to Rudolph Valentino:

English title	Original title	Director(s)	Production Country
All Night		Paul Powell	United States
Blood and Sand		Fred Niblo	United States
Eyes of Youth		Albert Parker	United States
Monsieur Beaucaire		Sidney Olcott	United States
Moran of the Lady Letty		George Melford	United States
The Conquering Power		Rex Ingram	United States
The Eagle		Clarence Brown	United States
The Four Horsemen of the Apocalypse		Rex Ingram	United States
The Sheik		George Melford	United States
The Son of the Sheik		George Fitzmaurice	United States
The Wonderful Chance		George Archainbaud	United States

== Official Awards ==
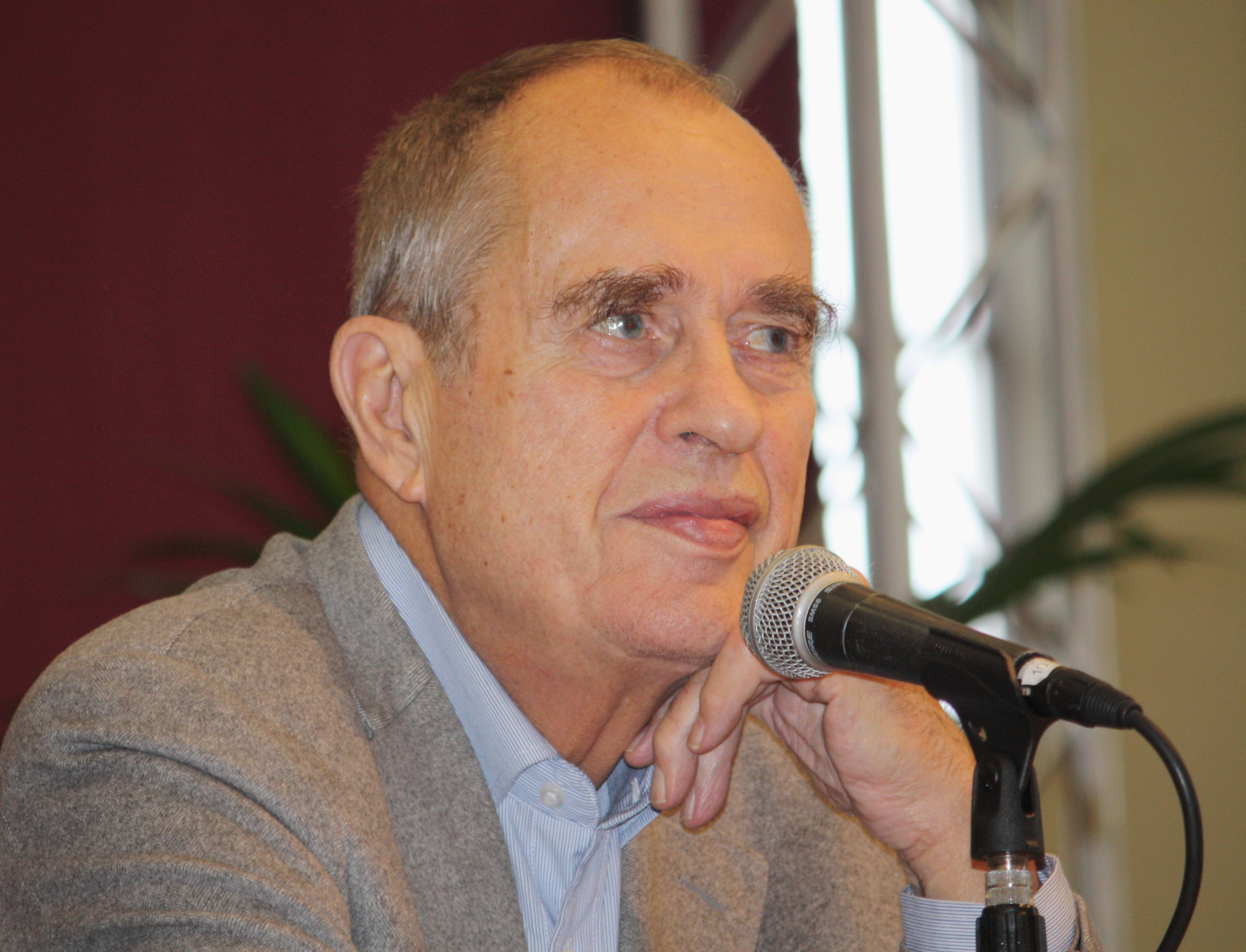
Jörn Donner, Jury President

The following prizes were awarded by the Jury:

- Golden Bear: David by Peter Lilienthal
- Silver Bear – Special Jury Prize: Alexandria... Why? by Youssef Chahine
- Silver Bear for Best Director: Astrid Henning-Jensen for Winterborn
- Silver Bear for Best Actress: Hanna Schygulla for The Marriage of Maria Braun
- Silver Bear for Best Actor: Michele Placido for Ernesto
- Silver Bear for an outstanding single achievement:
  - Henning von Gierke for Nosferatu the Vampyre
  - Sten Holmberg for Kejsaren
- Silver Bear: The Marriage of Maria Braun by Rainer Werner Fassbinder
