= Night Out (film) =

1989 film

- Directed by: Lawrence Johnston
- Written by: Lawrence Johnston
- Starring: Colin Batrouney
- Cinematography: Brent Crockett
- Release date: 1989
- Running time: 50 minutes
- Country: Australia
- Language: English

Night Out is a 1989 Australian drama film directed by Lawrence Johnston. It is about the consequences of a gay bashing. Johnston made it as his graduating work for his Swinburne Film and Television School studies. It was screened in the Un Certain Regard section at the 1990 Cannes Film Festival.

== Cast ==
- Colin Batrouney as Tony
- David Bonney as Steve
- John Brumpton
- Luke Elliot
- Andrew Larkins
- Tom Sherlock
- Matthew Willis

== Reception ==
Tony Squires in the Sydney Morning Herald wrote "There is much to admire in Johnston's frank, atmospheric and occasionally brutal piece. Although its opening scenes look cheap and uneven, the black-and-white images become more striking as the film progresses." When broadcast on TV by SBS Bridget Wilson, also in the Sydney Morning Herald, begins "At last, some credible performances by gay characters. It's not often gays even make it to our TV screens and, usually, when they do, something just doesn't click. But Night Out proves that with a decent script (although this one is minimal) and good direction, believable performances can be had." Peter Malone wrote "The film is the equivalent of a short story and relies on the audience being sympathetic to the actors and their interpretation of the characters, long close-ups on the characters to identify with their thoughts and feelings." Peter Kemp in Filmnews says it "artfully uses the properties of light and shade to produce passages of dark poetry that recall, all at once, the transgressive homosenual intensities of Jean Genet, Robert Mapplethorpe, and Pier Paolo Pasolini. No mean achievement in this finely thought-out superbly felt film."
