= Norbert Gastell =

German actor (1929–2015)

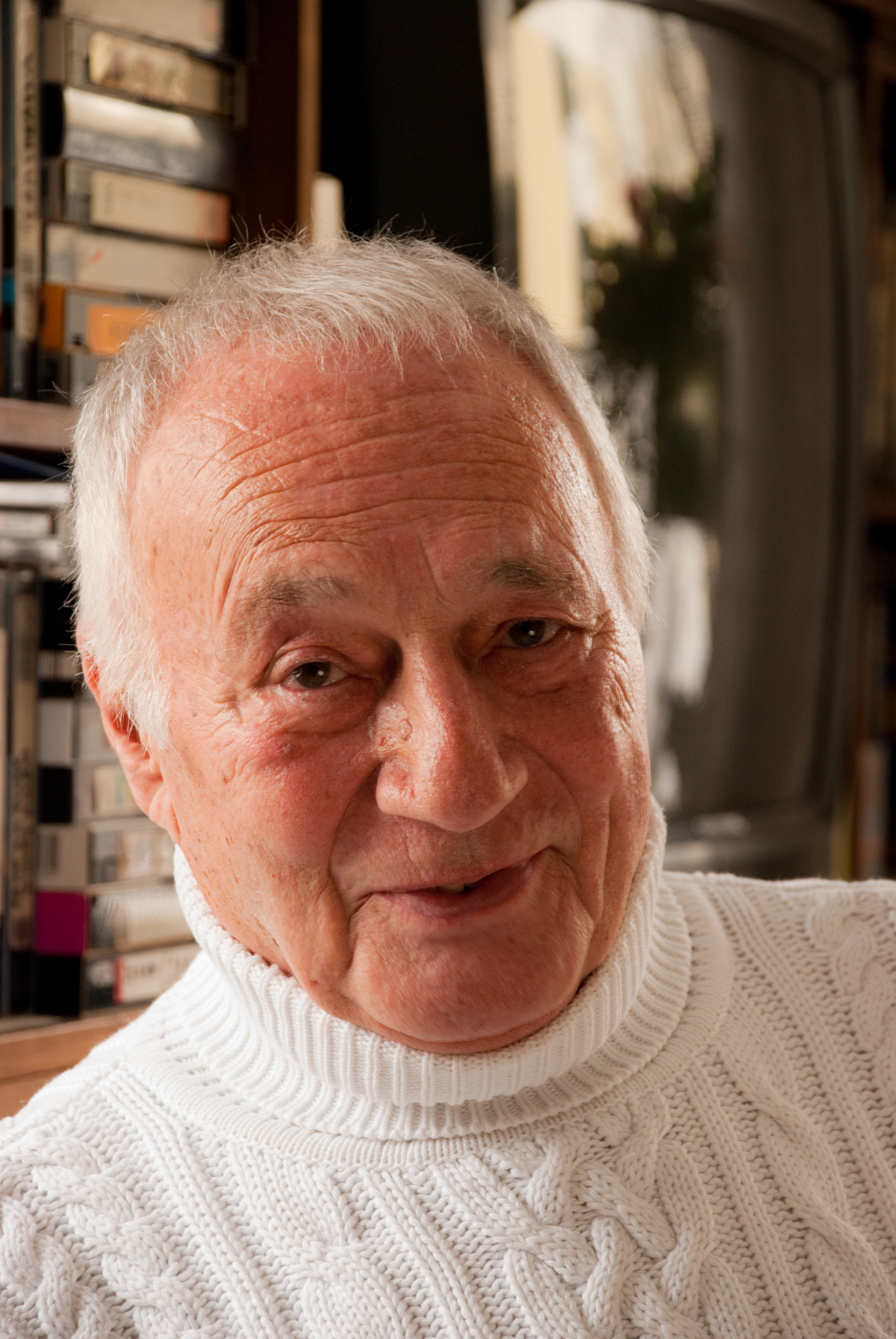
- Born: Emilio Norberto Gastel; 14 October 1929; Buenos Aires, Argentina
- Died: 26 November 2015 (aged 86); Munich, Germany
- Occupation: Actor
- Years active: 1952–2015
- Spouse: Karin Heym

Norbert Gastell (14 October 1929 – 26 November 2015) was a German actor who specialized in dubbing. He was born to German parents, but grew up in Argentina. He moved to Munich in 1938.

Gastell was best known in Germany as the voice of Homer Simpson in the German version of The Simpsons, which he provided since the series was first aired in 1991 until his death. He is also remembered for dubbing the character Trevor Ochmonek in the sitcom ALF, Coach Pantusso in Cheers and Cornelius Fudge in the Harry Potter films. He was also active in radio plays.

He died in Munich at the age of 86.

== Partial filmography ==
- 1962: Dicke Luft – Barkeeper #2 (uncredited)
- 1963: The Pirates of the Mississippi – Barkeeper Roy (voice, uncredited)
- 1963-1966: Kommissar Freytag – Herr Werner / Schrimm / Herr Müller
- 1965: Die Letzten drei der Albatross – Captain (voice, uncredited)
- 1966: Der Mörder mit dem Seidenschal – Polizeibewacher Claudias (voice, uncredited)
- 1966: Raumpatrouille (TV Series) – Hydra-Offizier / Hydra-Bordingenieur
- 1967: Flucht ohne Ausweg (TV Mini-Series) – 2. Wachtmeister
- 1968-1980: Aktenzeichen XY… ungelöst (TV Series) – Kriminalkommissar in Passau
- 1971: My Father, the Ape and I – Kriminalbeamter (voice, uncredited)
- 1971: Operation Walküre (TV Movie) – Fritz Thiele
- 1972: Die rote Kapelle (TV Mini-Series) – Feldwebel Traxl
- 1972: The Stuff That Dreams Are Made Of – Chefredakteur Lester (voice, uncredited)
- 1973: The Bloody Vultures of Alaska – Achua-hua (voice, uncredited)
- 1974: Mordkommission (TV Series) – Markus Behn
- 1974: Ach jodel mir noch einen – Stosstrupp Venus bläst zum Angriff – Karl (voice, uncredited)
- 1975: Das verrückteste Auto der Welt – Mr. Brown II (voice, uncredited)
- 1978: SOKO 5113 (TV Series)
- 1979: Nosferatu the Vampyre – Coachman / Town official's assistant (voice, uncredited)
- 1979: Der Millionenbauer (TV Series) – Chefarzt
- 1979: Lucky Star – Vater (voice)
- 1980: Merlin (TV Series) – Sir Lark
- 1981: Ein Kaktus ist kein Lutschbonbon – Jesus (voice)
- 1981: Die Todesgöttin des Liebescamps – Inspector (voice, uncredited)
- 1984: Die Wiesingers (TV Series)
- 19851993: Tatort (TV Series) – Stadtrat Völk
- 1988: Betrayed – (German version)
- 1989: Löwengrube (TV Series) – Bezirksamtsmann
- 1989-2006: Forsthaus Falkenau – Herr Leonhard alias Herr Schwarz
- 1991: Go Trabi Go – Narrator – Notfallsäule (voice, uncredited)
- 1991: Success – Direktor des Deutschen Museums
- 1994: Mutter, ich will nicht sterben! (TV Movie) – Arzt
- 1995: Tödliche Wahl (TV miniseries)
- 2001: Samt und Seide (TV Series) – Pfarrer
