= Bernd Schroeder =

German writer (1944–2023)

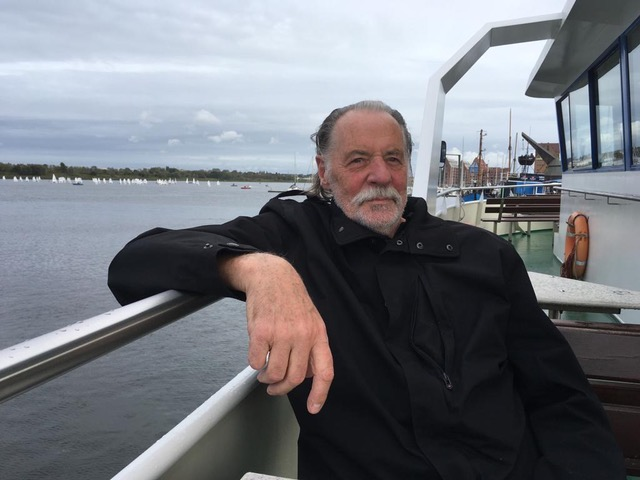
- Bernd Schroeder ca. 2020
- Born: 6 June 1944 Aussig, Reichsgau Sudetenland, Germany
- Died: 18 June 2023 (aged 79)
- Occupation: Writer; director of audio plays
- Education: LMU Munich
- Notable awards: Grimme-Preis; German Film Award
- Spouse: Elke Heidenreich (m. 1972)

Bernd Schroeder (6 June 1944 – 18 June 2023) was a German writer who authored books, television plays, film scripts, and audio plays. He also directed audio plays. He co-authored the bestseller novel Alte Liebe with Elke Heidenreich, and received several awards including the Grimme-Preis.

== Life and career ==
Schroeder was born in Aussig, Reichsgau Sudetenland, when his parents fled during World War II. He grew up in Fürholzen near Neufahrn, Upper Bavaria. He attended the Camerloher-Gymnasium Freising and finished with the Abitur. He studied theatre science, German studies and ethnology at LMU Munich from 1966.

Schroeder first worked, already during his studies, as assistant director for the broadcaster Bayerischer Rundfunk (BR). He wrote film scripts from 1968, including for Wolfgang Petersen. He directed audio plays, both his own and of others. In 1986, he was awarded the Grimme-Preis for Der eiserne Weg, together with Hans-Werner Schmidt. In 1992, he received the German Film Award. He wrote novels from 1993. Schroeder was a member of the PEN Centre Germany.

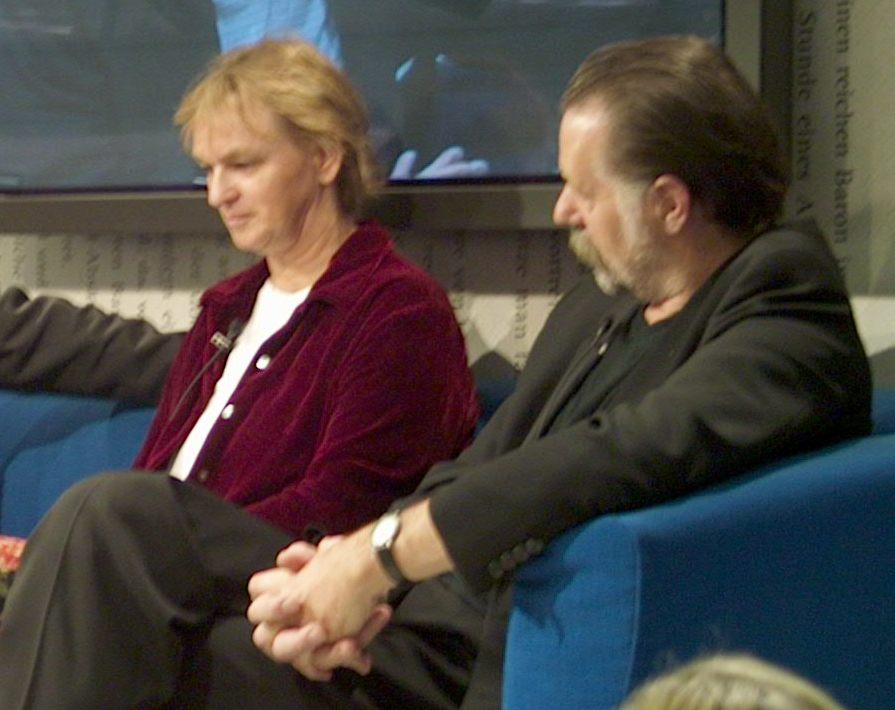
Elke Heidenreich and Schroeder interviewed, Das Blaue Sofa, 2001

Schroeder married Elke Heidenreich in 1972. They collaborated on audio plays in the 1970s, and wrote books together after they separated in 1995, Rudernde Hunde in 2002, and Alte Liebe in 2009, which became a bestseller. They are the speakers in an audio play after Alte Liebe. He summarised his work: "Ich schreibe ja immer aus dem Steinbruch meines eigenen Lebens heraus." (I always write from the quarry of my own life.)

Schroeder's last residence was Ahrenshoop. He died on 18 June 2023, at the age of 79.

== Works ==
=== Books ===
- with Hanns Dieter Hüsch: Hanns Dieter Hüsch hat jetzt zugegeben… (Eine Collage). Arche Verlag, 1985, ISBN 3-7160-2026-5.
- Versunkenes Land : ein Roman. 1993.
- Die Madonnina. 2001.
- with Elke Heidenreich: Rudernde Hunde. 2002.
- Mutter & Sohn : Erzählung. 2004.
- Hau. 2006.
- mit Dieter Hildebrandt: Ich mußte immer lachen. Kiepenheuer & Witsch 2006.
- with Elke Heidenreich: Alte Liebe. Hanser 2009, ISBN 978-3-446-23393-5.
- Auf Amerika. Roman. Hanser, München 2012, ISBN 978-3-446-23885-5. (Fischer Taschenbuch, Frankfurt am Main 2014, ISBN 978-3-596-19589-3)
- Wir sind doch alle da. Hanser, München 2013.
- Warten auf Goebbels. Hanser, München 2017.

=== Screenplays ===
Schroeder's screenplays include:

- 8051 Grinning, 1972, TV film, directed by Peter Beauvais
- Sittengemälde, 1973, TV film, directed by Eberhard Itzenplitz
- Nestwärme, 1973, TV film, directed by Eberhard Itzenplitz
- Münchner Gschichtn, 1974, TV series, 2 episodes, directed by Herbert Vesely
- Münchnerinnen, 1975, TV film, directed by Eberhard Itzenplitz
- Die Stadt im Tal, 1975, TV film, directed by Wolfgang Petersen
- Hahnenkampf, 1975, TV film, directed by Lutz Büscher
- Die Herausforderung, 1975, TV film, directed by Michael Verhoeven
- Hans im Glück, 1976, TV film, directed by Wolfgang Petersen
- Scrounged Meals, 1977, directed by Michael Verhoeven
- Notwehr, 1977, TV film, directed by Hartmut Griesmayr
- Menschenfresser, 1977, TV film, directed by Rainer Boldt
- Bier und Spiele, 1978, TV series of 14 episodes, directed by Michael Verhoeven
- Qualverwandtschaften, 1982, TV film, directed by Ulrich Heising
- Kein schöner Land, 1982, TV series of 6 episodes, directed by Klaus Emmerich
- Glückspilze, 1984, TV series, 2 episodes, directed by Bernd Schroeder
- Der eiserne Weg, 1985, TV miniseries, directed by Wolfgang Staudte and Hans‑Werner Schmidt
- Preisausschreiben, 1985, TV film, directed by Bernd Schroeder
- Da Capo, 1986, TV film, directed by Bernd Schroeder
- Fraulein, 1986, TV film, directed by Michael Haneke
- Dreifacher Rittberger, 1987, TV series in 5 episodes, book by Elke Heidenreich, directed by Bernd Schroeder
- Pizza Colonia, 1991, directed by Klaus Emmerich

=== Audio plays ===
Schroeder's audio plays include:

- Kreuzerlschreiber, 1969, directed by Hellmuth Kirchammer
- Zwischenbilanz, 1970, directed by Edmund Steinberger
- Miteinander-Füreinander, 1971, directed by Alexander Malachowsky
- Die Geburtstag der Gaby Hambacher, 1971, directed by Wolf Euba
- Hans, 1975, directed by Schroeder
- Rentenheirat, 1977, directed by Schroeder
- Alte Bäume, 1977–80, series of 12 short audio plays, directed by Otto Düben et.al.
- Versunkenes Land, 1995, in two parts, directed by Schroeder
- Wasser für Bayern, 1996–2000, series in 14 episodes, directed by Schroeder
- Unter Brüdern, 1999, in two parts, directed by Schroeder

=== Plays ===
Schroeder's plays include:

- Kater Lampe; 1979, arranged for the stage for Volksbühne Berlin
- General Mutter, 2013
