= Alte Liebe =

2009 novel by Elke Heidenreich and Bernd Schroeder

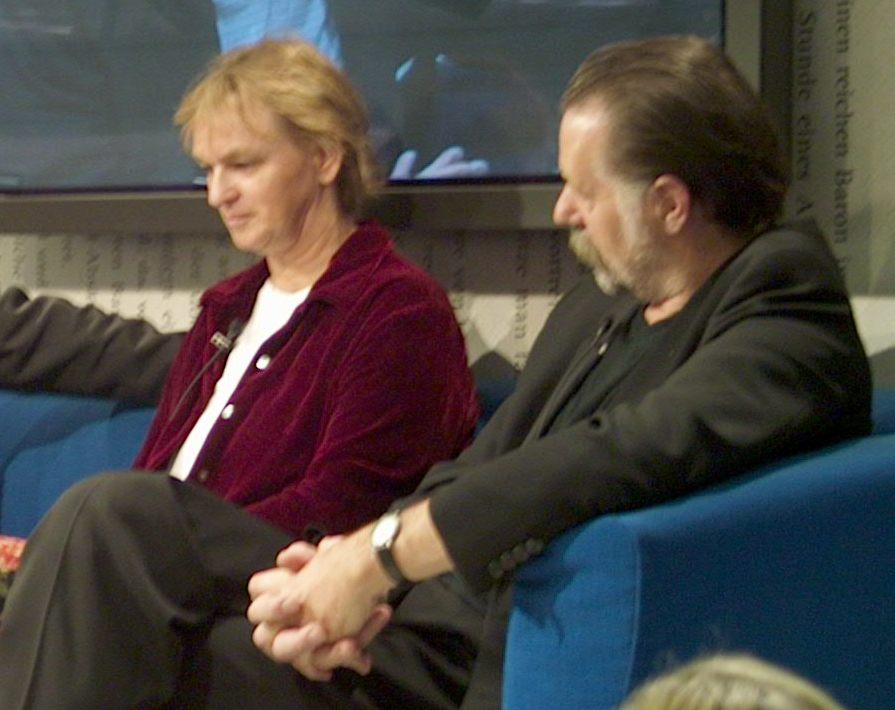
- Elke Heidenreich and Bernd Schroeder interviewed, Das Blaue Sofa, in 2001
- Author: Elke Heidenreich; Bernd Schroeder
- Language: German
- Genre: Novel
- Publisher: Carl Hanser Verlag
- Publication date: 7 September 2009
- Media type: Hardcover; Audiobook
- ISBN: 978-3-44-623393-5

Alte Liebe (lit. 'Old Love') is a novel in German written jointly by Elke Heidenreich and Bernd Schroeder. It is the story of a couple married in the 1960s, during the German student movement, and together for 40 years, but experiencing differences along the way. It is regarded as a semi-autobiography by two authors who married in 1972 and separated later, but kept up their literary collaboration. Wife and husband tell the story in alternating chapters, each an inner monologue followed by dialogue. The book was published by Carl Hanser Verlag in 2009. The authors narrated an audio edition that appeared the same year.

== History ==
The novel Alte Liebe reflects the lives of a couple, Lore and Harry, married for 40 years. It was written in collaboration by Elke Heidenreich and Bernd Schroeder. The authors are a real-life couple who married in 1972, and separated in 1995 but still worked together afterwards. Their first joint book after their separation was Rudernde Hunde (Rowing dogs) in 2002. Alte Liebe was published by Carl Hanser Verlag in 2009. The authors narrated an audio edition that appeared the same year.

== Structure and synopsis ==
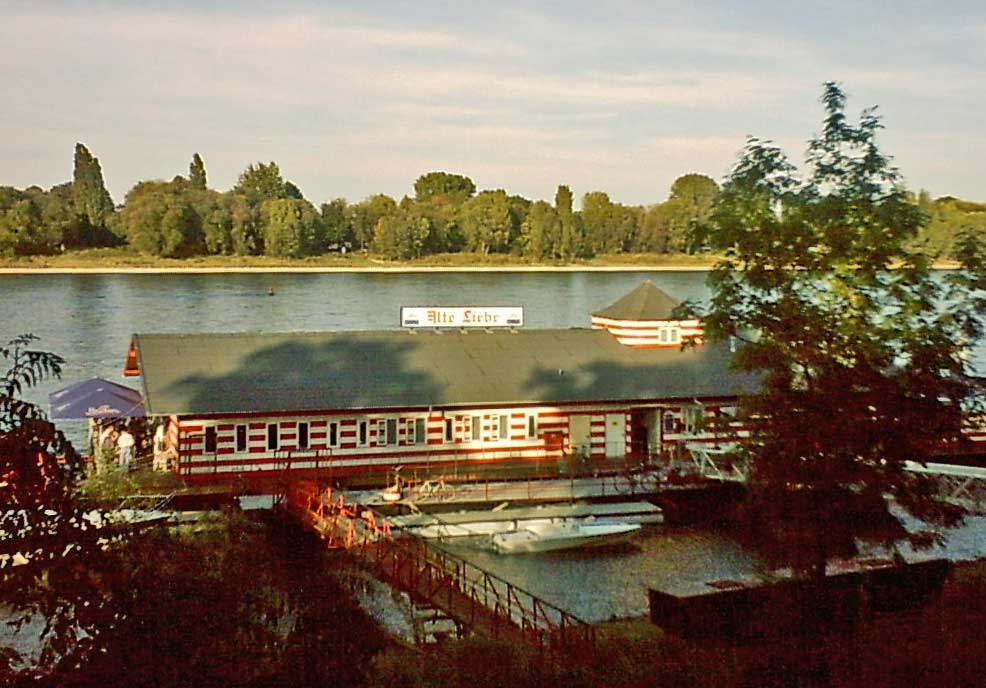
Floating restaurant Alte Liebe, on the Rhine at Rodenkirchen

The main characters are Lore and Harry, a couple married for 40 years, told in alternating chapters by both partners, each chapter first an inner monologue, then a dialogue. The title, translating to "old love", alludes to the German proverb "Alte Liebe rostet nicht." (Old love doesn't rust.). It is also the name of a floating restaurant on the Rhine at Rodenkirchen, where the story is set.

Lore and Harry met in the 1960s and took part in the German student movement. He studied architecture, but instead of creating buildings, worked in a municipal administrative department (Bauamt). When the story begins, he is retired and wants to focus on gardening. She works in a library, especially interested in inviting prominent authors such as Martin Walser to read from their books, and thus meeting them in person. Lore and Harry have an only child, Gloria, who herself has one daughter, Laura. Lore is frustrated that she cannot interest either Harry or Laura in reading, but she is also unhappy about tendencies in literature and the behaviour of authors.

Lore and Harry are invited to Gloria's third wedding, to a wealthy conservative industrialist in Leipzig. They decide to attend the event although they despise the society there, and come to realise that they have more common ground than they thought, despite differences about other subjects.

== Reception ==
Reviewers have regarded the book as a semi-autobiography. A review by the FAZ noted the unbroken fire of the student movement and its criticism of the establishment, rendered with elements of self-irony and witty dialogue. Lore is seen as providing satire and literary quotes from Gottfried Benn and Virginia Woolf, while Harry contributed architectural insights and analysis in the book.
