= The First Polka =

1979 film

- Directed by: Klaus Emmerich
- Written by: Horst Bienek (novel); Helmut Krapp
- Produced by: Lutz Hengst
- Starring: Maria Schell
- Cinematography: Michael Ballhaus
- Edited by: Hannes Nikel
- Release date: 28 February 1979
- Running time: 96 minutes
- Country: West Germany
- Language: German

The First Polka (German: Die erste Polka) is a 1979 West German drama film directed by Klaus Emmerich. It was entered into the 29th Berlin International Film Festival. It is an adaptation of The First Polka: A Novel by Horst Bienek.

== Cast ==
- Maria Schell – Valeska Piontek
- Erland Josephson – Leo Maria Piontek
- Guido Wieland – Montag
- Ernst Stankovski – Wondrak – Anwalt
- Claus Theo Gärtner – Metzmacher – Feldwebel
- René Schell – Josef Piontek
- Marco Kröger – Andreas
- Miriam Geissler – Ulla
- Eva Maria Bauer – Tante Lucie
- Jan Biczycki – Erzpriester Pattas
- Marie Bardischewski – Wassermilka
- Regine Lamster – Irma
- Markus Stolberg – Leutnant Heiko
- Jessica Früh – Halina
- Ursula Strätz – Witwe Zoppas
