= Jörg Graser =

German film director

- Born: 30 December 1951 (age 74); Heidelberg, West Germany
- Occupations: Film director Screenwriter
- Years active: 1981-1997

Jörg Graser (born 30 December 1951) is a German film director and screenwriter. His film Abraham's Gold was screened in the Un Certain Regard section at the 1990 Cannes Film Festival.

== Filmography ==
- Trokadero (dir. Klaus Emmerich, 1981)
- Der Mond ist nur a nackerte Kugel (1981)
- Magdalena (1983, TV film) — (based on a play by Ludwig Thoma)
- Via Mala (dir. Tom Toelle, 1985, TV miniseries) — (based on Via Mala by John Knittel)
- Storms in May (dir. Xaver Schwarzenberger, 1987, TV film) — (based on Storms in May by Ludwig Ganghofer)
- Abraham's Gold (1990)
- Ich schenk dir die Sterne (1991)
- Drei Sekunden Ewigkeit (1995, TV film)
