= Scotty Bloch =

American actress (1925–2018)

- Born: Barbara Belle Scott; January 28, 1925; Pelham, New York, U.S.
- Died: September 15, 2018 (aged 93); Niantic, Connecticut, U.S.
- Occupations: American stage and television actress
- Spouse: Daniel J. Bloch (m. 1948; died 2013)
- Children: 2

Scotty Bloch (born Barbara Belle Scott; January 28, 1925 – September 15, 2018 (Note: "Scotty Bloch Obituary - Old Lyme, CT". Dignity Memorial. 2018.)) was an American stage and television actress.

== Career ==
Bloch worked as an actress since the 1940s. Her television work included playing Lucille O'Brien in the dramatic series Kay O'Brien and a recurring role on Kate and Allie as the mother of Jane Curtin's character. In 1980, she appeared on Broadway in Mark Medoff's Children of a Lesser God, (Note: "Scotty Bloch". Internet Broadway Database. The Broadway League. Archived from the original on 2018-12-08.) at the Longacre Theatre in New York. She also starred in the Oscar and Palme d'Or-winning 1989 short film The Lunch Date, written and directed by Adam Davidson. (Note: "The Lunch Date". Cannes Film Festival. Archived from the original on 2022-05-28.)

== Personal life ==
Bloch married Daniel Bloch in 1948. They remained wed until his death in 2013. They had two sons, Andrew and Anthony.

Bloch died in Niantic, Connecticut at age 93 from Alzheimer's disease.

== Filmography ==
| Year | Title | Role | Notes |
|---|---|---|---|
| 1982 | The King of Comedy | Crockett's Secretary | |
| 1989 | The Lunch Date | Lady | |
| 1990 | A Shock to the System | Secretary #1 | |
| 1990 | The Bonfire of the Vanities | Sally Rawthrote | |
| 1994 | I.Q. | Dinner Guest #2 | |
| 1996 | Everyone Says I Love You | Holden's Mother | |
| 1997 | Deconstructing Harry | Ms. Paley | |
| 1999 | The Out-of-Towners | Florence Needleman | |
| 2000 | Small Time Crooks | Edgar's Wife | |
