= Mario Fischel =

German actor

Mario Fischel (born 29 March 1958) is a German actor. He had a part in the movie David (1979) as the main character. Fischel is also known for Sonntagskinder (1980).
