= David (1979 film) =

- Directed by: Peter Lilienthal
- Written by: Jurek Becker; Peter Lilienthal; Ulla Ziemann; Joel Koenig (novel)
- Produced by: Joachim von Vietinghoff
- Starring: Walter Taub; Irene Vrkijan; Eva Mattes; Mario Fischel
- Cinematography: Al Ruban
- Edited by: Siegrun Jaeger
- Music by: Wojciech Kilar
- Distributed by: Kino International (USA)
- Release date: February 1978 (BIFF)
- Running time: 125 minutes
- Country: West Germany
- Language: German

David is a 1979 West German film by director Peter Lilienthal. It tells the story of a rabbi's son in Germany during the Holocaust, who tries to raise money to escape to Mandate Palestine.

== Summary ==
David follows an adolescent Jewish boy, David Singer, who comes of age in Nazi Berlin. The film reveals the struggles for identity and survival that often overlapped among the Jews of war-torn Europe, particularly the young.

“Father says we must be proud of being Jewish, especially now,” David tells his brother Leo, who tries to camouflage his Jewish identity by wearing a Nazi uniform. But the yellow star that David and his fellow Jews are forced to wear is not a mark of Jewish pride. When Jews’ essential identity became a death sentence in Nazi Germany, its value was called into question for so many Jews who endured the Holocaust.

The film shows the unfolding and progression of the war against the Jews in Germany, as seen from the limited perspective of one young boy. As he navigates through dangerous streets and railway cars, the viewer observes with him the effects of Hitler’s policies on daily life in Berlin and on relations between Jews and non-Jews. The film depicts the gradual but steady removal of the city’s Jews.

The film opens in pre-War Germany, depicting the young protagonist’s experience of the rampant anti-Semitism that would soon grow into the Holocaust. In the first scene, young David is harassed by a group of German schoolchildren who beat him and taunt him with the words “Jew pig.” Later, a communal celebration of Purim — the Jewish holiday that commemorates the saving of the Jews of ancient Persia from extermination — foreshadows the impending war. David’s father, the congregation rabbi, delivers a sermon that describes the attempted annihilation of the Purim story, a grim portent of what is to come. But the scene is a case of dramatic irony: Rabbi Singer is not aware of, or does not want to acknowledge, the relevance of his own words to the situation in early Nazi Germany. When, in the middle of the celebration, a group of Germans march by the synagogue chanting “Jews get out, Jews get out,” he insists that they are in fact only calling out to the city’s youth, that their chant is actually: “Youth come out, youth come out.”

The film is particularly compelling in its depiction of the intimate space of the Singer family and their interactions with one another — marked by love, devotion and the all-too-real fear of imminent loss and separation. When the rabbi is forced to watch his synagogue set aflame by the Nazis, and returns home with a swastika emblazoned on his head, he insists that the important thing is that the family is alive and together.

== Awards ==
In 1979, David won three awards at the 29th Berlin International Film Festival:

- Golden Bear - Peter Lilienthal
- Interfilm Award - Peter Lilienthal
- OCIC Award - Peter Lilenthal

The same year, David won two awards at the German Film Awards:

- Outstanding Individual Achievement - Walter Taub
- Outstanding Feature Film - David

== Cast ==
- Mario Fischel ... David Singer
- Walter Taub ... Rabbi Singer
- Irena Vrkljan ... Frau Singer - David's mother
- Eva Mattes ... Toni
- Dominique Horwitz ... Leo Singer
- Torsten Henties ... David as child
- Gustav Rudolf Sellner ... Dr. Grell (as Rudolph Sellner)
- Erik Jelde (as Eric Jelde)
- Nikolaus Dutsch ... Kohn
- Sabine Andreas ... Rifka
- Buddy Elias
- Golda Tencer
- Vladimir Weigl (as Vladimir Weigel)
- Hanns Zischler (as Johann Zischler)

== Reception ==
David was praised for its recreation of war-time Germany and its tendency towards understatement. The horrors of the Holocaust speak for themselves, not requiring overzealous emotionality from the actors or direction.

== See also ==
- Holocaust survivors
- List of films featuring Berlin
- List of Holocaust films
