= Buch-Geiseldorf =

- Former municipality
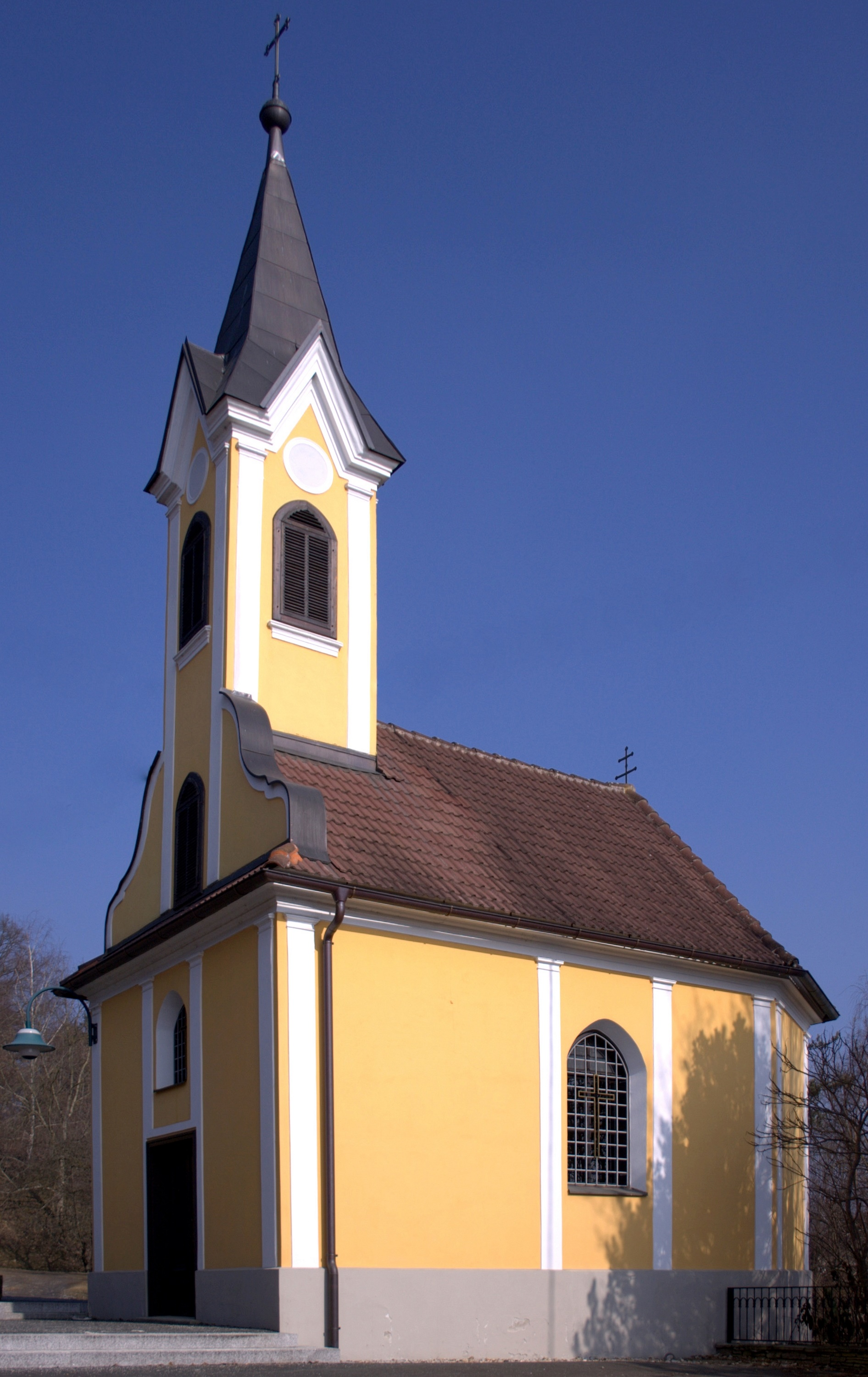
- Chapel in Oberbuch

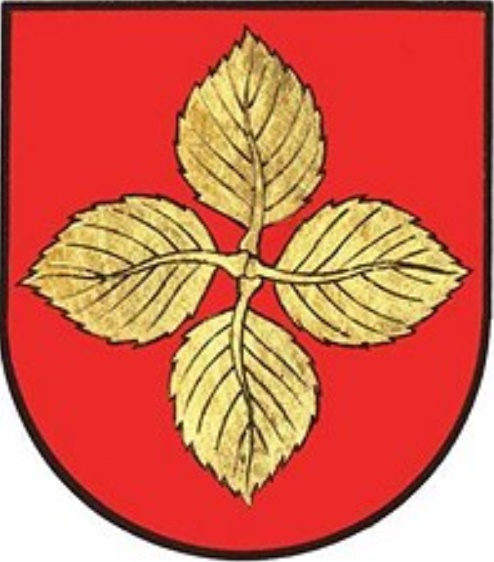
- Coat of arms

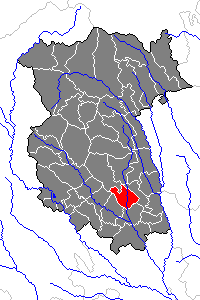
- Location within Hartberg district

- Location within Austria
- Coordinates: 47°14′08″N 15°59′31″E
- Country: Austria
- State: Styria
- District: Hartberg

Area
  - Total: 14.59 km^{2} (5.63 sq mi)
- Elevation: 314 m (1,030 ft)

Population (2015-01-01)
  - Total: 1,031
  - Density: 70.66/km^{2} (183.0/sq mi)
- Time zone: UTC+1 (CET)
  - Summer (DST): UTC+2 (CEST)
- Postal code: 8274, 8272
- Area code: 03332
- Vehicle registration: HB
- Website: www.buch-geiseldorf.at

Buch-Geiseldorf is a former municipality in the district of Hartberg in Styria, Austria. It was united with Sankt Magdalena am Lemberg on January 1, 2013, to form the new municipality Buch-St. Magdalena in Hartberg-Fürstenfeld District.
