= Horst Bienek =

German novelist and poet

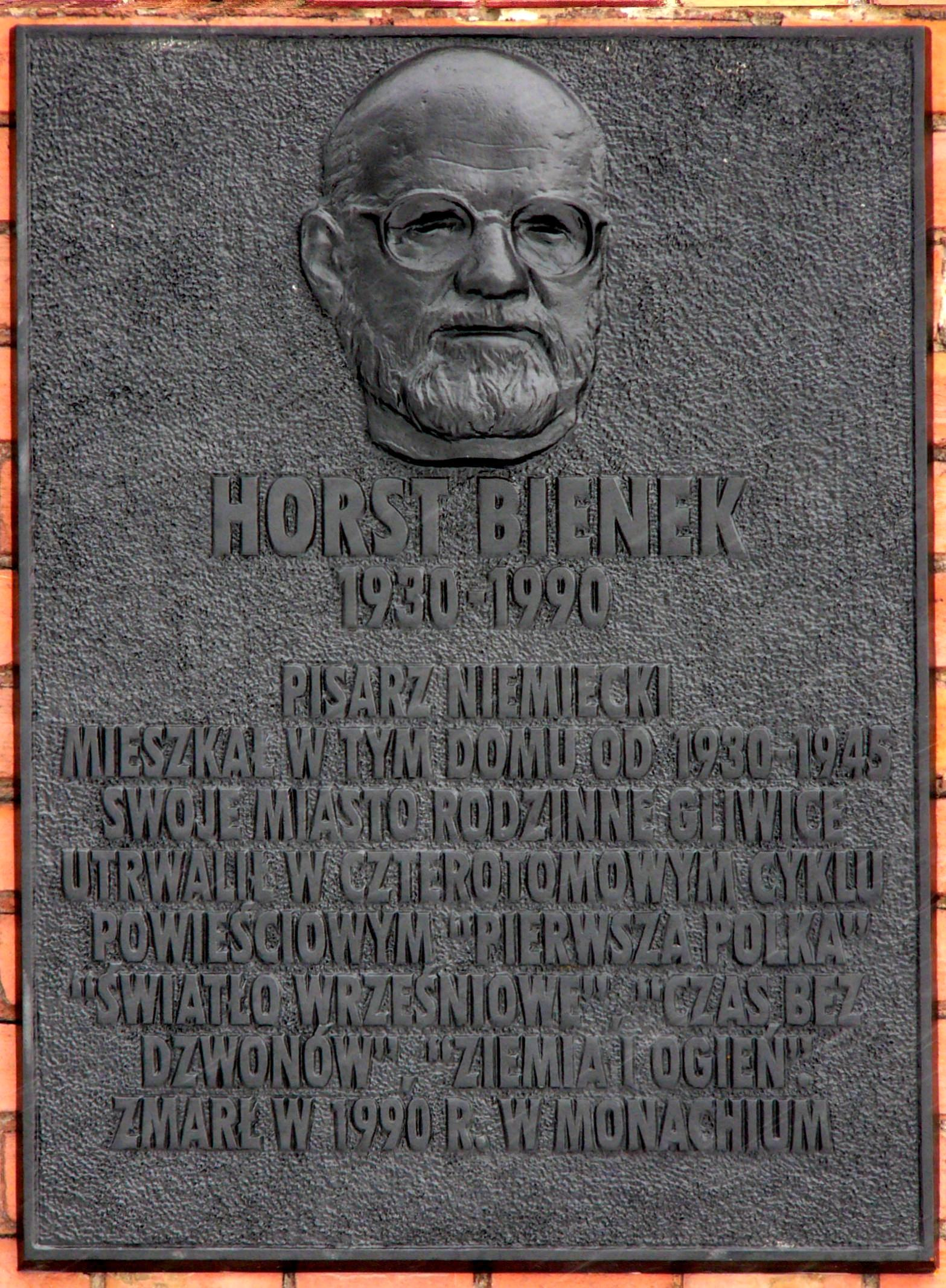
Plaque on the house in which Horst Bienek was born (in Polish)

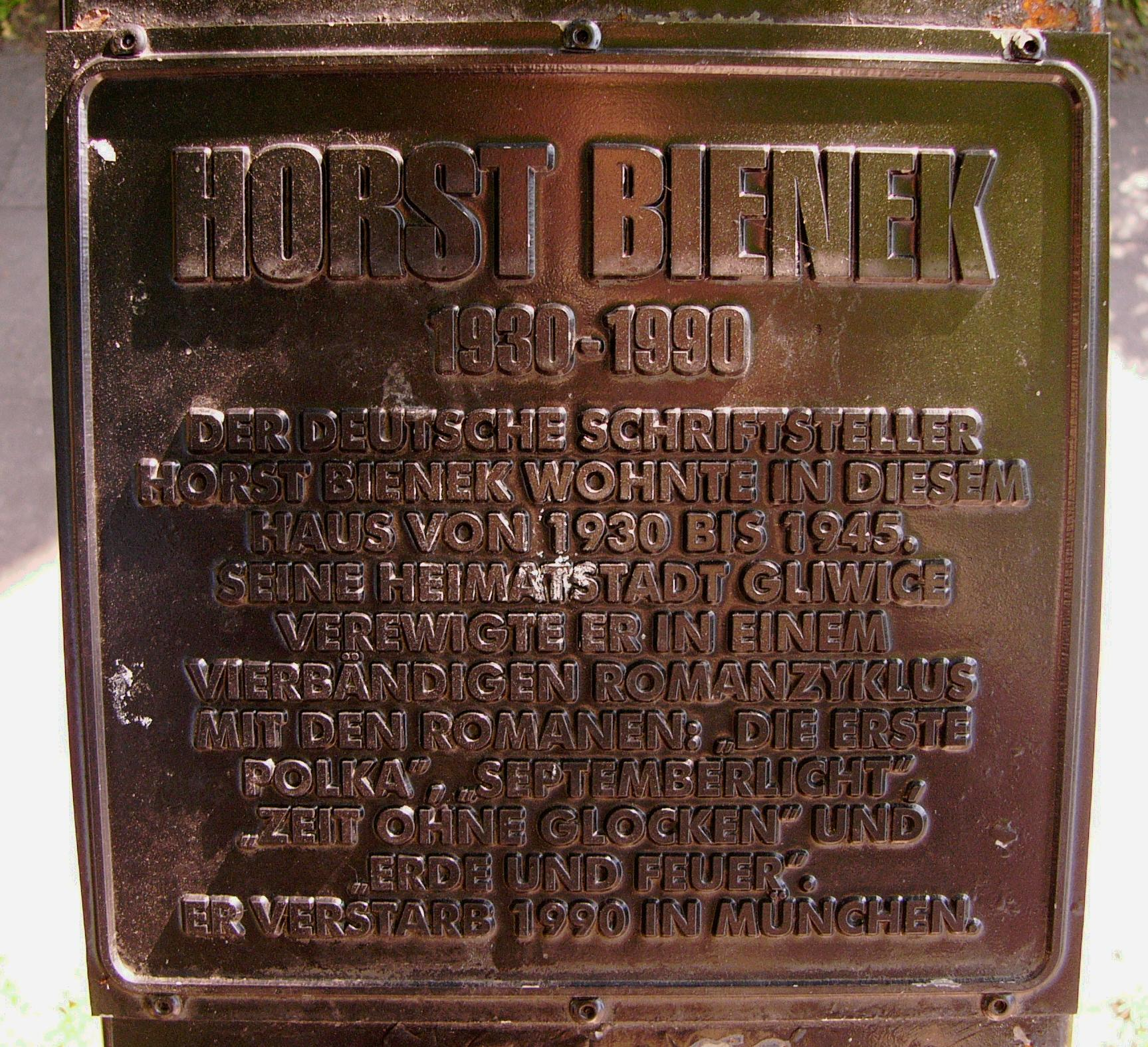
Plaque on the house in which Horst Bienek was born (in German)

Horst Bienek (7 May 1930 in Gleiwitz – 7 December 1990 in Munich) was a German novelist and poet.

== Life ==
Born in Gleiwitz, Upper Silesia, Germany (today Gliwice, Poland), Bienek was forced to leave there in 1945 when Germans were expelled from Silesia. He resettled in the eastern part of Germany. For a time, he was a student of Bertolt Brecht. In 1951, he was arrested by NKVD and sentenced in a show trial to 25 years of labour for "anti-Soviet incitement" and alleged espionage on behalf of the United States, and sent to the Rechlag Gulag labor camp in Vorkuta and later to construction works in Sverdlovsk, Russia. When he was released as the result of an amnesty in 1955, he settled in West Germany. Much of his writing addressed the theme of his uprooting from his Upper Silesian homeland

Although he was homosexual, his autobiographical writings never discussed openly his own homosexuality, and his novels only on occasion allude gently to homosexual attraction.

Bienek died in Munich in 1990 from AIDS.

== Work ==
Bienek was the winner of numerous prizes, including the Nelly Sachs Prize in 1981. His best-known work is the four-volume series of novels dealing with the prelude to World War II and the war itself, Gleiwitz, Eine oberschlesische Chronik in vier Romanen.

Three of his works were adapted for film:

- Die Zelle (1971)
- Die erste Polka (1979)
- Schloß Königswald (1987).

Four of Bienek's novels have been translated into English:

- The First Polka (1978)
- September Light (1986)
- The Cell (1973)
- Time Without Bells (1988)

== See also ==
- Horst-Bienek-Preis für Lyrik, a literary prize named after Bienek
