= Mohamed Zran =

Tunisian film director

- Born: 23 August 1959 (age 66); Zarzis, Tunisia
- Occupations: Film director screenwriter
- Years active: 1986–2004
- Notable work: Le casseur de pierres

Mohamed Zran (born 23 August 1959) is a Tunisian film director and screenwriter. His film Le casseur de pierres was screened in the Un Certain Regard section at the 1990 Cannes Film Festival.

== Filmography ==
=== Director ===
- Virgule (Comma) (1987)
- Le casseur de pierres (The Stone Breaker) (1989)
- Ya nabil (Hey Nabil) by Mohamed Zran and Martine Robert (1993)
- Essaïda (1996)
- Le chant du millénaire (The song of the millennia) (2002)
- Le prince (2004)
- Living here (2009)
- Dégage! (2012)
- Lilia, a Tunisian Girl (2016)

=== Actor ===
- Alger, The White by Cyril Collard as Muhammed (1986)
- Bye Bye by Karim Dridi (1995)
- The Prince by Martha Coolidge (2005)
