= The Transformation of the World into Music =

1994 film

The Transformation of the World Into Music (German: Die Verwandlung der Welt in Musik - Bayreuth vor der Premiere) is a 1994 German documentary film directed by Werner Herzog. The film is about the Bayreuth Festival and Richard Wagner's operas, in particular The Flying Dutchman, Parsifal, Tristan und Isolde. The film was conceived as an introductory work "to a series of opera broadcasts on German television".

== Content ==
Herzog's official website describes The Transformation of the World Into Music as "a personal portrait and backstage view of the Richard-Wagner-Festival in Bayreuth and the mysteries of opera"'
