= Mimi Vang Olsen =

American painter

Mimi Vang Olsen is a New York-born painter specializing in pet portraits in The Village since the early 1970s. Her work has brought her international recognition and celebrity clientele.

== Family ==
Olsen was born in the Bronx. Her parents were immigrants from Hungary and Armenia. Her father was a photographer and her mother was a textile designer. Her husband, Bent, is Danish.

== Artistry ==
It is estimated that Vang Olsen has painted close to 400 pet and family portraits over her decades-long career. "I approach it as if it were a formal portrait of a person or a piece of fruit", Vang Olsen said. "It could be a still life. And by analyzing the pet's personality, dog or cat, you can figure out how to do a beautiful portrait." She only paints pets that are alive so she can visit the pet and learn its personality for the portrait.

Vang Olsen's artwork can be seen in most card stores, with profits from calendars and cards going to The Humane Society of New York.
