= Sankt Magdalena am Lemberg =

- Former municipality
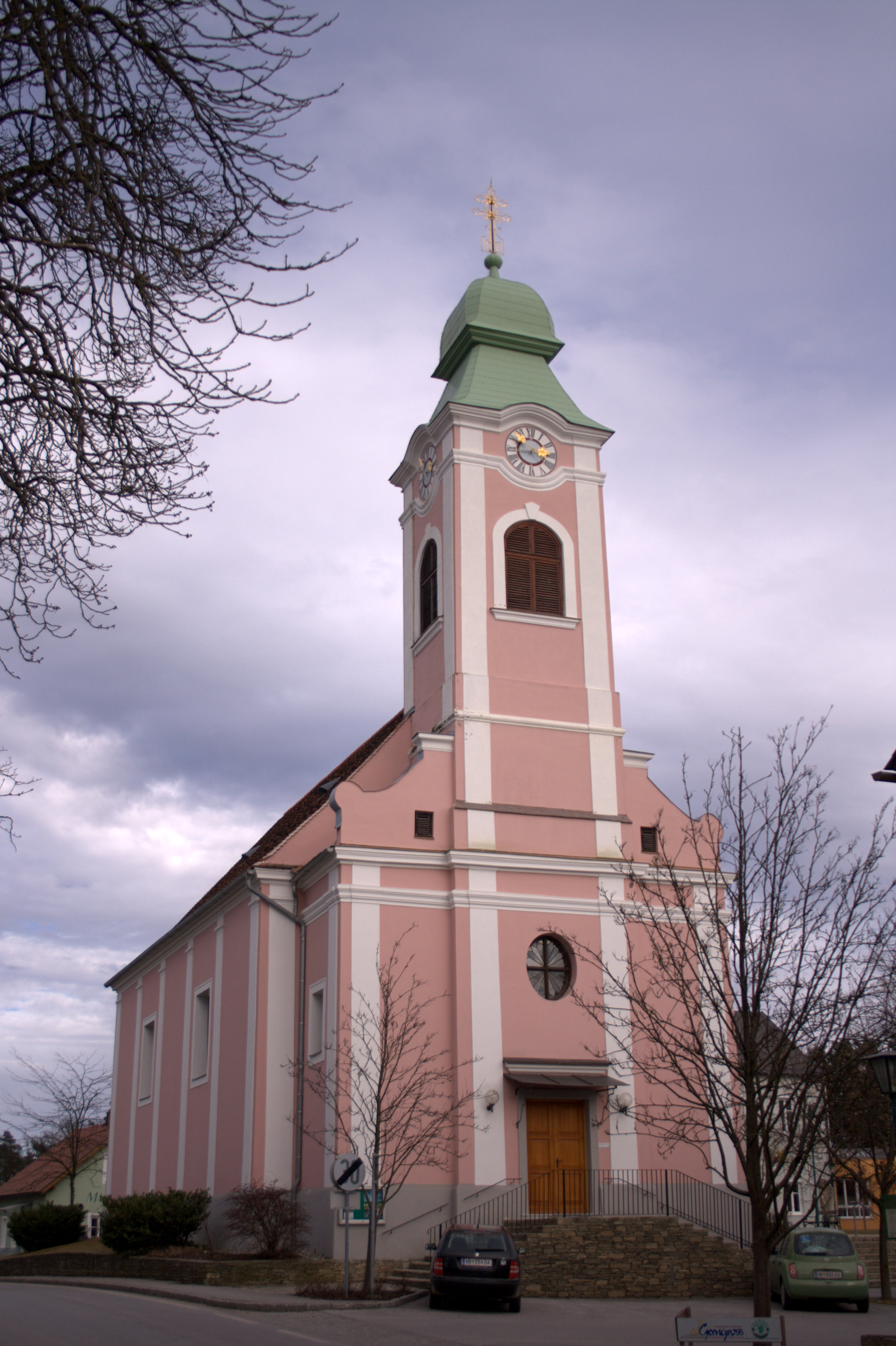
- Sankt Magdalena parish church

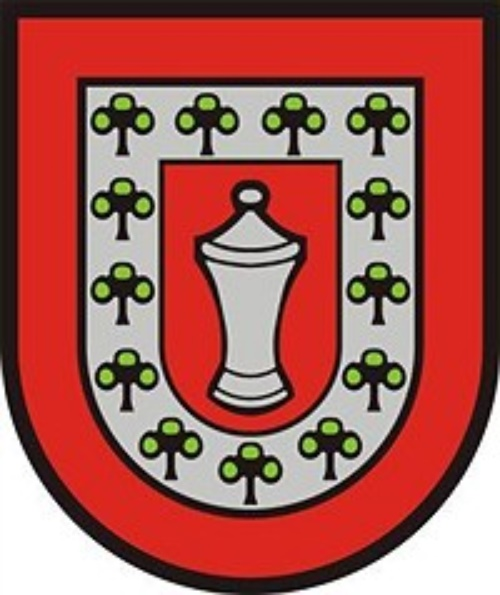
- Coat of arms

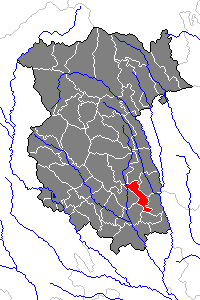
- Location within Hartberg district

- Location within Austria
- Coordinates: 47°13′26″N 16°01′41″E
- Country: Austria
- State: Styria
- District: Hartberg-Fürstenfeld

Area
  - Total: 4.66 km^{2} (1.80 sq mi)
- Elevation: 430 m (1,410 ft)

Population (2012-01-01)
  - Total: 1,131
  - Density: 243/km^{2} (629/sq mi)
- Time zone: UTC+1 (CET)
  - Summer (DST): UTC+2 (CEST)
- Postal code: 8274 Buch, 8294 Unterrohr
- Area code: 03332
- Vehicle registration: HB
- Website: www.st-magdalena-lemberg.steiermark.at

Sankt Magdalena am Lemberg is a former municipality in the district of Hartberg in Styria, Austria. It was united with Buch-Geiseldorf on 1 January 2013 to form the new municipality Buch-St. Magdalena in Hartberg-Fürstenfeld District.
