= Swan Lake: The Zone =

1989 film directed by Yuri Ilyenko

Swan Lake: The Zone is a 1989 Soviet film directed by Yuri Ilyenko.

== Synopsis ==
Three days before the end of his sentence, a man escapes from prison. He takes refuge in the pedestal of a rusty roadside monument, the Hammer and Sickle, where a Woman finds him. They fall in love with each other, and the Woman even buys train tickets for herself, her son and the Man to leave. However, on this day, workers come to paint the monument, and the Man is returned to prison.

Once back in the zone, the Man drinks the paint and later dies in the hospital. The ensign carries his body on a cart to the morgue, including passing the monument and the woman who is waiting there. The morgue worker drinks with the ensign on the occasion of Easter and notices that the Man is not dead. She gives a blood transfusion from Warrant Officer to Man. The next morning, the ensign tries to leave, but collapses in the cart. The man brings him to the zone, ending up there again. After some time, it becomes known that his sentence will not be increased due to his escape, and one of these days he will be released. However, the zone authorities threaten that he will not leave the zone alive, because the blood of the “shepherd dog” (that is, the guard) now flows in him. The night before his release, the man commits suicide. The woman continues to wait for him near the monument.
