= Herschel Grynszpan =

Assassin of Ernst vom Rath (1921–1945?)

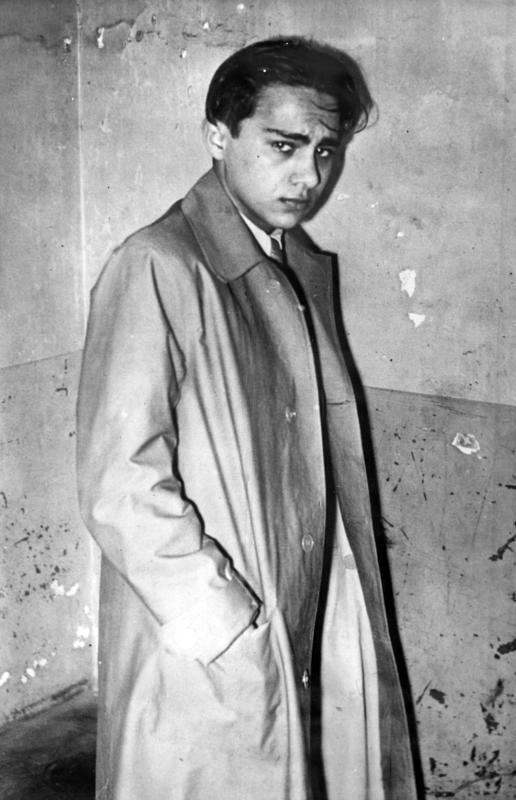
- Grynszpan after his arrest, 1938
- Born: Herschel Feibel Grynszpan; 28 March 1921; Hanover, Germany
- Disappeared: 18 August 1944 (aged 23); Magdeburg, Germany
- Status: Declared dead by 8 May 1945 in absentia, on: 1 June 1960; exact date of potential death unknown
- Citizenship: Polish (1921–1938); Stateless (since 1938)

Herschel Feibel Grynszpan (Yiddish: הערשל פײַבל גרינשפּאן; German: Hermann Grünspan; 28 March 1921 – last rumoured to be alive in 1945, declared dead in 1960) was a Polish-Jewish expatriate born and raised in Weimar Germany who shot the Nazi German diplomat Ernst vom Rath on November 7, 1938 in Paris. The Nazis used this assassination as a pretext to launch Kristallnacht, "The Night of Broken Glass", the pogrom of 9–10 November 1938. Grynszpan was seized by the Gestapo after the Fall of France and brought to Germany; his further fate remains unknown.

It is generally assumed that Grynszpan did not survive World War II, and he was declared dead in absentia by the West German government in 1960. This was done at the request of his parents, (Note: They survived the war by evacuating from Poland to the USSR when Germany invaded. The family later moved to Mandatory Palestine.) who said they had not heard anything from him in over 15 years, which was out of character for him. However, this remains a matter of dispute: Kurt Grossman claimed in 1957 that Grynszpan lived in Paris under another identity. A photograph of a man resembling Grynszpan was cited in 2016 as evidence to support the claim that he was still alive in Bamberg, Germany, on 3 July 1946.

== Early years ==
Grynszpan was born on 28 March 1921 in Hanover, Germany. His parents, Zindel and Rivka, were Polish Jews who had emigrated in 1911 and settled in Hanover. Zindel opened a tailor's shop, from which he earned a modest living. Because of the German Citizenship Law of 1913, based on the principles of jus sanguinis, Grynszpan was never a German citizen despite his birth in Germany. The family became Polish citizens after the First World War and retained that status during their years in Germany. Grynszpan was the youngest of six children, only three of whom survived childhood. His parents' first child was stillborn in 1912. Their second child, daughter Sophie Helena (born in 1914), died of scarlet fever in 1928. A daughter (Esther, also known as "Berta") was born on 31 January 1916 (the Nazis murdered her in 1942 or 1943), and a son (Mordechai) on 29 August 1919. A fifth child, Salomone, was born in 1920 and died in 1931 in a road accident.

The Grynszpan family was known as Ostjuden ("Eastern Jews") by the Germans and many West European Jews. The "Ostjuden" usually spoke Yiddish and tended to be more religiously observant, impoverished, and less educated. Herschel dropped out of school at age 14. Grynszpan was considered by his teachers to be intelligent, if rather lazy, a student who never seemed to try to excel at his studies. He later complained that his teachers disliked him because he was an Ostjude, and he was treated as an outcast by his German teachers and fellow students. As a child and a teenager, Grynszpan was known for his violent temper and his tendency to respond to antisemitic insults with his fists and was frequently suspended from school for fighting.

== Paris ==
Grynszpan attended a state primary school until 1935 (when he was 14) and later said that he left school because Jewish students were already facing discrimination. He was an intelligent, sensitive and easily-provoked youth whose few close friends found him too touchy. Grynszpan was an active member of the Jewish youth sports club, Bar-Kochba Hanover. When he left school, his parents decided that there was no future for him in Germany and tried to arrange for his emigration to the British Mandate of Palestine. With financial assistance from Hanover's Jewish community, Grynszpan was sent to a yeshiva (rabbinical seminary) in Frankfurt and studied Hebrew and the Torah; he was, by all accounts, more religious than his parents. After eleven months, he left the yeshiva, returned to Hanover and applied to emigrate to Palestine. The local Palestine emigration office told Grynszpan that he was too young and would have to wait a year. He and his parents decided that he should go to Paris and live with his uncle and aunt, Abraham and Chawa Grynszpan, instead. Grynszpan obtained a Polish passport and German residence permit and received permission to leave Germany and go to Belgium, where another uncle (Wolf Grynszpan) lived. He did not intend to remain in Belgium and entered France illegally in September 1936. (Grynszpan could not enter France legally because he had no financial support; Jews were not permitted to take money from Germany.)

In Paris, he lived in a small Yiddish-speaking enclave of Polish Orthodox Jews. Grynszpan met few people outside it, learning only a few words of French in two years. He initially lived a carefree, bohemian life as a "poet of the streets", spending his days aimlessly wandering and reciting Yiddish poems to himself. Grynszpan's two greatest interests, other than exploring Paris, were spending time in coffeehouses and going to the cinema. He spent this period unsuccessfully trying to become a legal resident of France because he could neither work nor study legally. Grynszpan's German re-entry permit expired in April 1937 and his Polish passport expired in January 1938, leaving him without papers. The Paris Police Prefecture ruled in July 1937 that he had no basis for remaining in France, and he was ordered to leave the following month. Grynszpan had no desire to return to Germany. In March 1938, Poland passed a law depriving Polish citizens who had lived continuously abroad for more than five years of their citizenship. Grynszpan became a stateless person as a result, and continued to live illegally in Paris. Lonely and living in poverty on the margins of French life as an illegal immigrant, with no real skills, he grew increasingly desperate and angry as his situation worsened.

Grynszpan was afraid to accept a job because of his illegal immigrant status and depended for support on his uncle Abraham, who was also extremely poor. His refusal to work caused tension with his uncle and aunt, who frequently told him that he was a drain on their finances and had to take a job despite the risk of deportation. Beginning in October 1938 Grynszpan was in hiding from the French police who sought to deport him, a stressful situation. The few who knew him in Paris described him as a shy, emotional teenager who often wept when he discussed the plight of Jews around the world, especially his beloved family in Germany. Grynszpan came from a close-knit, loving family, and often spoke about his love for his family and how much he missed them.

== From exile to assassin ==
The position of Grynszpan's family in Hanover was becoming increasingly precarious; his father's business was failing, and both of his siblings lost their jobs. German authorities announced in August 1938, in response to a Polish decree stripping Polish Jews living abroad of citizenship, that all residence permits for foreigners were being cancelled and would have to be renewed. On 26 October, a few days before the decree was to come into force, the Gestapo was ordered to arrest and deport all Polish Jews in Germany. The Grynszpan family was among the estimated 12,000 Polish Jews arrested, stripped of their property, and herded aboard trains headed for Poland. At the trial of Adolf Eichmann, Sendel Grynszpan recounted their deportation during the night of 27 October 1938: "Then they took us in police trucks, in prisoners' lorries, about 20 men in each truck, and they took us to the railway station. The streets were full of people shouting: "Juden raus! Raus nach Palästina!" ("Out with the Jews! Off to Palestine!")

When the deportees reached the border, they were forced to walk 2 kilometres (1 1/4 miles) to the Polish town of Zbąszyń. Poland refused to admit them at first, since the Sanation government had no intention of accepting those whom it had just stripped of Polish citizenship. The "Polish operation" (German: die Polenaktion) ended on 29 October, when the Polish government threatened to begin expelling German nationals from Poland. The Grynszpans and thousands of other Polish-Jewish deportees stranded at the border were fed by the Polish Red Cross.

Conditions for the refugees, trapped in the open on the German-Polish frontier, were extremely poor; according to a British woman who worked with the Red Cross, "I found thousands crowded together in pigsties. The old, the sick and children herded together in the most inhumane conditions ... some actually tried to escape back to Germany and were shot". On 3 November, Grynszpan received a postcard from his sister in Zbąszyn dated 31 October recounting what had happened and (in a line which was crossed out) apparently pleading for help. On 6 November 1938, Grynszpan asked his uncle Abraham to send money to his family. Abraham said he had little to spare and was incurring financial costs and legal risks by harbouring his nephew, an illegal immigrant and unemployed youth. After an argument, Grynszpan walked out of his uncle's house with about 300 francs (an average day's wage in Paris at the time) and spent the night in a cheap hotel. On the morning of 7 November, he wrote a farewell postcard to his parents and put it in his pocket. Grynszpan went to a gun shop in the Rue du Faubourg St Martin, where he bought a 6.35 mm revolver and a box of 25 bullets for 235 francs. He caught the metro to the Solférino station and walked to the German embassy at 78 Rue de Lille (Paris). It is generally believed that Grynszpan wanted to assassinate Johannes von Welczeck, the German ambassador to France. As he entered the embassy Grynszpan walked past von Welczeck, who was leaving for his daily morning walk. At 9:45 am, Grynszpan identified himself as a German resident at the reception desk and asked to see an embassy official; he did not ask for anyone by name. He claimed to be a spy with important intelligence which he had to give to the most senior diplomat available, preferably the ambassador. Unaware that he had just walked past von Welczeck, Grynszpan asked if he could see "His Excellency, the ambassador" to hand over the "most important document" he claimed to have. The clerk on duty asked Ernst vom Rath, the junior of the two embassy officials available, to see him. When Grynszpan entered vom Rath's office, vom Rath asked to see the "most important document". Grynszpan pulled out his gun, and shot him five times in the abdomen. According to the French police account, he shouted right before pulling out his gun: "You're a filthy boche! In the name of 12,000 persecuted Jews, here is the document!"

Grynszpan made no attempt to resist or escape, and identified himself truthfully to the French police. He confessed to shooting vom Rath (who was in critical condition in a hospital), and repeated that his motive was to avenge the persecuted Jews. In his pocket was the postcard to his parents; it read, "With God's help. My dear parents, I could not do otherwise, may God forgive me, the heart bleeds when I hear of your tragedy and that of the 12,000 Jews. I must protest so that the whole world hears my protest, and that I will do. Forgive me. Hermann [his German name]".

== Aftermath ==
Despite the efforts of French and German doctors (including Adolf Hitler's personal physician, Karl Brandt), the 29-year-old Rath died on 9 November. He received a state funeral in Düsseldorf on 17 November, which was attended by Hitler and by Foreign Minister Joachim von Ribbentrop. In his eulogy, Ribbentrop called the shooting an attack by Jews on the German people, "We understand the challenge, and we accept it." Rath had died on the fifteenth anniversary of the 1923 Beer Hall Putsch, the greatest holiday of the Nazi calendar. That evening, Propaganda Minister Joseph Goebbels – after consulting with Hitler – made an inflammatory speech to an audience of veteran Nazis from throughout Germany at the Bürgerbräukeller beer hall in Munich, where the putsch had been organised. It would not be surprising, Goebbels said, if the German people were so outraged by the assassination of a German diplomat by a Jew that they took the law into their own hands and attacked Jewish businesses, community centres and synagogues.

It was determined that such "spontaneous outbursts" should not be openly organised by the Nazi Party or the Sturmabteilung (SA) but should not be opposed or prevented either. Goebbels' diary entry for that day indicates that Rath's death was a pretext for the pogroms: "In the afternoon the death of the German diplomat Rath is announced. That's good ... I go to the Party reception in the old Rathaus. Terrific activity. I brief Hitler on the affair. He decides: allow the demonstrations to go on. Withdraw the police. The Jews should feel the people's fury. That's right. I issue appropriate instructions to the police and party. Then I give a brief speech on the subject to the Party's leadership. Thunderous applause. Everyone dashed to the telephone. Now the people will act."

Within hours, a Nazi pogrom against Jewish communities began throughout Germany, lasting all night and into the following day. More than 90 Jews were killed; over 30,000 Jews were arrested and sent to concentration camps (where more than a thousand died before the remainder were released, several months later) and thousands of Jewish shops, homes and offices, along with more than 200 synagogues, were smashed or burned.

More than a billion Reichsmarks in property damage (about US$400 million at the time, or $8.93 billion in 2024 dollars) was reported. Although Jews were able to file insurance claims for their property losses, Hermann Göring (in charge of German economic planning) ruled that the claims would not be paid. Kristallnacht shocked the world, and helped end the climate of support for the appeasement of Hitler in Britain, France and the United States. It also triggered a new wave of Jewish emigration from Germany.

Grynszpan was distraught when he learned that his action was used by the Nazis to justify further violent assaults on Jewish Germans, although his family (having been deported to the Polish border) was safe from that latest manifestation of Nazi antisemitism. The Nazi government had been planning violence against Jews for some time, and was waiting for a pretext.

== Legal defence ==
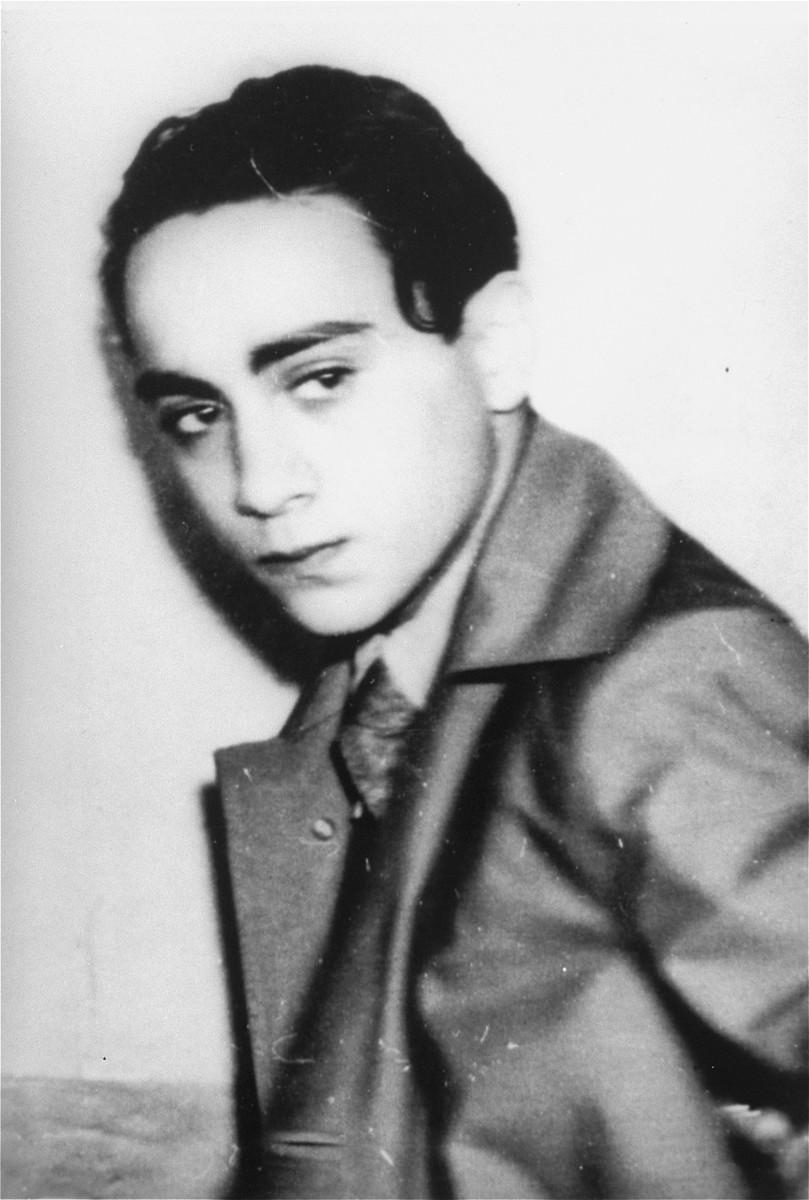
Grynszpan after his arrest by French police

Vom Rath's death and the horror of Kristallnacht brought Grynszpan international notoriety. Enjoying his celebrity status, he was frequently interviewed in his prison cell and wrote letters to celebrities around the world.

Dorothy Thompson, the American journalist, made an impassioned 14 November broadcast to an estimated five million listeners in defence of Grynszpan and noted that the Nazis had made heroes of the assassins of Austrian Chancellor Engelbert Dollfuss and German-Jewish Foreign Minister Walther Rathenau:

I am speaking of this boy. Soon he will go on trial. The news is that on top of all this terror, this horror, one more must pay. They say he will go to the guillotine, without a trial by jury, with the rights that any common murderer has... Who is on trial in this case? I say we are all on trial. I say the men of Munich are on trial, who signed a pact without one word of protection for helpless minorities. Whether Herschel Grynszpan lives or not won't matter much to Herschel. He was prepared to die when he fired those shots. His young life was already ruined. Since then, his heart has been broken into bits by the results of his deed. They say a man is entitled to a trial by a jury of his peers, and a man's kinsmen rally around him, when he is in trouble. But no kinsman of Herschel's can defend him. The Nazi government has announced that if any Jews, anywhere in the world, protest at anything that is happening, further oppressive measures will be taken. They are holding every Jew in Germany as a hostage. Therefore, we who are not Jews must speak, speak our sorrow and indignation and disgust in so many voices that they will be heard. This boy has become a symbol, and the responsibility for his deed must be shared by those who caused it.

Liberal and left-wing newspapers and commentators in a number of countries echoed Thompson's sentiments. Deploring Rath's assassination, they said that Grynszpan had been driven to his act by the Nazi persecution of German Jews in general and his family in particular. Jewish organizations were horrified by Grynszpan's action, which they condemned more severely than most non-Jewish liberals (while echoing the plea of extenuating circumstances and condemning the subsequent attacks on all German Jews in response to the act of an isolated individual). The World Jewish Congress "deplored the fatal shooting of an official of the German Embassy by a young Polish Jew of seventeen", but "protested energetically against the violent attacks in the German press against the whole of Judaism because of this act" and "reprisals taken against the German Jews". In France, the Alliance Israélite Universelle "rejected all forms of violence, regardless of author or victim" but "indignantly protested against the barbarous treatment inflicted on an entire innocent population."

Several appeals were launched to raise money for Grynszpan's defence. In the United States, Thompson launched an appeal which raised more than $40,000 in a few weeks. She asked Jews not to donate to the fund so the Nazis could not attribute Grynszpan's defence to a Jewish conspiracy, although Jewish organizations also raised money despite this. In the immediate aftermath of Rath's assassination, two Parisian Jewish lawyers (Szwarc and Vésinne-Larue) were retained by the Grynszpan family. When the case became internationally known, the family sought a well-known lawyer and retained Isidore Franckel (28 November 1893 – 16 February 1965) (one of Paris's leading advocates and president of the central committee of Hatzohar, the Union of Revisionist Zionists). Thompson would later intercede with President Roosevelt to help Franckel and his family (wife and two sons) to flee France to the United States in 1942.

Franckel wanted a well-known non-Jewish lawyer as co-counsel and engaged Vincent de Moro-Giafferi (a flamboyant Corsican, leading anti-fascist activist and former education minister in Édouard Herriot's Radical government), with Yiddish-speaking lawyer Serge Weill-Goudchaux as his associate. Legal fees and expenses were paid from Thompson's fund for Grynszpan's defence. Until Franckel and Moro-Giafferi took over his defence, it was accepted that Grynszpan went to the Embassy in a rage and shot the first German he saw as a political act to avenge the persecution of his family and all German Jews. His statements after his arrest supported this view; he told the Paris police, "Being a Jew is not a crime. I am not a dog. I have a right to live and the Jewish people have a right to exist on this earth. Wherever I have been, I have been chased like an animal." Franckel and Moro-Giafferi said that if Grynszpan was allowed to claim that he had shot Rath with such a motive, he would certainly be convicted and possibly executed (despite his being a minor); French law took a severe view of political assassination. If the crime could be shown to have a non-political motive, he might be acquitted or receive a lesser sentence; French law traditionally took a lenient view of crimes of passion. Moro-Gaifferi's legal strategy depoliticized Grynszpan's actions. Grynszpan was enraged by his lawyer's proposed crime passionel defense, insisting that he was not homosexual and had killed Rath as an act of political protest against the German government's antisemitic policies. The shy, socially-awkward Grynszpan confided to Moro-Giafferi that he had never had a girlfriend and was still a virgin, asking his lawyer to arrange a sexual encounter with a beautiful French girl in case he was sentenced to death. Grynszpan considered himself a hero who stood up to the Nazis, and believed that when his case went to trial his (preferred) "Jewish avenger" defense would acquit him. The outcome of the Schwartzbard trial in 1927, when Sholom Schwartzbard was acquitted for assassinating Symon Petliura in 1926 on the grounds that he was avenging pogroms by Ukrainian forces, was a major factor in Grynszpan's seeking the "Jewish avenger" defense (to Moro-Giafferi's chagrin).

== Sexual orientation ==
Grynszpan was theorized to have been acquainted with Rath before the shooting. According to this theory, Rath was homosexual and had met Grynszpan in Le Boeuf sur le Toit (a Paris bar). It is unclear whether Grynszpan himself was alleged to be homosexual or simply using his youth and appearance to win an influential friend. According to the theory, Rath had promised to use his influence to legalize Grynszpan's French residency. When Rath reneged on his promise, Grynszpan went to the embassy and shot him.

According to a 2001 article in The Guardian, historian Hans-Jürgen Döscher planned to publish an updated edition of his Reichskristallnacht which indicated that Grynszpan and Rath had had a sexual relationship. He alleged that Rath was nicknamed "Mrs Ambassador" and "Notre Dame de Paris" as a result of his homosexual activities. Döscher quoted the diaries of French author André Gide, who wrote that Rath "had an exceptionally intimate relationship with the little Jew, his murderer": "The idea that such a highly thought-of representative of the Third Reich sinned twice according to the laws of his country is rather amusing." However, Swiss-Canadian writer Corinne Chaponnière wrote in a 2015 essay that the quotation was incorrectly attributed to Gide. Döscher claims, in 2000, that by 1941, both the Ministry of Justice and the Reich Security Main Office were aware that Ernst vom Rath was apparently active in Paris's homosexual circles and had likely met Herschel Grynszpan there.

No firm evidence exists that Rath and Grynszpan had met before the shooting. German embassy officials were certain that Grynszpan had not asked for Rath by name, and saw Rath only because he happened to be on duty at the time. In the Sachsenhausen concentration camp in 1941, Grynszpan told fellow inmates that he intended to falsely claim at his trial that he had had a homosexual relationship with Rath. Canadian historian Michael Marrus wrote,

The origin of the story of homosexuality was the defendant's French attorney, Maitre Moro-Giafferi. He claimed in 1947 that he simply invented the story as a possible line of defence, one that would put the affair in an entirely new light. In fact, however, rumours about Rath's homosexuality were in the air in Paris immediately after the assassination. Whatever the origins of the story, its utility was obvious: the murder could be presented not as a political act but as a crime passionel – a lover's quarrel, in which the German diplomat could be judged incidentally as having seduced a minor. Moro-Giafferi shared the fears of the Grynszpan committee at the time of Kristallnacht that a political trial would be a catastrophe for the Jews of Germany and elsewhere. By adopting this legal strategy, they hoped to defuse the affair and also reduce the penalty drastically, possibly even prompting a suspended sentence.

Further evidence is presented by Gerald Schwab in the form of a letter sent to Rath's brother in 1964 by Erich Wollenberg, a communist exile from Nazi Germany who claimed to be an associate of Moro-Giafferi:

One day, and unless I am mistaken it was in the spring of 1939, I met Moro-Giafferi on Boulevard St. Michel, and I asked him for news of Grunspahn [sic] for whom he was the defence lawyer. He had just come from visiting him in his cell, and was revolted by the attitude of his client. "That young man is a fool, infatuated with himself", he said. "He refuses to give a non-political character to his act by saying for example that he assassinated Rath because he had had money quarrels with him following homosexual relations. Yet, such an attitude in regard to the murder of Rath is necessary, in order to save the Jews of the Third Reich, whose lives are becoming more and more precarious in regard to the prosperity, their health, their futures, etc. If only ... he would deny the political motives of his crime, and assert that he had only personal vengeance in mind, vengeance as a victim of homosexuality, the Nazis would lose their best pretext for exercising their reprisals against the German Jews who are victims of his fit of madness and now, of his obstinacy." I asked him if Grunspahn really had had relations with Rath. He replied, "Absolutely not!" I said to him then, "But as a defender of Gruhnspahn [sic] shouldn't you protect not only the interests of your client, but his honour as well?" It was at that moment that Moro-Giafferi exclaimed, "Honour! Honour! What is the honour of that absurd little Jew in the face of the criminal action of Hitler? What does the honour of Grunspahn [sic] weigh in the face of the destiny of thousands of Jews?"

On the eve of the 75th anniversary of Kristallnacht, in November 2013, Dutch author Sidney Smeets published a book based on previously-inaccessible archival sources. The book, De wanhoopsdaad: hoe een zeventienjarige jongen de Kristallnacht ontketende (An Act of Desperation: how a seventeen-year-old boy unleashed Kristallnacht), delves into the court files of German journalist Michael Soltikow's defamation trials during the 1950s and 1960s. Soltikow was sued by Rath's surviving brother in 1952 for libeling his brother, and the evidence Soltikow presented to support his claims of a homosexual relationship between Rath and Grynszpan did not hold up in a court of law. All witnesses, even those quoted to the contrary by Soltikow, denied knowledge of the alleged relationship under oath. According to Smeets, Döscher's theory is untenable since it is based almost entirely on Soltikow's allegations; Grynszpan and Rath did not know each other, and there is no evidence that either was homosexual.

== Paris to Berlin ==
From November 1938 to June 1940, Grynszpan was imprisoned in the Fresnes Prison in Paris while legal arguments continued over the conduct of his trial. His defence team attempted to delay the trial as long as possible on procedural grounds in the hope that the publicity surrounding the Rath murder would subside (making the trial less politicized), with no opposition from the prosecution. Goebbels sent Wolfgang Diewerge, a lawyer and journalist who had joined the NSDAP in 1930, to represent the German government in Paris. Friedrich Grimm (a prominent German lawyer and a professor of international law at the University of Münster) was also sent to Paris, ostensibly representing the Rath family, but was widely known to be an agent of Goebbels. Grimm tried to argue that Grynszpan should be extradited to Germany (although he was not a German citizen), but the French government would not agree to this. Grimm and Diewerge knew each other well, working closely together in the 1934 Cairo Jew Trial, and their efforts in Paris in 1938-39 largely repeated their work in Cairo. The Germans argued that Grynszpan had acted as the agent of a Jewish conspiracy, and their fruitless efforts to find evidence to support this further delayed the trial. Grimm and Diewerge, who were both antisemitic, were obsessed by the belief that Grynszpan had acted on behalf of unknown Jewish Hintermänner (supporters) who were also responsible for the assassination of Wilhelm Gustloff by David Frankfurter in 1936. Their attempts to find the Hintermänner and link Grynszpan to Frankfurter slowed the case; neither man would accept the contentions of the Paris police that the Hintermänner did not exist and the killings of Rath and Gustloff were unrelated. According to American historian Alan Steinweis, the lack of evidence for these Hintermänner did not lead Grimm and Diewerge to the conclusion that they did not exist; instead, they believed that the Jewish conspiracy against Germany was more insidious than they had realized (erasing all evidence of its existence).

Moro-Giafferi changed tactics and demanded an immediate trial when war broke out, confident that anti-German sentiment and German inability to present evidence would result in Grynszpan's acquittal. The investigating judge had joined the army, however; the Ministry of Justice did not want the trial to proceed, and the Swiss lawyer engaged by the Germans employed a number of delaying tactics. The trial had not begun and Grynszpan was still in prison when the German army approached Paris in June 1940. French authorities evacuated the Parisian prisoners to the south in early June. Grynszpan was sent to Orléans and, by bus, to the prison at Bourges. En route, the convoy was attacked by German aircraft. Some prisoners were killed, and others escaped in the confusion. One was apparently Grynszpan, since he was not among the survivors who arrived in Bourges. However, he had not escaped; he had been left behind. Instead of escaping, he walked to Bourges and surrendered to the police. Grynszpan was sent to make his own way to Toulouse, where he was incarcerated. He had no money, knew no one in the region, and spoke little French.

The Nazis were on Grynszpan's trail; Grimm, now an official in the German foreign ministry, and SS Sturmbannführer, Karl Bömelburg arrived in Paris on 15 June with orders to find him. They followed him to Orléans and Bourges, where they learned that he had been sent to Toulouse (in Vichy France's unoccupied zone). France had surrendered on 22 June, and a term of the armistice gave the Germans the right to demand the surrender of all "Germans named by the German Government" to the occupation authorities. Although Grynszpan was not a German citizen, Germany was his last place of legal residence and the Vichy authorities did not object to Grimm's demand that he be handed over. Grynszpan was illegally extradited to Germany on 18 July 1940, and was interrogated by the Gestapo. He was delivered to Bömelburg (on the border of the occupied zone), driven to Paris, flown to Berlin and imprisoned at Gestapo headquarters on Prinz-Albrecht-Strasse.

== Legal manoeuvres in Germany ==
Grynszpan spent the rest of his life in German custody, at the Moabit prison in Berlin and in concentration camps at Sachsenhausen and Flossenbürg. At Sachsenhausen he was housed in the bunker reserved for special prisoners with Kurt Schuschnigg, the last pre-Anschluss chancellor of Austria. Grynszpan received relatively mild treatment because Goebbels intended him to be the subject of a show trial proving the complicity of "international Jewry" in the Rath killing. Grimm and Wolfgang Diewerge (an official in Goebbels' ministry) were put in charge of trial preparations, using files seized from Moro-Giafferi's Paris offices; Moro-Giafferi had escaped to Switzerland.

Goebbels found bringing Grynszpan to trial in Germany as difficult as it had been in France. Although the Nazis held unchallenged political power, the state bureaucracy retained its independence in many areas (and harboured the most effective networks of the German resistance). The Justice Ministry (still staffed by lawyers intent on upholding the letter of the law) argued that since Grynszpan was not a German citizen, he could not be tried in Germany for a murder he had committed outside Germany; a minor at the time, he could not face execution. Arguments dragged on through 1940 and into 1941. The solution was to charge Grynszpan with high treason, for which he could be tried and executed. Persuading everyone concerned of its legality took some time, and he was not indicted until October 1941. The indictment stated that Grynszpan's objective in shooting Rath was to "prevent through force of threats the Führer and Reichschancellor from the conduct of their constitutional functions" at the behest of international Jewry.

In November, Goebbels saw Hitler and obtained his approval for a show trial which would put "World Jewry in the dock". The trial was set for January 1942, with former French foreign minister Georges Bonnet scheduled to testify that "World Jewry" was responsible for dragging France into a war with Germany (its supposed political objective).

The trial did not begin in January 1942. The United States had entered the war the previous month, as German armies suffered a major setback on the Eastern Front before battling the Red Army near Moscow. The Riom Trial of Léon Blum and other French politicians was due to begin in February, and Goebbels did not want two show trials at once. There were also further legal difficulties; it was feared that Grynszpan would challenge the legality of his deportation from France, which the Justice Ministry officials felt had been "irregular". Most disturbing of all was the revelation that Grynszpan would claim that he had shot Rath because of a homosexual relationship. This was communicated to Grimm, Diewerge, and other officials by Justice Ministry state secretary Roland Freisler (later the head of the People's Court) on 22 January. Grynszpan, who had rejected the idea of using this defence when Moro-Giafferi suggested it in 1938, had apparently changed his mind. He told Heinrich Jagusch (one of his Gestapo interrogators) in mid-1941 that he intended using this defence but the Justice Ministry did not inform Goebbels, who was furious. He wrote in his diary:

Grynszpan has invented the insolent argument that he had a homosexual relationship with ... Rath. That is, of course, a shameless lie; however it is thought out very cleverly and would, if brought out in the course of a public trial, certainly become the main argument of enemy propaganda.

The Justice Ministry indicted Grynszpan under Paragraph 175, and the infuriated Goebbels said that the additional indictment implied that Grynszpan and Rath had had a homosexual relationship. Goebbels again saw Hitler in March, and assured him that the trial would begin in May (without warning him about the possibility of a crime-of-passion defence). In April, he was still grappling with the problem:

I am having lots of work preparing the Grynszpan trial. The Ministry of Justice has deemed it proper to furnish the defendant, the Jew Grynszpan, the argument of Article 175 [the German law against homosexuality]. Grynszpan until now has always claimed, and rightly so, that he had not even known the Counsellor of the Legation whom he shot. Now there is in existence some sort of anonymous letter by a Jewish refugee, which leaves open the likelihood of homosexual intercourse between Grynszpan and Rath. It is an absurd, typically Jewish, claim. The Ministry of Justice, however, did not hesitate to incorporate this claim in the indictment and to send the indictment to the defendant. This shows again how foolishly our legal experts have acted in this case, and how shortsighted it is to entrust any political matter whatever to the jurists.

Acting Justice Minister Franz Schlegelberger wrote to Goebbels on 10 April demanding to know whether Hitler, when he had authorized the trial, had been aware that Grynszpan was planning to use a homosexual defence. What troubled the Justice Ministry was not the allegation that Rath had had a sexual relationship with Grynszpan; they knew it was false, and Grynszpan had said as much to some of his fellow inmates at Sachsenhausen. The problem was their belief that Rath was homosexual. Grynszpan had been given details of his personal life by Moro-Giafferi in Paris and revealed them in court. This would embarrass the Rath family and the Foreign Ministry; Rath's brother Gustav, a Wehrmacht officer, had been court-martialed for homosexuality. Gustav's homosexuality suggested, given the science and social paradigms of the time, the possibility that his brother may have been homosexual as well.

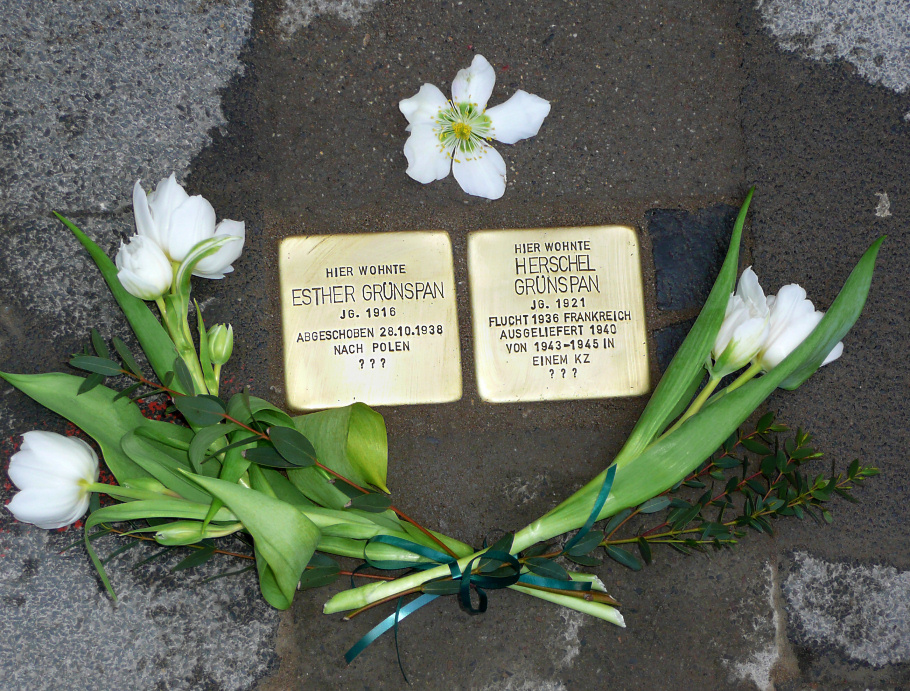
Memorial for Herschel and his sister, Esther, at their last residence in Hanover

Hitler soon learned about the problem; from whom is unclear, but it probably reached the ears of Party Chancellery head (and Hitler's private secretary) Martin Bormann. Bormann would have thought it his duty to inform Hitler that Goebbels had not told him the whole story about the Grynszpan case. The Riom Trial was called off on 4 April, after Blum and the other defendants had used it as a platform to attack the Vichy regime, which probably influenced Hitler to decide against another risky show trial. By the beginning of May 1942, it was clear that Hitler did not favour a trial. Although the matter was raised on and off for several months, without Hitler's approval there would be no progress. Grynszpan was moved in September to the prison at Magdeburg, and his fate after September 1942 is unknown. Since his trial was never called off (it was postponed indefinitely), he was probably intended to be kept alive in case circumstances changed and a trial became possible. According to Adolf Eichmann, he may still have been alive in late 1943 or early 1944 at Gestapo headquarters in Berlin. Eichmann testified at his 1961 trial that he was ordered to examine Grynszpan in 1943 or 1944, but did not know his fate.

I received an order that Grynszpan was in custody in Prinz-Albrecht-Strasse 8, and he had to be further examined concerning who was likely to have been behind the scenes. Accordingly I gave instructions to bring Grynszpan no, not this way – accordingly Krischak gave orders – Krischak was dealing with the matter – to bring Grynszpan and ... either way it would have been useless, I said to myself. I still remember exactly, for I was curious to see what Grynszpan looked like. Nothing, obviously, emerged from the whole thing and I merely said then to Krischak that if he had completed the interrogation, I wanted him to bring him to me upstairs, for I very much wanted – for once – to look at the man Grynszpan. I wanted to talk to him. And I did then, exchange a few words with Grynszpan ... I don't know what ... what happened to him. I did not hear anything more. I didn't hear anything more about it.

== Fate and rumoured survival ==
One of Grynszpan's lawyers, Serge Weill-Goudchaux, said after World War II that Grynszpan had been executed in 1940; according to Fritz Dahms of the German foreign office, he died just before the end of the war. There were reports that he was tortured to death in or about late August 1941 by Gestapo agents in retaliation for the attempted assassination of Pierre Laval. Unfounded rumours circulated after the war that he had survived and was living under another name in Paris. Several authorities believe that, according to evidence, Grynszpan died at Sachsenhausen sometime in late 1942; the historical consensus is that he did not survive the war. However, a 1946 photo emerged in 2016 of a man resembling Grynszpan in Germany.

In April 1952, German Nazi journalist Michael von Soltikow published two articles claiming that Grynszpan was living in Paris and repeated the theoretical 'gay lover' motive for Rath's murder. "Graf von Soltikow", as he liked to call himself (his real name was Walter Bennecke, and he was not an aristocrat), was a self-promoting former SS officer who had specialized in writing anti-Semitic tracts in Nazi Germany; after the war he engaged in sensationalist journalism, usually claiming that he was boldly revealing "secrets" which no one else dared to do. Soltikow wrote that he was doing a service to "World Jewry" by "proving" that Grynszpan killed Rath as the result of a homosexual relationship gone sour, rather than as the product of a world Jewish conspiracy.

The theory that Grynszpan was living in Paris and not being prosecuted for Rath's murder, despite overwhelming evidence of his guilt, would have been attractive to many Germans after the war. During the 1950s, thousands of Germans who had been involved in the Holocaust had not been prosecuted for their crimes and were allowed to live out their days in peace. German historian Wolfram Wette wrote in 2002 that in the 1950s, "the vast majority of the population retained the nationalistic attitudes that had been inculcated in them earlier. Not only did they not accept the verdict that war crimes had been committed, but they also expressed solidarity with those who had been convicted, protected them and demanded their release, preferably in the form of a general amnesty". That the Jew who had murdered a German was not prosecuted for his crime by the French, despite (supposedly) living openly in Paris, was used as an argument for not prosecuting Germans who were involved in the murder of Jews during the Shoah.

Soltikow was sued for defamation by the Rath family. In 2013, Dutch historian Sidney Smeets called Solitkow a con man whose allegations about Grynszpan and Rath were lies. During his trial in Munich, Soltikow claimed that Grynszpan was present during the previous day's court proceedings as a spectator. When the judge said that if that were true Grynszpan would have to be arrested for Rath's murder, an angry Soltikow claimed that Grynszpan would never show his face again.

In 1957, an article by German historian Helmut Heiber claimed that Grynszpan was sent to Sachsenhausen concentration camp and survived the war; another article by Egon Larsen, published two years later, said that Grynszpan had changed his name, was living in Paris and was working as a garage mechanic. Heiber's article was unmasked as based entirely on rumours that Grynszpan was alive and well in Paris. Larsen's report was based on talks with people who claimed to have met people who knew that Grynszpan was living in Paris; despite their claims about his survival, no one had ever actually seen Grynszpan. The only person who claimed to have seen Grynszpan was Soltikow; everyone else claimed to have talked with other people who supposedly met Grynszpan. Heiber retracted his 1957 article in 1981, saying that he now believed that Grynszpan died during the war.

French doctor Alain Cuenot, who made the most extensive search for Grynszpan during the late 1950s, reported that he found no evidence that Grynszpan was alive; Cuenot found no references to Grynszpan in German documents after 1942, which strongly suggested that he had died that year: "If Grynszpan had survived the years 1943, 1944 and 1945, it would seem quite unusual that documents would not have been added to those already gathered". Cuenot noted that due to poor living conditions at Sachsenhausen, epidemics regularly killed thousands of inmates; he speculated that Grynszpan may have died in an epidemic, and SS camp officers would have a vested interest in covering up his death because he was supposed to be kept alive to be tried.

According to American historian Alan E. Steinweis, Grynszpan was executed by the SS in 1942 when it became clear that he would not be tried for Rath's murder. Grynszpan was declared legally dead by the West German government in 1960 (with his date of death fixed as 8 May 1945). This declaration was at the request of his parents, who had emigrated to Israel in 1948 and said that they had heard nothing from him since the war. Since Grynszpan was extremely close to his parents and siblings (and was moved to assassinate Rath out of outrage at their treatment), it is unlikely that he would not contact his parents or his brother if he were alive after the war. During his two years in Paris (1936–1938), the lonely Grynszpan had written frequently to his family in Hanover about how much he missed them and how he wanted to see them again. The lack of communication with his family after 1945 would have been out of character. His parents, sending him to what they thought was safety in Paris while they and his siblings remained in Germany, survived the war. After their deportation to Poland they escaped in 1939 to the Soviet Union, where Grynszpan's sister Esther was murdered in 1942.

After the war the remaining family members immigrated to Mandatory Palestine, which later became the states of Israel, Jordan and Palestine. Sendel Grynszpan was present at the 1952 Israeli premiere of A Child of Our Time, Michael Tippett's oratorio inspired by Rath's murder and the ensuing pogrom.

Grynszpan was widely shunned during his lifetime by Jewish communities around the world, who saw him as an irresponsible, immature teenager who (by recklessly killing a minor official like Rath) brought down the wrath of the Nazis in Kristallnacht. Ron Roizen wrote that the frequent claims of Grynszpan's survival, despite all the evidence suggesting that he died sometime in late 1942, reflected the guilt of Jews who shunned Grynszpan during his lifetime; his "abandonment seems a little less problematic, too, once it is believed that the boy miraculously survived the war. Grynszpan alive permits us to avoid more easily the painful moral issues his case so profoundly symbolizes. Was Grynszpan's action that of a heroic martyr or a misguided pariah? Were the reactions to Grynszpan's action among those for whom it was carried out appropriate or inappropriate? Though nearly a half century has passed since Herschel Grynszpan's assassination of Ernst Rath, little or no progress has been made on these painful questions."

=== Purported 1946 photo ===
In December 2016, a photograph found among a group of uncatalogued photos in the archives of the Jewish Museum Vienna by chief archivist, Christa Prokisch led to speculation that Grynszpan could have survived the war. The photograph, taken at a displaced persons camp in Bamberg, Bavaria, on 3 July 1946, shows a man resembling Grynszpan participating in a demonstration by Holocaust survivors against British refusal to let them emigrate to the Mandate of Palestine. A facial recognition test indicated a 95% possibility, the highest possible score, that the man in the photo was Grynszpan.

== See also ==
- List of people who disappeared mysteriously: 1910–1990
- David Frankfurter, a Jew from Croatia, assassin of Wilhelm Gustloff

== Sources ==
- Ardolin, J.; Webb, C. (2008). "Herschel Grynszpan". Holocaust Education & Archive Research Team.
- Schwab, G. (1990). The Day the Holocaust Began. New York: Praeger. ISBN 9780275935764.
- Smeets, S. (2013). De Wanhoopsdaad (in Dutch). Amsterdam: Balans. ISBN 9789460037184.
