= Vincent de Moro-Giafferi =

French lawyer (1878–1956)

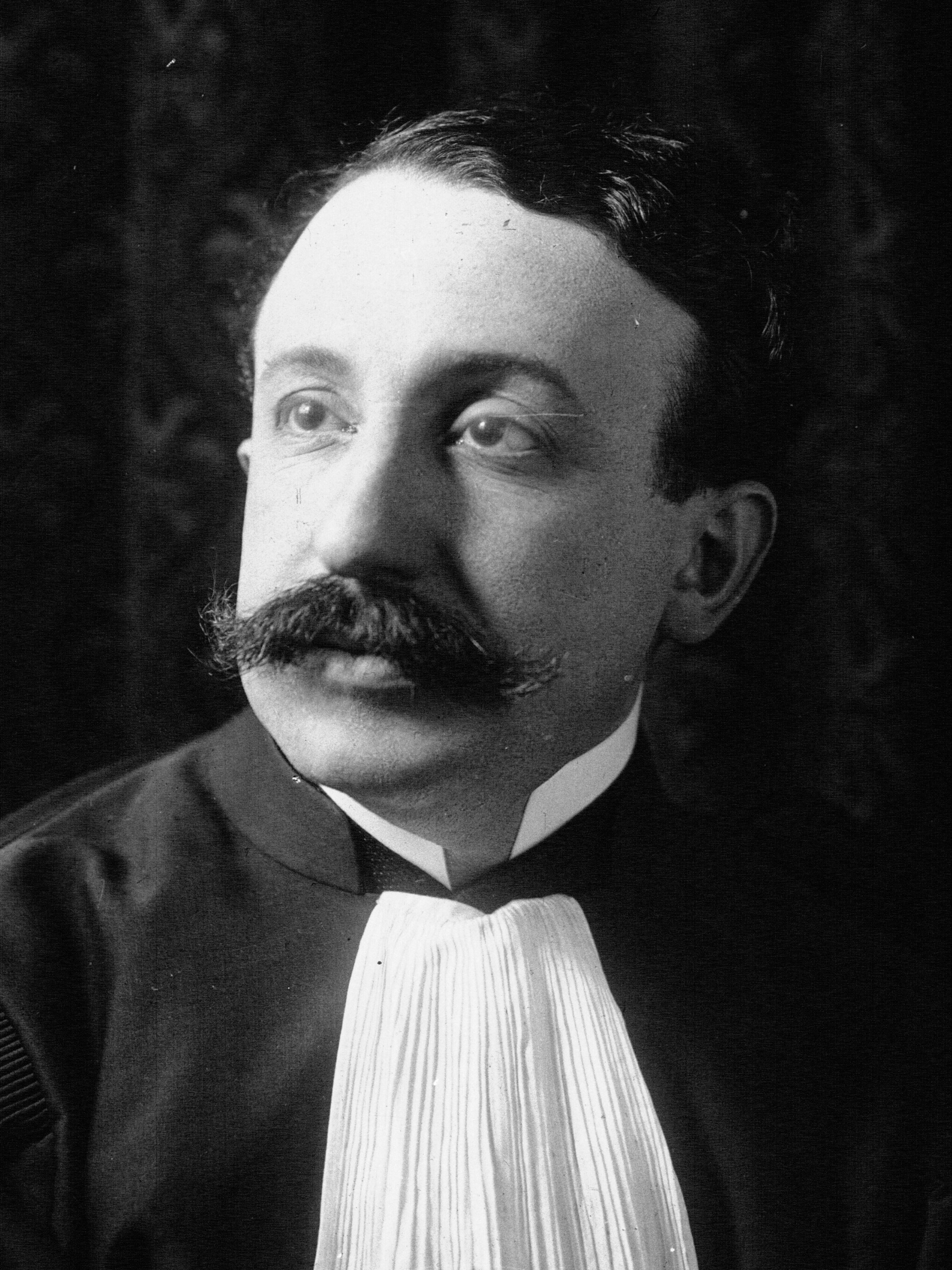
Vincent de Moro-Giafferi in 1913

Vincent de Moro-Giafferi (6 June 1878 in Paris – 22 November 1956) was a French criminal attorney.

Moro-Giafferi was the youngest person ever appointed to the Paris bar at the age of 24. Also active in politics, he was made a Deputy to the French National Assembly from Corsica at the age of 31 in 1919. As a member of the Radical Socialist Party, he was a strong supporter of French Premier Pierre Mendès France. A Radical deputy from 1919 to 1928, he then took part in the Rally of Left Republicans from 1946 to 1956.

== Life ==
His family came from Corsica. Moro-Giafferi served in the French army in World War I, and was an officer of the Legion of Honor. He held the Croix de Guerre.

One of the most famous criminal lawyers of his era, he acquired a reputation that was global in scope. He was known as a brilliant orator, and his courtrooms were packed with other lawyers, and the general public, who would come to see his skills on display. According to his obituary in the New York Times, his rhetorical skills were so prodigious that once in 1913, after he had won an acquittal for a highly questionable client, a debate arose among the members of the French bar as to the value of the jury system in general.

Nevertheless, Moro-Giafferi is best known for a case that never actually went to trial. He was asked to defend the Polish-German assassin Herschel Grynszpan, who was accused of murdering minor German diplomat Ernst vom Rath. The assassination had geo-political consequences as the Nazis used the incident to initiate an act of state terrorism against the Jews in Germany in the events of Kristallnacht. Moro-Giafferi was preparing his defense when the Germans invaded France.

He also defended several other highly controversial figures, including Henri Désiré Landru, a modern-day Bluebeard (this is the only case Moro-Giafferi ever lost), former Prime Minister Joseph Caillaux (who was accused of World War I dealings with the enemy), and Lucien Sampaix, former news editor of the Communist newspaper L'Humanité (who was charged with espionage).

During the preparation of Grynzspan's defense, Moro-Giafferi is said to have received many threats. The American journalist Dorothy Thompson helped arrange the defense fund for Grynszpan.

=== In literature ===
In his iconoclastic political/science fiction novel War with the Newts, antifascist Czech writer Karel Čapek depicts a revolt of sea newts: Initially a badly exploited Lumpenproletariat, the newts, equipped by mankind with heavy weapons and underwater dredging equipment start destroying the coasts of the continents to create more Lebensraum for their fast expanding species. In a move not unlike to the Munich Agreement the westerns powers call a peace conference in Vaduz and barter the destruction of China and Far East coasts in exchange with a status-quo on their own shores. The main negotiator on the Newts side is said to be a crack French lawyer named Julien Rosso Castelli, a transparent reference to Moro-Giafferi, who had acquired international fame when he and a group of intellectuals had staged a spoof trial of the Reichstag fire, directly accusing Hermann Göring of committing the arson. In February 1936 Giafferi hurried to Davos, Switzerland, where David Frankfurter had shot and killed Wilhelm Gustloff, the head of the Swiss branch of the German Nazi Party.
