= Gert Haucke =

German actor (1929–2008)

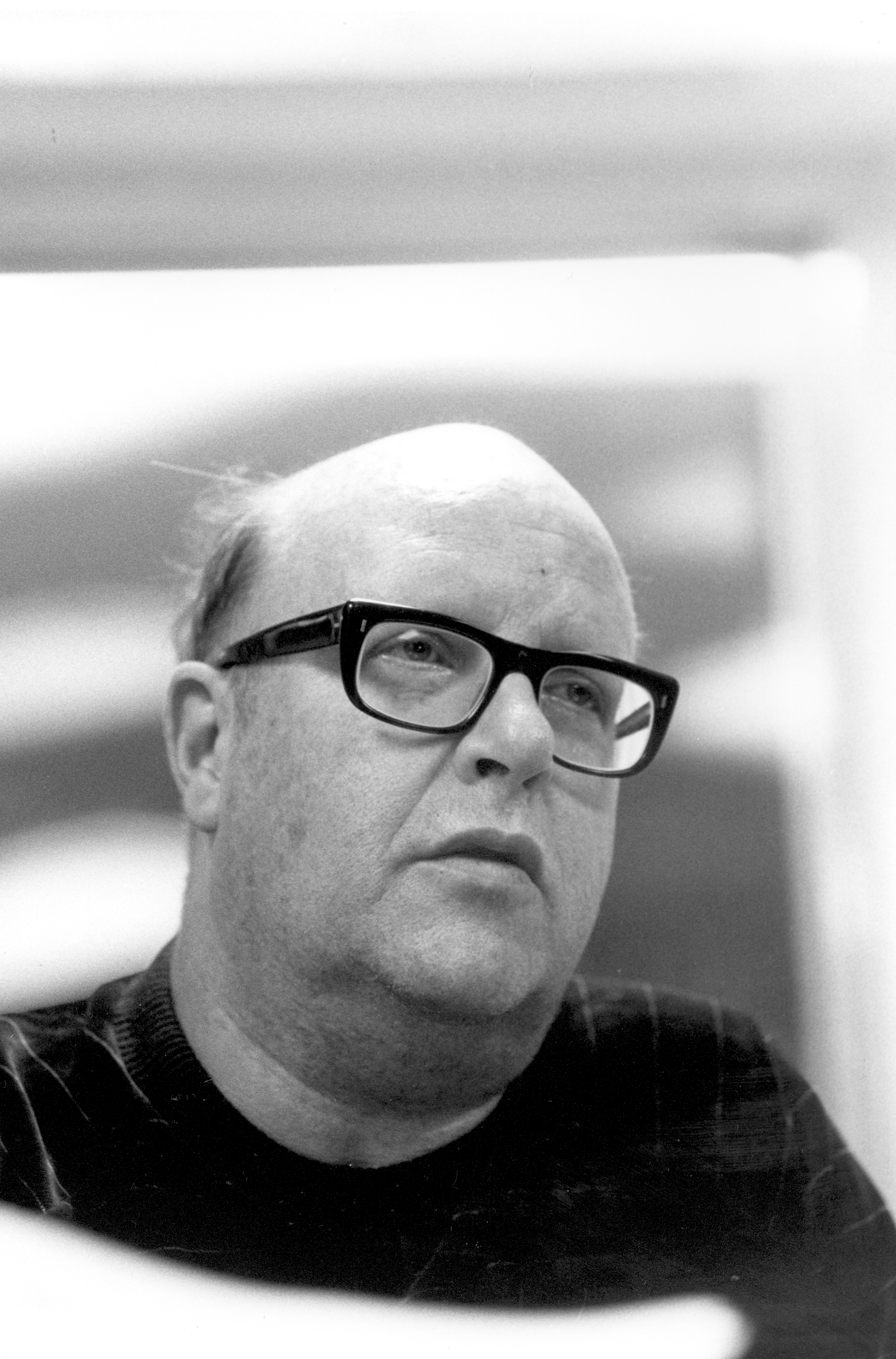
Gert Haucke in 1986

Gert Haucke (1929–2008) was a German film and television actor.

== Partial filmography ==
- Rumpelstilzchen (1960) as Haushofmeister
- Das Glück läuft hinterher (1963) as Bedeutender Mann
- Honour Among Thieves (1966), as Arthur
- Ein Mann namens Harry Brent (1968, TV miniseries), as William Brother
- Death in the Red Jaguar (1968), as Kit Davis
- Eine große Familie (1970, TV film), as Weinmüller
- Der Kommissar: Lisa Bassenges Mörder (1971, TV series episode), as Herr Fechtner
- Ludwig: Requiem for a Virgin King (1972), as Baron Freyschlag
- The Stuff That Dreams Are Made Of (1972), as Zuhälter Karl Concon
- Bauern, Bonzen und Bomben (1973, TV miniseries), as Emil Manzow
- Tatort: Kressin und die zwei Damen aus Jade (1973, TV series episode), as Göbel
- Die Verrohung des Franz Blum (1974), as Oberverwalter Engelweich
- Der Lord von Barmbeck (1974), as Schlachter-Karl
- Der kleine Doktor: Ein Holländer in Paris (1974, TV series episode), as Kees van der Donck
- Krankensaal 6 (1974), as Sergejytsch
- Assassination in Davos (1974), as Wilhelm Gustloff
- Tadellöser & Wolff (1975, TV miniseries), as Dr. Fink
- Knife in the Back (1975), as Schöffe Vater
- Derrick: Alarm auf Revier 12 (1975, TV series episode), as Ross
- By Hook or by Crook (1975)
- A Lost Life (1976), as Kommissar Weber
- The Old Fox: Die Dienstreise (1977, TV series episode), as Rudi Stallmann
- Ein Mann will nach oben (1978, TV series), as Dienstmann Kiesow
- Der Geist der Mirabelle (1978, TV film), as Kallesen
- Land, das meine Sprache spricht (1980, TV film), as Standartenführer
- Der König und sein Narr (1981, TV film), as Jean Quirin de Forcade
- Wir (1982, TV film) (based on We, the 1921 Russian novel by Yevgeny Zamyatin), as S-4710
- Bananen-Paul (1982), as Oppositionsführer
- The Old Fox: Teufelsküche (1982, TV series episode), as Werner Prott
- The Oppermanns (1983, TV film), as Prof. Mühlheim
- Die Supernasen (1983), as Direktor Heinrich Sasse
- What's Up, Chancellor? (1984), as Herr Hillermann
- Non-Stop Trouble with the Family (1985), as Hauswirt
- Seitenstechen (1985), as Mr. Böhm
- Didi Drives Me Crazy (1986), as Grueter
- Der Landarzt (1987–2004, TV series, 110 episodes), as Bruno Hanusch (final appearance)
- Non-Stop Trouble with the Experts (1988), as Professor Alois Schönberg
- Fifty-Fifty (1988), as Vater Kranich
- Adrian und die Römer (1989), as Heinz Schikaneder
- Derrick: Wie kriegen wir Bodetzki? (1989, TV series episode), as Bodetzki
- Ein Fall für zwei: Zyankali (1989, TV series episode), as Fackelmann
- The Man Inside (1990), as Heinz Herbert Schultz
- Kollege Otto – Die Coop-Affäre (1991, TV film), as Alfons Lappas
- Ein Fall für zwei: Tod frei Haus (1991, TV series episode), as Dr. Hanstädter
- Der König von Dulsberg (1994, TV film), as Berger
- Faust: Inkasso (1994, TV series episode), as Gustav Schweiger
- Tatort: : Tödliche Freundschaft (1995, TV series episode), as Nowak
- Blutige Spur (1995, TV film), as Kommissar Watzke
- Ein Fall für zwei: Miese Tricks (1996, TV series episode), as Wolfgang Preute
- Halali (1995), as Brüderle
- Diebinnen (1996)
- Rosa Roth: Nirgendwohin (1996, TV series episode), as Kasunke
- Großstadtrevier: Brennende Probleme (1997, TV series episode), as Jakob Meier
- Der Ermittler (2001–2002, TV series, 2 episodes), as Dr. Tschupka
