= Johannes von Welczeck =

German diplomat (1878–1972)

Graf Johannes Bernhard von Welczeck
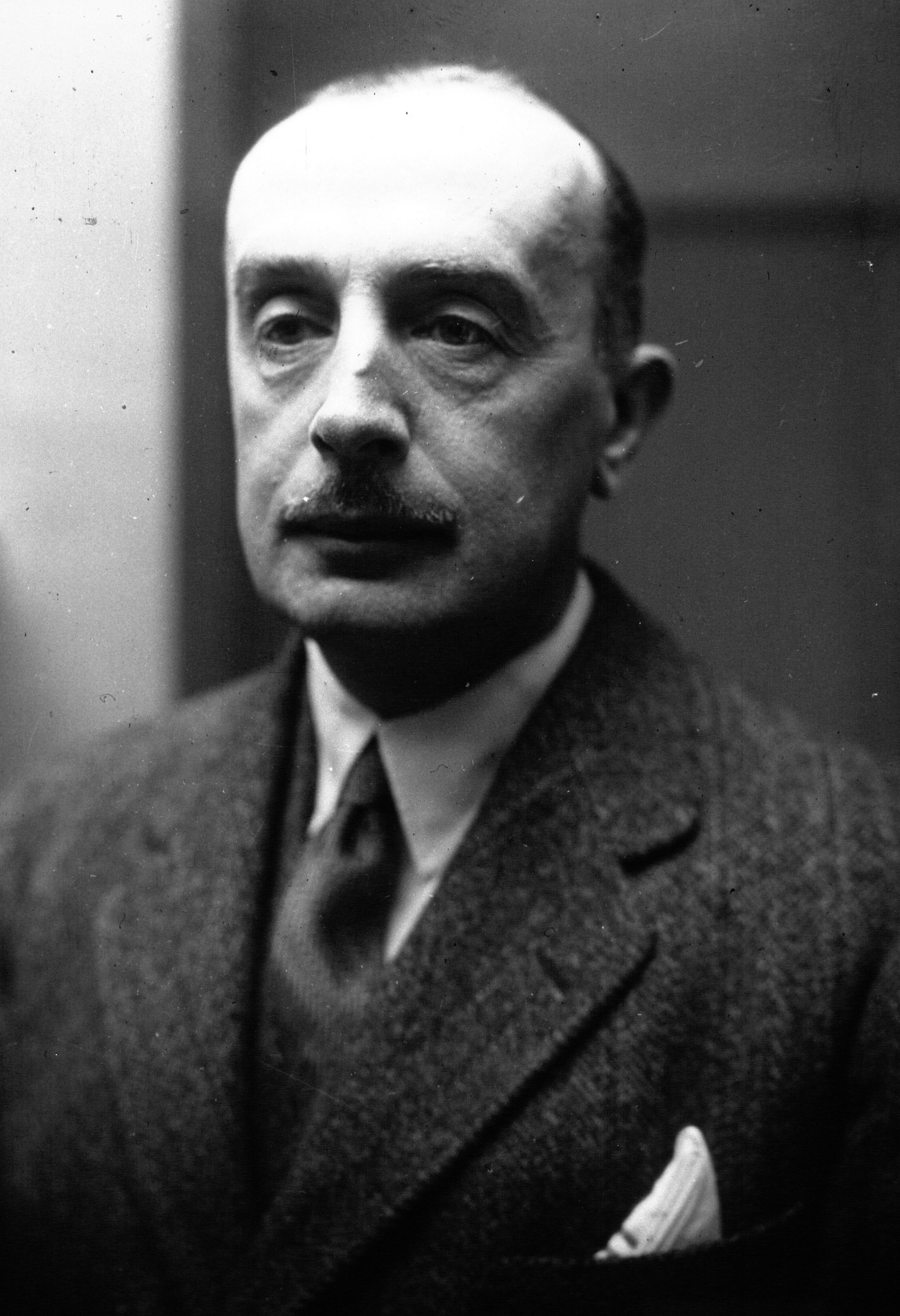
- Johannes von Welczeck in 1932

German Ambassador to France
- In office 22 April 1936 – 23 August 1939
- Preceded by: Roland Köster
- Succeeded by: Otto Abetz (1940)

German Ambassador to Spain
- In office 15 March 1926 – 20 April 1936
- Preceded by: Ernst Langwerth von Simmern
- Succeeded by: Hans Hermann Völckers (Chargé d'affaires)

Personal details
- Born: 2 September 1878 Laband, Silesia, Prussia, German Empire (now Łabędy, Poland)
- Died: 11 October 1972 (aged 94) Marbella, Spain
- Party: Nazi Party
- Education: University of Bonn

Johannes Bernhard Graf von Welczeck (2 September 1878 – 11 October 1972) was a German diplomat who served as the last German ambassador to France before World War II.

== Aristocrat ==
Welczeck was born into an aristocratic family in Laband (modern Łabędy, Poland) in the Upper Silesia province of the Kingdom of Prussia, his parents being Count Bernhard von Welczeck (1844–1917) and Countess Louise von Hatzfeldt zu Trachenberg (1852–1909). Welczeck studied at the University of Bonn in Bonn and in 1897 joined the exclusive Corps Borussia Bonn student club, which was reserved for royalty and nobility at the time.

== Diplomat ==
In 1904, he joined the highly elitist Auswärtiges Amt (Foreign Office), one of the most prestigious branches of the state under the German Empire. Welczeck began his career as the German consul-general in New Delhi. In 1908, he became the first secretary to Hans von und zu Bodman, the German ambassador to Chile. On 20 November 1910, he married Luisa Balmaceda y Fontecilla (1886–1973) in Santiago, by whom he had four children. Welczeck's wife was a member of the powerful Balmaceda family, one of the richest and most influential families in Chile. Most of his duties in Chile concerned lobbying for arms contracts for German firms, most notably the firm of Krupp AG, the largest corporation in Europe and one of the world's biggest manufacturers of weapons. The Chilean Army had been trained by a German military mission, and German influence was strong in Chile. In 1915, he became the Prussian chargé d'affairs in Dresden, Saxony. In January 1917, upon the death of his father, he inherited the title of count, and was henceforward known as Count von Welczeck.

From 1923 to 1925, he was the German minister in Budapest. From 1925 to 1936, he was the German ambassador in Madrid. In January 1926 he was involved in efforts to circumvent the disarmament clauses of the Treaty of Versailles by having the Deutsche Bank make a five million reichsmark loan via the Banco Alemán Transatlantico (which it owned) to the Spanish industrialist Horacio Echevarrieta, in exchange for which Echevarrieta opened up a torpedo factory for the Reichsmarine in Bilbao.

From 9 May 1932 to 15 July 1932, he headed the German delegation at the World Disarmament Conference in Geneva. As someone from Upper Silesia, which had been violently partitioned between Germany and Poland in 1921, Welczeck was well known for his ferocious hatred of Poles, and spent much of his time in Geneva clashing with the Polish foreign minister, August Zaleski, who headed the Polish delegation. The American historian Carole Fink described Welczeck as a "notorious Polonophobe" whose constant Polish-bashing did much to annoy the other delegates at the League of Nations. When the Sanation regime introduced a land reform law in the Polish Corridor to seize the land holdings of the Junker estates, Welczeck represented Germany at the League of Nations Human Rights Committee, where he argued that the land reform in the Polish Corridor was targeting farms owned by Germans to "Polonise" the Corridor, thereby violating the Minorities Treaty, leading to a notable clash with Zaleski. Fink noted that through Welczeck had a strong case in that the land reform had largely exempted the estates owned by the szlachta, he weakened it by his strident and shill manner while Zaleski made a better impression by being calm and conciliatory.

In August 1933, Welczeck returned to Germany for his first meeting with Adolf Hitler, where he spoke at much length about the "Bolshevik danger" in Spain. Welczeck portrayed Spain on the brink of a Communist revolution, describing Spain as a nation hard hit by the Great Depression where many of the unemployed were joining the Spanish Communist Party. Welczeck wanted German intelligence to play a greater role in Spain. Welczeck stated that Hitler met his plan "only half-way", agreeing to send Abwehr agents disguised as businessmen to Spain to monitor Spanish Communists and anarchists, but vetoed his plans for intelligence-sharing with the Spanish police. On 1 October 1934, Welczeck joined the Nazi Party. In 1934–35, Welczeck was highly alarmed by social unrest in Spain and favored having General Francisco Franco appointed minister of war. Welczeck was obsessive in his fears of Communism in Spain, constantly warning Berlin that a revolution could take place at any moment and that all of the property and assets owned by German businesses in Spain would be lost.

== Ambassador in Paris ==
=== The Front populaire era and the Spanish Civil War ===
In April 1936, Welczeck arrived in Paris as the new German ambassador. The French historian Lucas Delattre described Welczeck as a "diplomat of the old school", being well known in Paris for his courtly, suave manners (albeit with an irascible streak); elegant clothing; and his fluent French, which he spoke with a strong upper-class accent. Welczeck had familial connections with the French aristocracy via his step-aunt, the Comtesse Jean de Castelane. Welczeck was the only German ambassador in Paris during the interwar era to be admitted to the Union, one of the most exclusive social clubs in Paris that only accepted the creme-de-creme of the French elite. However, Welczeck was not favored with close friendships with the French cabinet ministers in the same way that his Anglo-American counterparts, namely Sir Eric Phipps and William Christian Bullitt Jr. were. Both Bullitt and Phipps were more popular socially with the French elite than Welczeck, who was somewhat disliked on the account of the regime he loyally served. Hitler's tendency to recall Welczeck back to Germany during moments of crisis as he did in September 1938, March–April 1939 and August 1939 limited his effectiveness as an ambassador with Baron Ernst von Weizsäcker, the State Secretary of the Auswärtiges Amt, complaining that when Germany needed Welczeck the most in Paris he was absent.

Shortly after he arrived in Paris, the Front populaire won the French National Assembly election of 3 May 1936, leading to a coalition government headed by the Socialist leader Leon Blum coming to power. Through Blum was a Socialist and a Jew, Welczeck's relations with him were cordial enough. Blum found Welczeck together with the Reichsbank president Hjalmar Schacht to be the more reasonable sort of Nazis, stating he considered both Welczeck and Schacht to be "rational, civilized Europeans" whom it was possible for him to negotiate with. Notably, Hitler refused to meet Blum under any conditions, and as such Welczeck became Blum's main conduit with the German government. Blum and his cabinet made a point of visiting Welczeck at the German embassy to tell him that France wanted good relations with Germany and hoped for a return to the Locarno era.

As the former ambassador to Spain, Welczeck played a major role as an adviser on Spanish affairs following the appeal for aid from the Spanish Nationalists in July 1936. Right from the start, Welczeck favored aid to Franco over General Emilio Mola, the other leader of the junta that had launched the botched coup d'état of 17 July 1936 that caused the civil war. He was opposed to two messengers from Mola in Paris going on to Berlin in order to favor Franco, successfully arguing for the Reich to deny permission for Mola's representatives to enter Berlin. Welczeck initially advocated caution in Spain, believing that the junta of rebellious generals who just failed to overthrow the Second Spanish Republic would lose the civil war. More importantly, the new Popular Front government in Paris led by Premier Leon Blum had decided to aid the Spanish Republicans with military aid, which led him to fear that the civil war in Spain could cause a Franco-German war "prematurely" before German rearmament was completed. The news that Hitler had decided on 24 July 1936 to intervene in Spain caused him much worry. The fact that the Blum government under strong pressure from Britain agreed to a policy of non-intervention in Spain was a source of much relief for Welczeck, who became more supportive of German intervention in Spain once it was clear that there was no danger of French intervention. However, even after the intervention occurred he cabled Berlin urging the government to limit the scale of the intervention and warning that the German Condor Legion air raids on Spain were causing the French Left to become more supportive of further intervention on behalf of the Republicans.

In October 1936 in a meeting at the Reich Chancellery, Hitler told the French ambassador in Berlin, André François-Poncet, that France was on the brink of civil war and that : "If Communism triumphed in France, it would be impossible for him, Hitler, to consider this event an internal French affair". The next day, the French Foreign Minister Yvon Delbos handed Welczeck a note formally protesting against Hitler's statement, stating it was unacceptable for Hitler to make statements implying a right to intervene in French domestic affairs. Welczeck defended Hitler, claiming despite what he had said to François-Poncet that Hitler was only engaging in "defensive measures" such as building the Siegfried Line in the newly remilitized Rhineland as he blamed the problems in Franco-German relations entirely on the French. The meeting ended on an extremely unfriendly tone with Welczeck and Delbos arguing about what Hitler had said and meant. In November 1936, Welczeck reported to Berlin that the Spanish Civil War had led to: "the downright hysterical nervousness that has been evident among the public here for several days and has started crack-brained rumours circulating regarding the inevitability of war, simultaneous military attacks on France from the east and south planned by Germany".

In December 1936, Delbos contracted Welczeck with an offer to mediate an end to the Spanish Civil War. Provided that the civil war in Spain could be ended via Franco-German mediation, Delbos was willing to discuss the return of the former German colonies in Africa held by France as League of Nations mandates, an end to the arms race, and an economic agreement to lower tariffs in order to end the trade wars in Europe. The introduction of the Four Year Plan in Germany in September 1936 had caused much alarm in France. This was especially the case as the Four Year Plan envisioned Germany becoming self-sufficient by developing substitutes for commonalties such as oil, even through it was likely to cost hundreds of millions of Reichsmarks. In the 1930s, 80% of the oil Germany used was imported from the United States, Venezuela, and Mexico and Hitler's claim that Germany needed to be self-sufficient in artificial oil because of the alleged danger of the Soviet Navy seizing control of the North Atlantic was not widely believed in Paris. Within the French government, the implications of the Four Year Plan with its call for Germany to have a wartime economy by 1940 were well understood.

To underscore the importance of the offer, on 18 December 1936, Blum met with Welczeck to tell him that the entire French cabinet had approved of this offer, saying that provided that the Spanish civil war was ended, Germany would certainly have its former colonies in Africa returned. Blum further pointed out that because the German economy was three times larger than the French economy (which would ensure that in an economic union that the Reich would be the senior partner), that this was a major French concession and he expected Germany to do likewise by ending the Four Year Plan. Welczeck was in favor of taking up the French offer, but the Foreign Minister, Baron Konstantin von Neurath was opposed, advising Adolf Hitler to reject it. In March 1937, Welczeck wrote bitterly that Germany had "missed the boat" by refusing to respond to Delbos' offer, just like it had in March 1918 when it launched Operation Michael, the offensive intended to win the First World War instead of negotiating peace.

As the former ambassador to Spain, Welczeck was regarded as the Spanish expert within the Auswärtiges Amt and he warned Neurath against efforts to "reform" the Spanish Nationalists whom the Reich was backing in the civil war, stating that the Spanish generally disliked foreigners and would not accept the German advice to "reform". The Germans were frustrated by the slow path of the Spanish Nationalist Army; their inability to mobilise the economy of the areas of Spain and Spanish Morocco that they controlled and feuding within the Frente Nacional, but Welczeck advised accepting the Frente Nacional as it was. Welczeck also warned against the efforts to back the Falange, the Spanish fascist party within the Frente Nacional, warning that though the Falange was the Spanish party most closest ideologically to the NSDAP, it was also the weakest comportment of the Frente Nacional. Welczeck's relations with Joachim von Ribbentrop, who became the German Foreign Minister on 4 February 1938 were not close.

=== The Sudetenland crisis ===
During the Sudetenland crisis of 1938, Welczeck did not see the French Foreign Minister, Georges Bonnet, between 30 April-25 May 1938, but met the Premier Édouard Daladier several times. Welczeck reported to Berlin statements from Daladier and especially Bonnet that seemed to suggest that France would not to go to war if Germany invaded Czechoslovakia. Welczeck reported to Berlin on 25 May 1938 that Bonnet had told him that France "recognised the effort" made by German to prevent the May crisis from turning into a war. Bonnet's account of the meeting recorded him as saying: "I pointed out to Count Welczeck that if I had not asked him officially to come earlier it was because I feared that in this period of tension it might have been considered that I was making a comminatory démarche".

On 9 August 1938, Welczeck reported that Bonnet had told him: "we [the French] would have to go to the extreme limits of compromise in the Sudeten German question, even though this did not suit the Czechs". On 2 September 1938, Bonnet told Welczeck that "France was definitely going to stand by its commitments". However, Welczeck also reported that Bonnet had told him: "after a repetition of the general peace talk, which I have often heard from him, he added that...he himself, Daladier and other members of the cabinet were sincere admirers of the Führer...he, Bonnet, wished for nothing more ardently than to see the Führer in Paris as the guest of the French government...In the present situation, he wanted to leave no room for doubt that France and Britain at her side, were firmly resolved to hasten to the assistance of the Czechs if they were attacked by German troops...In France and Britain, however, nothing was so ardently desired as peace...we could depend upon it, that the Czechoslovak government would be forced to accept Runciman's verdict, which in all probability would mean the fulfilment of 70, 80 or 90 percent of the Sudeten German demands". Welczeck consistently portrayed Bonnet in his reports as a man who did not want to honor France's alliances with Czechoslovakia in 1938 and Poland in 1939. In September 1938, Welczeck reported that if Germany invaded Czechoslovakia, then France would almost certainly declare war on the Reich. Hitler dismissed out of hand Welczeck's warning that France would go to war for Czechoslovakia.

On 31 October 1938, Bonnet told Welczeck that he wanted a German draft of the Declaration of Franco-German Friendship finished as he wanted to sign the declaration the end of the year. Bonnet warned Welczeck that French people had welcomed the Munich Agreement, which prevented a world war in 1938-but that public opinion was now turning against the Munich Agreement with the feeling being that France had sacrificed too much for nothing in return. Bonnet also expressed concern about an upcoming visit by Neville Chamberlain to Paris on 24 November 1938 as he stated he wanted to avoid the impression that "the agreement had been made under British tutelage". On 8 November 1938, Welczeck told Bonnet that Ribbentrop did not share his concerns about Chamberlain's visit and that signing the declaration was not considered an urgent matter in Berlin.

=== Assassination of Ernst vom Rath ===
On 7 November 1938, when going out for his morning walk on the streets of Paris, Welczeck by-passed Herschel Grynszpan on his way into the German embassy at 78 rue de Lille. Grynszpan, speaking to Welczeck in German said he needed to talk to "his excellency, the ambassador" about an urgent matter. Grynszpan had decided to assassinate the German ambassador to France, a task somewhat complicated by the fact that he did not know his name or what he looked like. Welczeck wore a swastika label pin on his coat, showing that he was a NSDAP party member and Grynszpan, who had grown up Jewish in the Third Reich, recognized that he must be someone connected with the embassy. The distance between the worlds of Welczeck, an aristocrat dressed in an expensive suit with a silver handle walking cane who spoke his German with an upper-class accent vs. Grynszpan, a stateless illegal immigrant living on the margins of French society dressed in cheap second-hand clothes who spoke his German with a working class accent could not have been greater. The fact that Grynszpan did not know the name of the ambassador or recognize that he was speaking to the ambassador, instead speaking only of "his excellency, the ambassador" led Welczeck to conclude that he was someone unimportant. Furthermore, spies do not normally tell strangers on the street that they are spies, which led Welczeck to doubt Grynszpan's claims to be a spy with a "most important document" he could only show to the ambassador.

Unwilling to end his walk to talk to a teenager dressed in shabby clothes with an unlikely story about being a spy, Welczeck pointed to the embassy and said the ambassador was there; unknown to him, Grynszpan had a gun and was planning to assassinate him to protest Nazi Germany's antisemitic policies. Welczeck later snobbishly told the French police that he felt that Grynszpan was someone who was beneath him to speak to and he lied about not being the ambassador just to end the conversation. Grynszpan went into the embassy to ask to see the ambassador (whom he was unaware that he had just spoken to), claiming to be some sort of spy who had a secret document he could only show to the ambassador. Growing increasingly agitated when he learned that Welczeck was out for a walk, Grynszpan was ushered into the office of the third secretary Ernst vom Rath to show him his "most important document"; Rath would then decide whether the document was important for him to show to Welczeck when he returned. Grynszpan, who had no documents instead pulled out his handgun and assassinated Rath, shooting him in his office. Grynszpan later told the French police that had he known that the man with the swastika label pin whom he spoke with in front of the embassy was the ambassador, he would have killed him instead of Rath. The assassination was used by the Nazis as a pretext for the Kristallnacht pogrom.

=== The Danzig crisis ===
The Kristallnacht pogrom damaged the image of Germany and afterwards, Ribbentrop became keen to visit Paris to sign the Declaration of Franco-German Friendship to show that the Reich was not isolated. On 23 November 1938, Bonnet told Welczeck that he wanted Ribbentrop to come to Paris on 29 November to sign the declaration. Ribbentrop told Welczeck to say that he could not visit Paris as long as there was a wave of general strikes organised by the French Communist Party against the deflationary degrees passed by the Finance Minister Paul Reynaud on 14 November 1938. On 29 November 1938, Bonnet met with Welczeck to tell Ribbentrop to come to Paris as soon as possible, saying "the longer it [Ribbentrop's visit] was postponed the more ominous might be the effect of the intrigues of all the opponents of a Franco-German rapprochement". Welczeck himself urged Ribbentrop to visit Paris in December to sign the declaration as he maintained postponement "would be a more difficult test case for the cabinet and might lead to its fall". On 6 December 1938, Ribbentrop visited Paris to make the first official visit by a German Foreign Minister since 1933. Welczeck was present at a meeting at the Quai d'Orsay attended by Ribbentrop, Bonnet and Alexis St.Léger, the secretary-general of the Quai d'Orsay where the declaration was signed. At a reception attended by the elite of French society to celebrate the signing of the declaration, Welczeck asked Bonnet that "non-Aryan" cabinet ministers be excluded, by which he meant Jean Zay and Georges Mandel, both of whom were Jewish. Bonnet obligated Welczeck, though neither Mandel and Zay had actually wanted to attend the reception as both maintained Ribbentrop was an appalling man whose company they did not wish to share. The only French politicians who attended the reception were Daladier, Bonnet, Camille Chautemps, Jean Mistler and Henri Bérenger.

On 24 January 1939, Bonnet told Welczeck that a statement that he was going to make before the Assemblée nationale affirming France's willingness to stand by its alliances in Eastern Europe "had been framed for domestic consumption". Bonnet read to Welczeck several excerpts from the speech he was going to give and then asked to tell Ribbentrop not to take his speech seriously. Despite Bonnet's efforts, Ribbentrop was furious when he read the excerpts and ordered Welczeck to express Germany's "astonishment" that Bonnet had spoken of "fostering and extending French friendships in eastern and central Europe". On 11 February 1939, Welczeck met with Bonnet. The French and German records of the meeting gave contradict each other. In the French version of the meeting, Bonnet defended the speech he gave before the Chamber of Deputies on 26 January 1939 while the German version of the meeting Bonnet apologized for the speech, saying that it did not reflect his foreign policy. Welczeck had Bonnet saying: "Things were often said during a foreign affairs debate, which were obviously designed for domestic consumption...If a French foreign minister, against the storm and wave of opposition, substantiated our claims to the Sudeten German territory...and then drew his own conclusions privately from the changed situation in Central Europe, he could not be expected to withdraw all along the line when facing the Chamber.".

After Germany violated the Munich Agreement on 15 March 1939 by occupying the Czech half of Czecho-Slovakia, the French Premier Édouard Daladier refused to see Welczeck until July in protest. Welczeck reported that Bonnet had told him that he had no official opinion about the occupation and that his "personal view" was that "the peace and appeasement policy of the 'men of Munich' had suffered a lamentable disaster...in every country warmongers who would lead Europe catastrophe were bound to gain the upper hand". On 6 May 1939, Welczeck was ordered by Ribbentrop not to meet with Daladier to discuss a peaceful solution to the Danzig crisis. On 19 May 1939, Welczeck met with Bonnet to tell him that Germany did not want a war with France and attacked Britain for an alleged "encirclement" policy against the Reich. Welczeck went on to say that France would have to bear "the main burden of the struggle conjured up by Britain and make enormous sacrifice of life" as he claimed that France was being used by Britain. It was after these statements that the French and German versions of the meeting diverged. The French version had Bonnet saying that France could not afford the use of force by Germany to resolve the Danzig crisis. The German version had Bonnet saying to Welczeck: "he [Bonnet] would never deviate from the main lines of his policy and would fight for peace to the very last. In spite of everything he held fast to the idea of bringing back co-operation with Germany...If I met unfriendliness in the French press where he had some influence, he would remedy matters, as far as lay his power".

On 21 May 1939, Welczeck told Sir Charles Mendl, the press attaché at the British embassy, that: "Bonnet was a man who would go to the utmost limits to avoid an [sic] European war up to the last moment. He regretted therefore that foreign affairs were so much more in the hands of M. Daladier than M. Bonnet". Welczeck concluded that "the trouble with Daladier is that he is more like a Prussian than a Frenchman". On 21 June 1939 Ribbentrop ordered Welczeck to "avoid important political conversations" with the French ministers, saying this was a direct order from Hitler himself. On 24 June 1939, Robert Coulondre, the French ambassador in Berlin, visited Paris to meet Bonnet. Coulondre advised Bonnet to tell Welczeck in no uncertain terms that France would honor its alliance with Poland if Germany should use force to resolve the Danzig crisis. Most notably, Bonnet ignored Coulondre's advice and refused to make the warning to Welczeck that Coulondre had advised would be an ideal way of saving the peace.

In June 1939, the French expelled Otto Abetz for bribing two French newspaper editors into printing pro-Nazi stories. Both Aubin of Le Temps and Moirer of Le Figaro were arrested for taking bribes from Abetz. Abetz left France on 2 July 1939. The Foreign Minister, Joachim von Ribbentrop, was furious with Welczeck when he was unable to persuade the French to take Abetz back. Welczeck's sudden visit to Berlin just after Abetz was expelled and his equally abrupt return to Paris caused alarm in the French press, which saw his trip to Berlin and back as a sign of Ribbentrop's anger at France. Allegations were made in the French press that Bonnet and his haughty wife were friends with some of the journalists Abetz had bribed and that Welczeck had documents showing that Madame Bonnet had accepted bribes from Abetz.

In response to complaints from Coulondre who in his telephone calls to Daladier noted that Bonnet had not issued the warning he wanted him to issue to Welczeck, the premier gave firm orders to the foreign minister that he must warn Welczeck that France would stand by Poland. On 1 July 1939, Bonnet met with Welczeck to tell him that any attempt to change the status of the Free City of Danzig unilaterally would cause a German-Polish war and that France would honor its alliance with Poland. Welczeck reported to Berlin that it was his understanding that Bonnet did not want France to go to war for Poland, but Daladier would stand by the alliance France had signed with Poland in 1921 if Germany invaded Poland. On 11 July 1939, Daladier met with Welczeck to tell him that he had helped the three and a half million Sudeten Germans "go home to the Reich" by the Munich Agreement, only to be rewarded by Germany placing twice that number of Czechs under German rule via the Protectorate of Bohemia-Moravia. Daladier ended the meeting by saying he tried appeasement, and that because of the bad faith of Hitler who had repudiated the Munich Agreement that he was against French pressure on Poland to make concessions in the Danzig crisis. Welczeck's anti-Polish arguments where he sought to blame Poland for the Danzig crisis and argued that it would be wrong for France to go to war for Poland failed to impress Daladier who firmly told Welczeck that it was Germany that caused the Danzig crisis.

During the Danzig crisis of 1939, an Anglo-French effort was launched to construct a "peace front" intended to deter the Reich from war. On 28 July 1939, Welczeck in a dispatch to Berlin stated he had learned from "an unusually well-informed source" that the French together with the British were sending military missions to Moscow to discuss having the Soviet Union join the "peace front". Welczeck stated that the French military mission was to be headed by General Joseph Doumenc, whom he described as "a particularly capable officer" and a former deputy chief of staff under the illustrious Marshal Maxime Weygand. The British military mission to Moscow was headed by Admiral Sir Reginald Plunket-Ernle-Erle-Drax, whom Welczeck reported that the French did not hold in high regard, not the least because of his convoluted surname. On 30 July 1939, Welczeck reported that the current talks in Moscow were stalled owing to Anglo-Soviet differences of opinion, and the decision to send the military missions was a French initiative intended to break the impasse. Welczeck added that he had the impression that the French were far more keen on having the Soviet Union join the "peace front" than the British.

In the summer of 1939, Welczeck told Bonnet that Germany was quite willing to use force to resolve the Danzig crisis and if Britain intervened, it would be the end of the British empire. On 9 August 1939, Ribbentrop forbade Welczeck together with Hans-Adolf von Moltke and Herbert von Dirksen from returning to their embassies after arriving to take their summer vacations in Germany. Ribbentrop wanted to block any peaceful effort to resolve the Danzig crisis, and believed that keeping the ambassadors out of Paris, Warsaw and London would hinder efforts at a peaceful resolution. Forbidden from returning to France, Welczeck played no more role in the Danzig crisis.

== Later life ==
In August 1940, Welczeck returned to France to handle relations with the new Vichy regime established after the fall of the Third Republic, but was overshadowed by Abetz who replaced him as ambassador in November 1940. At the show trial planned for Grynszpan in 1942, Welczeck was to serve as one of the star witnesses for the prosecution. Welczeck was to testify that Grynszpan was the "Jewish Gavrilo Princip" and that the assassination of Rath was to the origins of World War II the same as the popular image of the impact of the assassination of Archduke Franz Ferdinand was on the origins of World War I. The purpose of the Grynszpan trial was to place the blame for the outbreak of war as a result of a Jewish conspiracy against Germany, and Welczeck was to testify that Rath's assassination had set off a chain of events that led inevitably to war in 1939. The implication of the trial, though not stated explicitly, was that the "Final Solution to the Jewish Question" was only a defensive reaction to the war that the Jews were alleged to have started in 1939. Grynszpan sabotaged the trial by claiming he had been engaged in a homosexual relationship with Rath and murdered him as a result of a lovers' quarrel, a defense that was considered so humiliating that the trial never took place. In 1943, Welczeck retired from the Auswärtiges Amt. He died in his retirement in Marbella.

== Ancestry ==
Ancestors of Johannes von Welczeck

16. Baron Johann Nepomuk von Welczeck
8. Baron Bernhard Valerius von Welczeck
17. Countess Sophie Strachwitz von Gross-Zauche und Camminetz
4. Baron Johannes Bernhard von Welczeck
18. Count Ernst Joachim Strachwitz von Gross Zauche und Camminetz
9. Countess Antonia Sophie Strachwitz von Gross-Zauche und Camminetz
19. Countess Maria von Nayhauss-Cormons
2. Count Bernhard von Welczeck
20. Baron Johann George von Saurma und zu der Jeltsch
10. Baron Johann Joseph von Saurma und zu der Jeltsch
21. Baroness Marie Agnes von Saurma und zu der Jeltsch
5. Baroness Maria von Saurma von und zu der Jeltsch
22. Count Ernst Joachim Strachwitz von Gross Zauche und Camminetz (= 18)
11. Countess Maria Strachwitz von Gross-Zauche und Camminetz
23. Countess Maria von Nayhauss-Cormons (= 19)
1. Count Johannes von Welczeck
24. Count Karl Ferdinand von Hatzfeldt-Wildenburg
12. Prince Franz Ludwig von Hatzfeldt-Trachenberg
25. Baroness Maria Anna Elisabeth von Venningen
6. Count Maximilian von Hatzfeldt-Trachenberg
26. Count Friedrich Wilhelm von der Schulenburg-Kehnert
13. Countess Friederike Karoline von der Schulenburg-Kehnert
27. Helene Sophie Wilhelmine von Arnstedt
3. Countess Louise von Hatzfeldt-Trachenberg
28. Marquis Boniface Louis André de Castellane
14. Marquis Esprit Victor Elisabeth Boniface de Castellane
29. Adélaïde Louise Guyonne de Rohan-Chabot
7. Rachel Elisabeth Pauline de Castellane
30. Louis Greffulhe
15. Louise Cordélia Eucharis Greffulhe
31. Jeanne Pauline Randon de Pully

== Books and articles ==
- Adamthwaite, Anthony (1977). France and the Coming of the Second World War, 1936-1939. London: Taylor & Francis. ISBN 9781000352788.
- Colton, Joel (1987). Léon Blum Humanist in Politics. Durham: Duke University Press. ISBN 9780822307624.
- Crozier, Andrew J. (1988). Appeasement And Germany's Last Bid For Colonies. London: Macmillan. ISBN 9781349192557.
- Fink, Carole (Spring 1996). "The Weimar Republic and its "Minderheitenpolitik: Challenge to a Democracy?". German Politics & Society. 31 (1): 80–95.
- Delattre, Lucas (2007). A Spy at the Heart of the Third Reich The Extraordinary Story of Fritz Kolbe, America's Most Important Spy in World War II. New York: Grove Atlantic. ISBN 9780802196491.
- Duroselle, Jean-Baptiste (1979). France and the Nazi Threat The Collapse of French Diplomacy 1932-1939. New York: Enigma Books. ISBN 9781929631155.
- Jordan, Nicole (2002). The Popular Front and Central Europe The Dilemmas of French Impotence 1918-1940. Cambridge: Cambridge University Press. ISBN 9780521522427.
- Kirsch, Jonathan (2013). The Short, Strange Life of Herschel Grynszpan. New York: W.W. Norton.
- Martin, Benjamin F. (2006). France in 1938. Baton Rouge: LSU Press. ISBN 9780807131954.
- Schwab, Gerald S (1990). The Day the Holocaust Began The Odyssey of Herschel Grynszpan. Westport: Praeger. ISBN 9780275935764.
- Shirer, William (1960). The Rise and Fall of the Third Reich. New York: Simon and Schuster.
- Sater, William F.; Herwig, Holger H. (1999). The Grand Illusion The Prussianization of the Chilean Army. Lincoln: University of Nebraska Press. ISBN 9780803223936.
- Watt, D.C. (1989). How War Came: The Immediate Origins of the Second World War, 1938-1939. London: Heinemann.
- Weinberg, Gerhard (1980). The Foreign Policy of Hitler's Germany Starting World War II 1937-1939. Chicago: University of Chicago Press.
- Whealey, Robert H. (2004). Hitler and Spain: The Nazi Role in the Spanish Civil War, 1936-1939. Lexington: University Press of Kentucky. ISBN 0813191394.
