= Ernst vom Rath =

German diplomat (1909–1938)

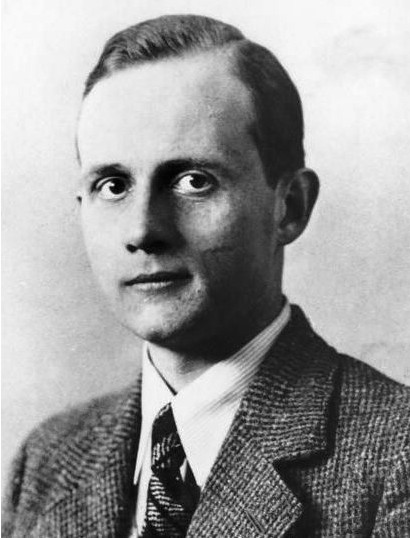
- Vom Rath in 1934
- Born: Ernst Eduard vom Rath; 3 June 1909; Frankfurt, Germany
- Died: 9 November 1938 (aged 29); Paris, France
- Cause of death: Assassination (gunshot wounds)
- Occupation: Diplomat
- Years active: 1932–1938
- Known for: His murder being cited as a pretext for Kristallnacht
- Political party: Nazi Party

Ernst Eduard vom Rath (3 June 1909 – 9 November 1938) was a German diplomat. He is mainly remembered for his assassination in Paris in 1938 by a Polish Jewish teenager, Herschel Grynszpan, which was used as a pretext for Kristallnacht, "The Night of Broken Glass" on 9–10 November 1938. Historians consider Kristallnacht the beginning of the Holocaust.

== Early life and career ==
Vom Rath was born in Frankfurt am Main to an aristocratic family, the son of a high-ranking public official, Gustav vom Rath. He attended a school in Breslau, and then studied law at Bonn, Munich and Königsberg, until 1932, when he joined the Nazi Party and became a career diplomat. In April 1933, he became a member of the SA, the party's paramilitary unit. In 1935, after a posting in Bucharest, he was posted to the German embassy in Paris as its third secretary. Regarding the "Jewish Question", Rath expressed regret that the German Jews had to suffer but argued that anti-Semitic laws were "necessary" to allow the Volksgemeinschaft to flourish.

== Assassination and motives ==
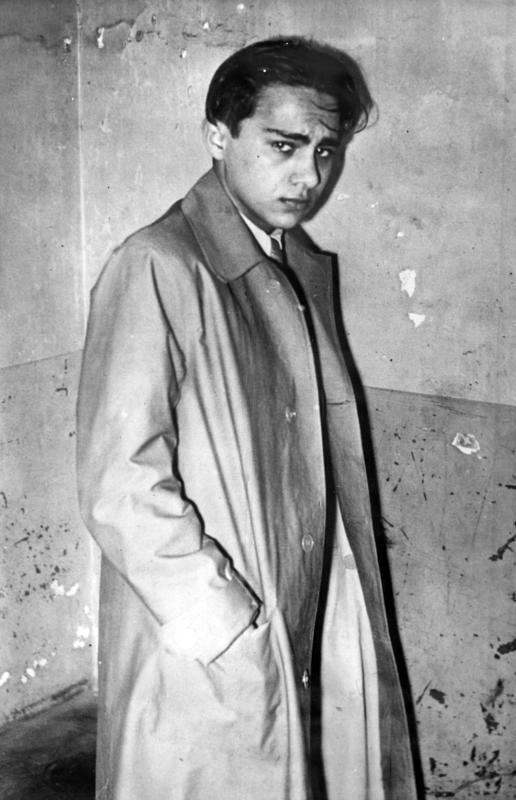
Herschel Grynszpan in Paris just after his arrest (7 November 1938)

On the morning of November 7, 1938, 17-year-old Polish Jew Herschel Grynszpan, who had learned of the deportation of his parents from Germany to the Polish frontier, went to the German embassy in Paris and asked to speak with an embassy official. Grynszpan shot the 29-year-old vom Rath five times, mortally wounding him with bullets to the spleen, stomach and pancreas.

Adolf Hitler himself sent his two best doctors, personal physician Karl Brandt and surgeon Georg Magnus, to Paris to try to save vom Rath's life. Hitler promoted him to the rank of Legation Counsellor, First Class (Gesandtschaftsrat I. Klasse), hours before vom Rath's death on 9 November at 17:30 (5:30 p.m.). Kristallnacht was launched within hours.

Why Grynszpan, who had fled from Germany to France in 1936, shot vom Rath is not known with certainty, although he was upset over the news of his family's deportation from Germany back to Poland. As far as it can be established, Grynszpan and vom Rath did not know each other. Most accounts of the shooting state that Grynszpan did not ask for vom Rath by name but only asked to speak to a member of the diplomatic staff. The records were falsified in 1942, and the Germans spread propaganda that Grynszpan's intention was to kill the Nazi ambassador, Count Johannes von Welczeck.

Grynszpan, who was immediately arrested and confessed, insisted his motives were to avenge the Jewish people for the actions already taken by the Germans. He had a postcard on him written to his parents that read, "With God's help. My dear parents, I could not do otherwise, may God forgive me, the heart bleeds when I hear of your tragedy and that of the 12,000 Jews. I must protest so that the whole world hears my protest, and that I will do. Forgive me."

== Aftermath ==
Vom Rath was given a state funeral on 17 November in Düsseldorf, with Hitler and Foreign Minister Joachim von Ribbentrop among those in attendance. Germany used the incident to publicize that the Jews had "fired the first shot" in a war on Germany; in his funeral oration, Ribbentrop declared, "We understand the challenge, and we accept it."

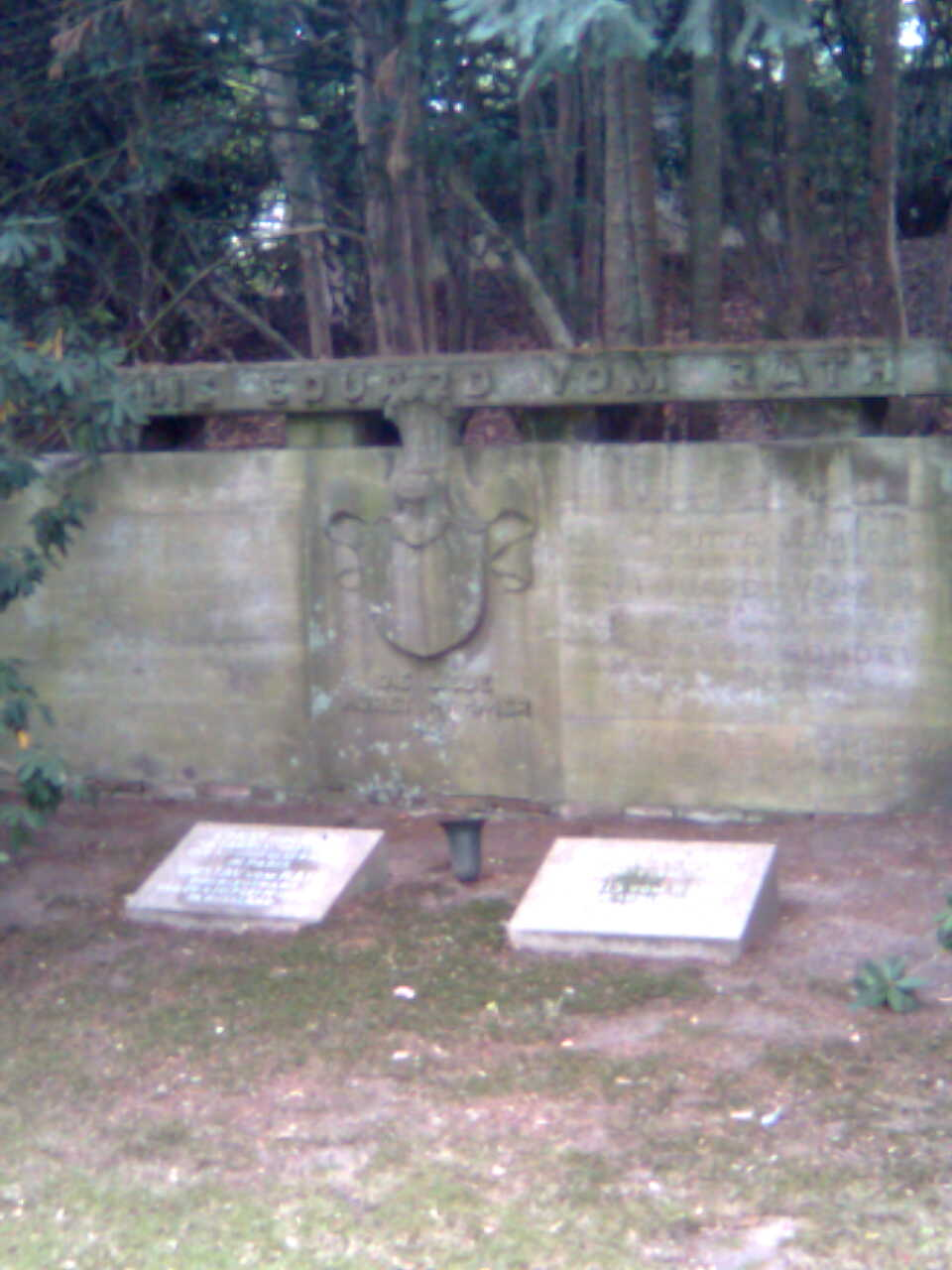
Ernst vom Rath's grave in Düsseldorf

American journalist Dorothy Thompson reported widely on the case and raised funds for Grynszpan's defence in his French trial, which never took place. Much to the fury of Grynszpan who wanted to use the "Jewish avenger" defense successfully used by Sholem Schwarzbard at his trial in 1927, Grynszpan's French lawyer Vincent de Moro-Giafferi wanted to use as the defense the allegation that Rath was a homosexual who had seduced Grynszpan, and that Grynszpan had killed Rath as a part of a lover's quarrel. Under French law, those convicted of murder for political reasons faced the death penalty, but those who committed a crime passionnel were usually given a lesser sentence.

Grynszpan initially escaped from prison when France fell in 1940, but he was captured by the Nazis and taken back to Germany. He was sent to the Sachsenhausen concentration camp to face a trial there, one that Joseph Goebbels planned to turn into Nazi propaganda about an international Jewish conspiracy and to claim it as evidence that Jews had started World War II.

However, the allegations emerged that vom Rath was a homosexual, and Goebbels learned that Grynszpan was intending to use this claim in his defence at the trial by implying that vom Rath had seduced him.

By 1941, various sources had made both the Ministry of Justice and the Reich Security Main Office aware that Ernst vom Rath was apparently active in Paris’s homosexual circles and had likely met Herschel Grynszpan there. This led to increasing internal reservations about proceeding with the trial. For instance, rumours about a homosexual relationship between vom Rath and Grynszpan were already circulating as early as late 1938, particularly in the circles of André Gide. The quotations from Gide were suggested to be incorrectly attributed by Corinne Chaponnière in 2015. Additionally, Ernst vom Rath’s brother was convicted on 6 June 1941, for "fornication with men".

It cannot be ruled out that vom Rath and Grynszpan indeed knew each other and that the murder of vom Rath may have been preceded by blackmail—for example, involving money or travel documents—a theory supported by statements from Grynszpan’s parents.

In 2001, Professor Hans-Jürgen Döscher alleged in an updated edition of his 1988 book, “Reichskristallnacht:” die November-Pogrome 1938, that Vom Rath was nicknamed "Mrs Ambassador" and "Notre Dame de Paris" as a result of his homosexual activities. He claims that the pair met at the Le Boeuf sur le Toit bar, a popular spot for homosexuals at the time and became intimate. He argues that vom Rath promised to secure papers for Grynszpan, but went back on his word, leading to the incident. This is a subject of dispute.

Grynszpan planned to claim that vom Rath was his pimp and he had been sent to be with various diplomats (although Grynszpan later stated this to be false in an encrypted letter sent from Sachsenhausen).

The homosexuality accusations threatened to humiliate the Nazis. Goebbels wrote that "Grynszpan has invented the insolent argument that he had a homosexual relationship with... vom Rath. That is, of course, a shameless lie; however, it is thought out very cleverly and would, if brought out in the course of a public trial, certainly become the main argument of enemy propaganda."

The trial was planned for 1942 but never took place, primarily because the Nazis (who also sent homosexuals to concentration camps) feared it would turn into a gay scandal.

Grynszpan's ultimate fate is unknown but he probably died in Sachsenhausen concentration camp. The last documentation indicating he was alive, or thought to be alive, was a Foreign Ministry memorandum on 7 December 1942. In 1960, at the request of his parents in Israel, the lower district court in Hanover officially declared Grynszpan deceased, listing his date of death as 8 May 1945 (the date of the German surrender to the Allies).

== See also ==
- Wilhelm Gustloff, Nazi killed in 1936 by David Frankfurter
