= Assassination in Davos =

1974 film

Konfrontation
- Directed by: Rolf Lyssy
- Written by: Georg Janett; Rolf Lyssy
- Produced by: Rolf Lyssy
- Starring: Peter Bollag; Gert Haucke; Marianne Kehlau; Hilde Ziegler
- Cinematography: Fritz E. Mäder
- Edited by: Georg Janett
- Music by: Arthur Paul Huber
- Release date: 1974
- Running time: 110 minutes
- Country: Switzerland

Assassination in Davos (German: Konfrontation) is a 1974 Swiss thriller film directed by Rolf Lyssy and starring Peter Bollag, Gert Haucke and Marianne Kehlau. It is based on the assassination of the Swiss Nazi Wilhelm Gustloff by David Frankfurter in 1936. The film was selected as the Swiss entry for the Best Foreign Language Film at the 48th Academy Awards, but was not accepted as a nominee.

== Cast ==
- Peter Bollag – David Frankfurter
- Gert Haucke – Wilhelm Gustloff
- Marianne Kehlau – Frau Hedwig Gustloff
- Hilde Ziegler – Doris Steiger
- Wolfram Berger – Zvonko
- Michael Rittermann – Rabbi Frankfurter
- Alfred Schlageter – Rabbi Salomon
- Peter Arens – Procureur de l'État
- Max Knapp – President de la Cour

== See also ==
- List of submissions to the 48th Academy Awards for Best Foreign Language Film
- List of Swiss submissions for the Academy Award for Best Foreign Language Film
