= Corinne Chaponnière =

Swiss-Canadian writer and journalist

- Born: 3 March 1954 (age 72); Montreal, Quebec
- Occupations: Journalist, writer, women's rights activist
- Notable work: Le mystère féminin; La Mixité: des hommes et des femmes féminin; Vingt siècles de déni de sens; Henry Dunand, la croix d'un homme; Les quatre coups de la nuit de cristal

Corinne Chaponnière (born 3 March 1954) is a Swiss-Canadian writer and journalist.

== Biography ==
Corinne Chaponnière was born on 3 March 1954. She spent her childhood in Montreal, Canada, and later in Geneva, Switzerland, where she studied. In 1978, she graduated in politics and literature. She also obtained a doctorate from the University of Geneva in 1988. Her thesis title was "The feminine mystery, a 20th century Long Denial of Meaning".

Chaponnière started her career as a freelance journalist for the Swiss newspaper La Suisse before becoming the chief editor of the feminist periodical Femmes Suisses, later renamed L'Émilie. L'Émilie is the oldest European feminist newspaper, and was founded by Emilie Gourd in 1912 under the name Le Mouvement Féministe.

After a short period writing for the judicial column of the Journal de Genève, Chaponnière joined the Swiss francophone television company Télévision Suisse Romande (TSR). Between 1983 and 1993, she was a reporter for the TV shows Tell Quel, Temps présent, and Viva. She served as a TSR correspondent between 1993 and 1997 in Brussels, Belgium in charge of European issues.

In 2005, she published a history of (gender) mixité with her sister Martine Chaponnière.

She sits on the board of the Société de Lecture of Geneva, an association which was founded in 1818 to provide resources not offered by the public library system and to offer a place of intellectual exchanges. The SDl organises conferences and talks with notorious authors, and is an active partner of the local literature scene.

== Works ==
=== Le mystère féminin ===
In this essay, Chaponnière explored the impossible reconciliation of the traditional roles assigned to the feminine identity, evolving between seduction and maternity. The feminine mystery can be seen as an attempt to deny a specific and intentional meaning to anything tagged as feminine, attempt which was largely used in the romantic literature but emanates from more ancient traditions.

=== Women and peace exhibition ===
In 2002, she organized an exhibition on women, peace and war, which lead to the publication of a catalog. This initiative was meant to explore the engagement of women in favor of peace.

=== Mixity: of men and women, a history of mixity ===
She published in 2005 with her sister Martine Chaponnière a history of mixity. The book recalls the history of fixity between men and women since medieval times and provides insights on the way mixity is treated in education, society, and the professional and political world.

=== Biography of Henry Dunant ===
Between 2005 and 2009, after writing a film script with Claude Goretta on the life of Henry Dunant, the founder of the Red Cross (the film was not made), she published a biography of the humanist in 2010. The book was published at the Perrin editions. The biography recalls the positive and negative aspects of the man, so as not to constitute just another hagiography according to the author's own words. Thus it does not forget the failings of the man, a notorious snob and megalomaniac, which she describes as the reverse side of his qualities.

=== Historical essay on Kristallnacht ===
One of her essays published in 2015 portrays the murder of Ernst vom Rath, which served as an excuse for the Nazis to start the pogroms against the Jews known as Kristallnacht. She confronts the different versions to explain the murderer Herschel Grynszpan's motives.

== Selected works ==
- Chaponnière, Corinne (1989). Le mystère féminin, Vingt siècles de déni de sens. Olivier Orban. ISBN 978-2855655000.
- Chaponnière, Corinne (2005). La Mixité: des hommes et des femmes féminin. Folio (Gallimard). ISBN 978-2884749084.
- Chaponnière, Corinne (2010). Henry Dunand, la croix d'un homme. Editions Perrin. ISBN 978-2262031039.
- Chaponnière, Corinne (2015). Les quatre coups de la nuit de cristal. Albin Michel. ISBN 978-2226314901.

== Bibliography ==
- Reilly, Niamh; Scriver, Stacey (26 November 2013). Religion, Gender, and the Public Sphere. Routledge. ISBN 978-1-135-01425-4.
