= Marianne Kehlau =

German actress

Marianne Kehlau (1925–2002) was a German actress.

== Selected filmography ==
- Die Verrohung des Franz Blum (1974)
- Assassination in Davos (1975)
- Tadellöser & Wolff (1975)
- Sonderdezernat K1 (1972)
- Tatort (1970)
