= David Frankfurter =

Jewish-Croatian assassin of Nazi leader Wilhelm Gustloff

- דוד פרנקפורטר
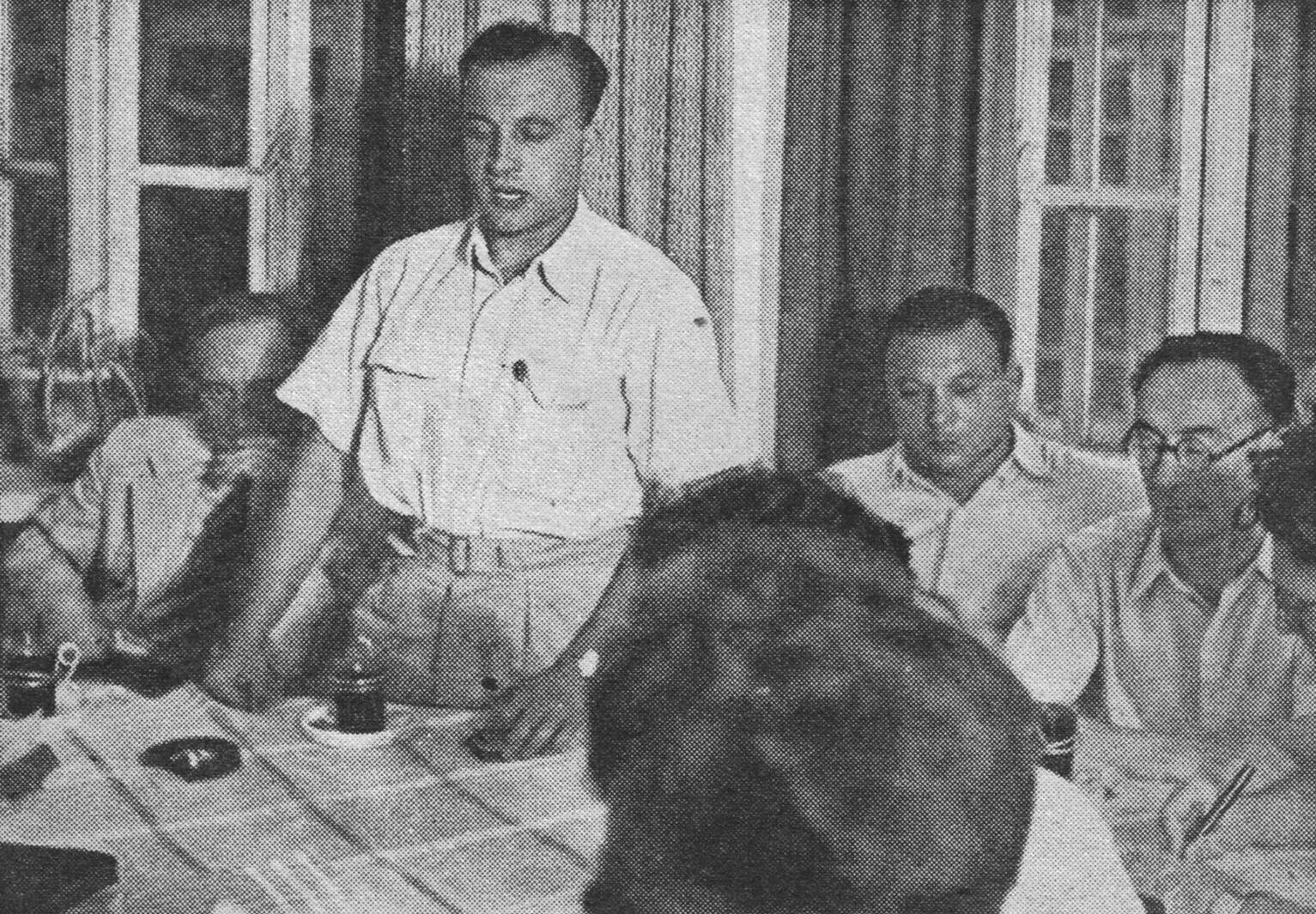
- Frankfurter in Tel Aviv, 1945
- Born: 9 July 1909; Daruvar, Kingdom of Croatia-Slavonia, Austria-Hungary
- Died: 19 July 1982 (aged 73); Ramat Gan, Israel
- Citizenship: Austria-Hungary; Kingdom of Yugoslavia; Israel
- Parents: Mavro Frankfurter; Rebekka-Rivka Figel

David Frankfurter (Hebrew: דוד פרנקפורטר; 9 July 1909 – 19 July 1982) was a Croatian Jew known for assassinating Wilhelm Gustloff, the founder and leader of the Swiss branch of the Nazi Party, in February 1936 in Davos, Switzerland. He surrendered and confessed, telling the police that "I fired the shots because I am a Jew."

Frankfurter was sentenced to 18 years in prison for murder. Shortly after V-E Day, he was granted a parliamentary pardon and released. As he left prison, sympathetic crowds cheered him as a hero.

== Background, family and education ==
Frankfurter was born in Daruvar, Croatia (then part of the Austro-Hungarian Empire and later part of Yugoslavia for years), to a Jewish family: father Mavro and mother Rebekka (née Figel) Frankfurter. His father was a rabbi in Daruvar and later the chief rabbi in Vinkovci, where the Frankfurter family relocated in 1914. Frankfurter was a sickly child and suffered an incurable periostitis for which he underwent seven operations between the ages of six and twenty-three. His doctors feared he would not live a normal lifespan. He graduated from elementary and later secondary school, in 1929, with high marks.

After completing his basic education, he began studying medicine. His father sent him to Germany to study dentistry, first in Leipzig and then in 1931 in Frankfurt, the town of his ancestors.

== Shooting of Gustloff ==
While studying in Germany, Frankfurter witnessed the Nazis coming to power and their imposition of anti-semitic measures. The rise of Nazism in Germany and the banning of Jews from German universities compelled him to move to Switzerland to continue his studies, and he settled in Bern in 1934. There among the Germans and German-speaking Swiss, the Nazi movement gained ground, led by Wilhelm Gustloff. Having become convinced of the danger posed by the Nazis, Frankfurter kept an eye on Gustloff, head of the Foreign Section of the Nazi Party in Switzerland (NSDAP). The latter man ordered the propaganda piece Protocols of the Elders of Zion (1903) to be published there for distribution.

Motivated by such insults and attacks on Jewish people, Frankfurter bought a gun in Bern in 1936 and resolved to assassinate Gustloff. Frankfurter found Gustloff's address, which was listed in the phone book. On 4 February 1936, he went to the Gustloff home; Gustloff's wife Hedwig received him and showed him into the study, asking him to wait since her husband was on the telephone.

When Gustloff, who was in the adjoining room, entered his office where Frankfurter was sitting opposite a picture of Adolf Hitler, the young man pulled out his revolver and shot Gustloff five times: in the head, neck and chest. He left the premises and prepared to commit suicide. However, he was unable to follow through, and instead turned himself in to the police.

The assassination of Gustloff was widely publicized throughout Europe, especially due to Nazi propaganda directed by Joseph Goebbels. Adolf Hitler prohibited an immediate retaliation against the Jews of Germany at the time, fearing an international boycott of the winter and summer Olympics that were due to be held in Germany. He wanted to use the Games to promote propaganda on the world stage about the size, power and ideology of the Nazi movement. Nevertheless, an editorial on the front page of Völkischer Beobachter demanded Frankfurter's execution.

Gustloff was declared a Blutzeuge/Blood Martyr of the Nazi cause. His assassination was later used in propaganda, serving as pretext, along with Herschel Grynszpan's assassination of German diplomat Ernst vom Rath, for the 1938 Kristallnacht pogrom. While most people in Switzerland were sympathetic towards Frankfurter, the Swiss government prosecuted the case strictly. It wanted to maintain its position of neutrality. Frankfurter was convicted of murder and sentenced to 18 years in prison and subsequent expulsion from the country. His father visited his son in prison and asked him, "Who actually needed this?"

In 1941, as the Nazis occupied Vinkovci, Frankfurter's father was forced to stand on a table while the German soldiers spat in his face, pulled out hair from his long beard, and struck him with their rifle butts. Frankfurter's father was later killed by Ustaše in the Jasenovac concentration camp during the Holocaust.

As the Second World War came to an end, Frankfurter applied for a pardon on 27 February 1945. The Swiss press was overwhelmingly in favor of clemency, which was granted on 17 May, by a vote of 78 to 12. However, he still had to leave the country and pay restitution and court costs for his case. As Frankfurter left prison, sympathetic crowds cheered him as a hero, chanting, "God bless you."

In 1969, the cantonal parliament of Graubünden revoked the expulsion.

== Later years and emigration to Palestine ==
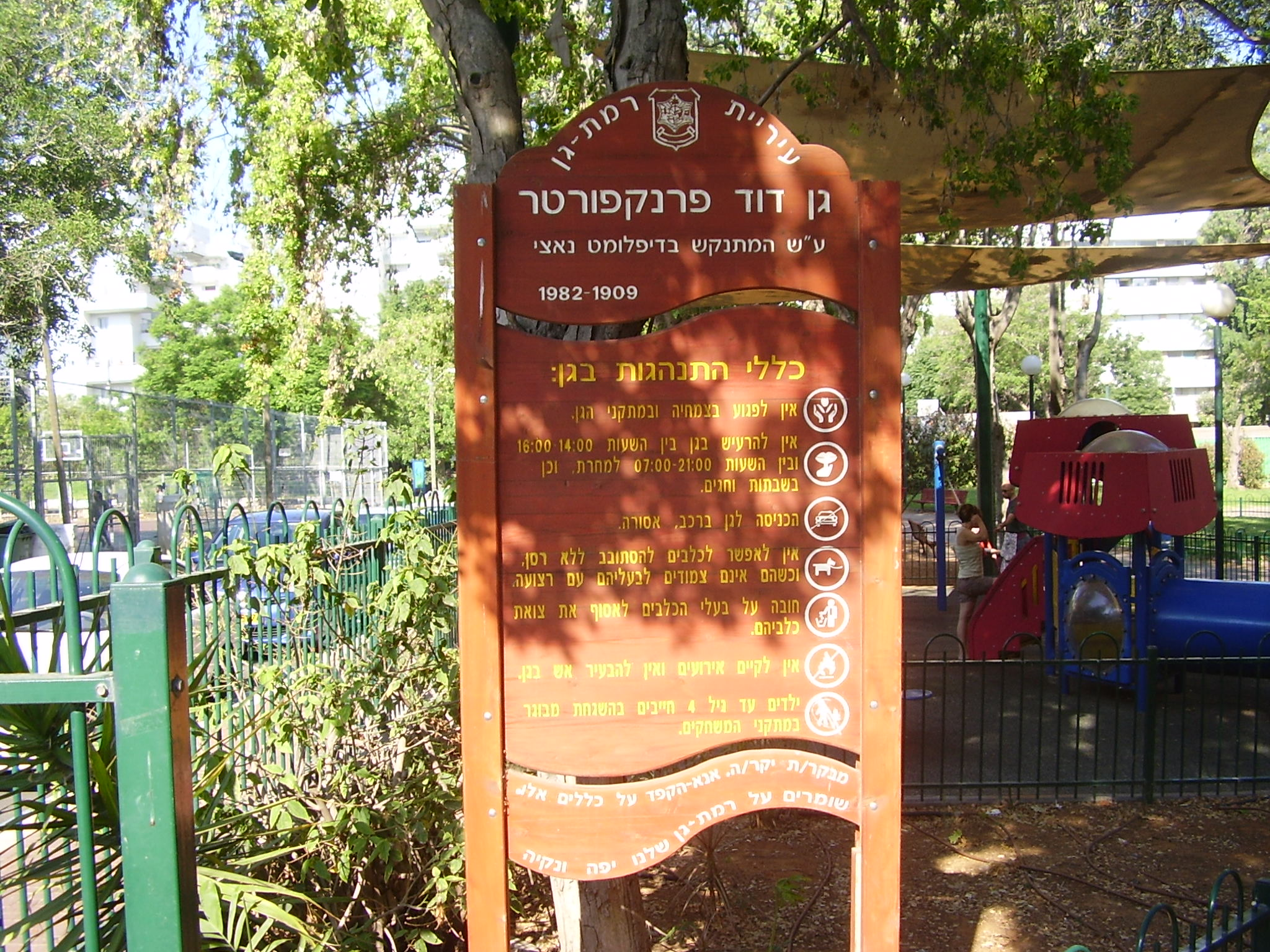
David Frankfurter garden in Ramat Gan.

After his release from prison, Frankfurter had to leave Switzerland, and he migrated to the British Mandate of Palestine.

There Frankfurter settled in Tel Aviv. He later became an employee of the Israeli Minister of Defence and later an officer in the Israeli Army. He lived and worked in several Israeli cities until his death in 1982.

== Death ==
Frankfurter died in Israel, in the city of Ramat Gan on 19 July 1982, aged 73.

== Legacy and representation in media ==
Several books were written about the Gustloff assassination. Frankfurter himself published two memoirs about his life: The first, in German, was called Rache ("revenge"); and the second, in English, was titled The First Fighter against Nazism.

Frankfurter's assassination of Gustloff is the subject of the Swiss film Assassination in Davos (1975), which gives an account of events. Much of the film is devoted to Frankfurter's trial. The film ends with documentary footage of David Frankfurter living in Israel.

In Israel, Frankfurter has been hailed as a hero. After his death, several cities named streets and parks after him.
