= Alan E. Steinweis =

American historian

Alan Edward Steinweis (born January 15, 1957, in Brooklyn, New York) is an American historian and a professor at the University of Vermont.

== Life ==
Steinweis earned his doctorate in 1988 at the University of North Carolina at Chapel Hill under Gerhard L. Weinberg. As a PhD student Steinweis was a fellow at the University of Bonn and a postdoctoral fellow at the Free University of Berlin. He was a guest professor in 2000 at the Ben Gurion University in Israel, in 2002 at the University of Hannover and in 2003 at the University of Heidelberg. In 1993 he joined the University of Nebraska–Lincoln, as the Hyman Rosenberg Professor of Modern European History and Judaic Studies in the Department of History. In 2011, he was invited for a sabbatical at the Fritz Bauer Institute in Frankfurt. In 2012, Steinweis was appointed Leonard and Carolyn Miller Distinguished Professor of Holocaust Studies at the University of Vermont, where he also serves as Director of Carolyn and Leonard Miller Center for Holocaust Studies.

== Publications ==
- The People's Dictatorship: A History of Nazi Germany. Cambridge University Press, 2023, ISBN 978-1-107-65284-2.
- Kristallnacht 1938, Harvard University Press, 2009, ISBN 978-0-674-03623-9
- Studying the Jew: Scholarly Antisemitism in Nazi Germany, Harvard University Press, 2006 ISBN 978-0-674-02205-8
- Art, Ideology, and Economics in Nazi Germany: The Reich Chambers of Music, Theater, and the Visual Arts, University of North Carolina Press, 1993 ISBN 978-0-8078-4607-0
- Edited with Daniel E. Rogers: The Impact of Nazism: New Perspectives on the Third Reich and Its Legacy, 2003, ISBN 978-0-8032-4299-9
- Edited with Philipp Gassert: Coping with the Nazi Past, 2006 ISBN 978-1-84545-086-1

His book Studying the Jew was a Finalist for the National Jewish Book Award in the Holocaust category. He is editor of the American edition of the Comprehensive History of the Holocaust, a monograph series published by the University of Nebraska Press in cooperation with Yad Vashem, the Holocaust research and commemoration authority of the state of Israel. He is currently writing a book on the November 1938 Kristallnacht pogrom in Germany, which will be published by Harvard University Press.
