= Hans-Jürgen Döscher =

German historian

Hans-Jürgen Döscher (born November 18, 1943, in Eberswalde, Province of Brandenburg) is a German historian. Döscher has written many articles about Nazism and anti-Semitism, mostly for the Frankfurter Allgemeine Zeitung. He has made nine television documentaries including programs about foreign minister Joachim von Ribbentrop in the 1997 series Hitler's Helpers on German TV network ZDF.

Döscher studied history, political science and romance studies in Hamburg and Bordeaux from 1968 to 1973. He earned his doctorate at the University of Hamburg. Since 2006 he has been Honorary Professor of Contemporary History at the University of Osnabrück. According to the news magazine Der Spiegel his two studies of the Foreign Office during the Third Reich in 1987 qualify as the "standard works on the wartime ministry". He has been described by one commentator as "Germany's foremost authority" on the events of November 9, 1938, known as Kristallnacht.

== Works ==
Döscher's books and articles include:

- The Foreign Office during the Third Reich. Diplomacy in the shadow of the "Final Solution." Siedler Verlag, Berlin, 1987, ISBN 3-88680-256-6.
- "Kristallnacht". The pogroms of November 1938. 1 Edition. Econ, Frankfurt, 1988, ISBN 3-550-07495-6.
- Conspirators society. The Federal Foreign Office under Adenauer between new beginning and continuity. Academy, Berlin 1995, ISBN 3-05-002655-3.
- Cliques. The repressed past the Foreign Ministry. Propylaea, Berlin 2005, ISBN 3-549-07267-8.
- "Struggle against Judaism". Gustav Stille 1845-1920. Anti-Semite in the German Empire. Metropol, Berlin 2008, ISBN 978-3-938690-90-1.
