= Wilhelm Gustloff =

German politician and meteorologist

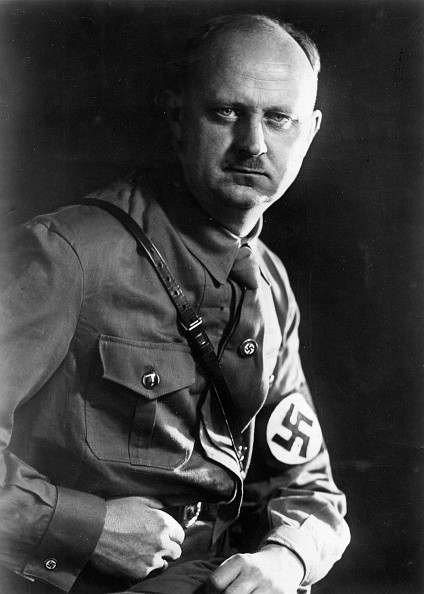

Personal details
- Born: 30 January 1895 Schwerin, Germany
- Died: 4 February 1936 (aged 41) Davos, Switzerland
- Occupation: head of the Swiss NSDAP/AO

Wilhelm Gustloff (30 January 1895 – 4 February 1936) was a German politician and meteorologist who founded the Swiss branch of the Nazi Party/Foreign Organization (NSDAP/AO) at Davos in 1932. The NSDAP/AO was formed as the wing of the Nazi Party (NSDAP) for German citizens living outside Germany. Gustloff continued to lead the Swiss branch of the NSDAP/AO until 1936, when he was assassinated by David Frankfurter, a Croatian Jew who was outraged by the growth of the Nazi Party. After killing Gustloff, Frankfurter immediately surrendered to the authorities and confessed to the Swiss police that "I fired the shots because I am a Jew."

== Life and assassination ==
Gustloff was a son of merchant Herrmann Gustloff and his wife. After his education, he worked for the Swiss government as a meteorologist. He joined the Deutschvölkischer Schutz- und Trutzbund, a large and influential antisemitic organization in 1921, and joined the Nazi Party in 1927. From 1932 to his death in 1936, he headed the (NSDAP/AO) in Switzerland. He assisted in the distribution of the antisemitic propaganda book The Protocols of the Elders of Zion (1903). Members of the Swiss Jewish community sued the book's distributor, the Swiss NSDAP/AO, for libel.

Gustloff was shot and killed in Davos by David Frankfurter, a Yugoslav Jewish student (from what is now Croatia), who was incensed by the growth of the NSDAP and resolved to assassinate Gustloff.

Frankfurter found Gustloff's address, which was listed in the phone book. On 4 February, he went to the Gustloff home; Gustloff's wife Hedwig received him and showed him into the study, asking him to wait since her husband was on the telephone.

When Gustloff, who was in the adjoining room, entered his office where Frankfurter was sitting opposite a picture of Adolf Hitler, the young man pulled out his revolver and shot Gustloff five times: in the head, neck and chest. He left the premises and prepared to commit suicide. However, he was unable to follow through.

Frankfurter surrendered immediately to the Swiss police, confessing "I fired the shots because I am a Jew". Unlike Maurice Conradi, who killed a Soviet diplomat in Lausanne in 1923 with similar political motives, he was convicted and sentenced to 18 years imprisonment.

He was incarcerated during the war years in a Swiss prison. On May 17, 1945 — shortly after V-E Day — Frankfurter was pardoned by a Swiss court.

== Aftermath ==
Gustloff was given a state funeral in his birthplace of Schwerin in Mecklenburg, with Adolf Hitler, Joseph Goebbels, Hermann Göring, Heinrich Himmler, Martin Bormann and Joachim von Ribbentrop in attendance. Thousands of Hitler Youth members lined the route. His coffin, transported on a special train from Davos to Schwerin, made stops in Stuttgart, Würzburg, Erfurt, Halle, Magdeburg and Wittenberg. Gustloff's widow, mother and brother attended the funeral and received personal condolences from Hitler. Ernst Wilhelm Bohle was the first at Gustloff's funeral to recite a few lines in his honour.

Gustloff was proclaimed a Blutzeuge of the Nazi cause. His murder became part of the propaganda that served as pretext for the 1938 Kristallnacht pogrom. His wife Hedwig, who had been Hitler's secretary, received from Hitler personally a monthly "honorary pay" of 400 ℛ︁ℳ︁, the equivalent of some US$13,000 today. The urn containing his ashes was placed inside a foundation of an erected boulder as part of a monument in a memorial grove that commemorated him and other German war martyrs, in Schwerin. The monument and boulder was destroyed in 1947 as part of denazification following World War II.

Unlike the assassination of the German diplomat Ernst vom Rath by Herschel Grynszpan in Paris in 1938, Gustloff's death was not immediately politicized to incite the Kristallnacht. Hitler did not want to risk any domestic bouts of antisemitism to cause Germany to lose the recently awarded right to host the 1936 Summer Olympics. His antisemitic policies had already led to some calls to relocate the games. Nevertheless, an editorial on the front page of Völkischer Beobachter demanded Frankfurter's execution.

=== Namesakes ===
The German cruise ship MV Wilhelm Gustloff was named for Gustloff by the Nazi regime. The ship was sunk by the Soviet submarine S-13 on 30 January 1945 (coincidentally the 50th anniversary of her namesake's birth) in the Baltic Sea while carrying civilian refugees and military personnel fleeing from the advancing Red Army. About 9,400 people died, the greatest death toll from the sinking of a single vessel in human history. The disaster remains relatively unknown.

On 27 May 1936 the Nazi Party created the Wilhelm-Gustloff-Stiftung ("The Wilhelm Gustloff Foundation"), a national corporation funded by properties and wealth confiscated from Jews. It ran the Gustloff Werke ("Gustloff Factories"), a group of businesses that had been confiscated from their Jewish owners or partners.

The small arms factory Berlin Suhler Waffen und Fahrzeugwerke was renamed Wilhelm Gustloff Werke in Gustloff's honour in 1939.

== See also ==
- Assassination in Davos, a 1975 Swiss feature film concerning the assassination.
- Crabwalk – the assassination of Gustloff is an element of the plot of this 2002 novel, even though its main subject is the sinking of the passenger ship named in his memory.
- Herbert Norkus
- Horst Wessel
- List of Nazis who died in the Beer Hall Putsch
