= Ilse Stanley =

German-American writer

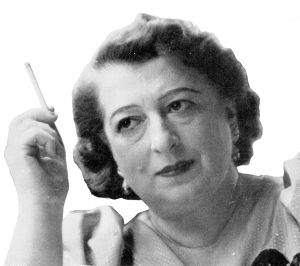
- Born: Ilse Friederike Davidsohn; March 11, 1906; Gleiwitz, Germany
- Died: July 19, 1970 (aged 64); Boston, Massachusetts, U.S.
- Other names: Ilse Davis (stage name); Ilse Intrator; Ilse F. Stanley
- Citizenship: German; American (1945)
- Spouse(s): Alexander Intrator (m. 1932) Milton Stanley (m. 1946)
- Children: Manfred Stanley (1932–2004)
- Parent: Magnus Davidsohn

Ilse (Intrator) Stanley (née Ilse Davidsohn; March 11, 1906 – July 21, 1970), was a German Jewish woman who, with the collusion of a handful of people ranging from Nazi members of the Gestapo to other Jewish civilians, secured the release of 412 Jewish prisoners from Nazi concentration camps between 1936 and 1938.

During that time she also helped countless others leave the country while it was still possible for German Jews to do so legally. This story was sketched publicly in 1955 on Ralph Edwards's television program, This Is Your Life, and is told in vivid detail in Stanley's autobiographical book, The Unforgotten, which was published in the United States in 1957.

== Early life ==
Ilse was born in 1906 in the small mining town of Gleiwitz, Germany. The family moved to Berlin when her father, Magnus Davidsohn, was named as the main cantor at the new Fasanenstraße Synagogue being built in the Charlottenburg section of Berlin. The first time she entered the still-unfinished building, Ilse fell deeply in love with this synagogue (which she called "my House") and her life became thoroughly entwined with this synagogue. As a child of six she had the honor of presenting flowers to the German Emperor, Kaiser Wilhelm, when he came to dedicate the new temple, which opened on August 26, 1912.

Ilse graduated from the Auguste-Viktoria-Schule (in Charlottenburg) at the age of fifteen. After graduation she continued to study theatre history and theatre science at the Theatre Science Institute and at the Berlin University, while working part-time as a bookkeeper and office manager. Later she studied acting and directing at the Max Reinhardt's Deutsches Theater (Berlin) and elsewhere. Using the stage name "Ilse Davis", her primary interest was in acting on the stage, although she also played bit parts in several films, including Fritz Lang's Metropolis. Her interest and ambition broadened to include directing and producing, and in 1929, just after turning twentythree, she opened her own theatre organization. In this endeavor she handled everything from theatre production, promotion and publicity, to public relations; she also ran an academy where entrants were taught acting, directing, and production.

Her acting career ended abruptly in 1933, however, as increasing pressure was put on the Jews by Hitler and his Third Reich and she was no longer able to rent theatres and concert halls. For the next three years, until 1936, she gave recital tours, speaking to her fellow Jews "wherever I was permitted to speak."

== Concentration camps ==
Unable to work at what she loved, and having no hope for matters to improve in the foreseeable future, Ilse became quite discouraged. In 1936, an unexpected set of circumstances led to her making a trip to Sachsenhausen concentration camp, posing as a social worker and under an assumed name. With falsified release papers, she secured the liberation of her cousin's husband.

The story of how Ilse accomplished this is interesting enough to tell in full:
In 1936, a cousin of Ilse's came to Berlin to consult a lawyer about getting her husband released from a concentration camp. The cousin had not yet realized the seriousness of Germany's situation, in which law and order was simply not operating. In the ensuing conversation, both women became distraught. After much soul-searching and a visit to her beloved Synagogue, Ilse reached a life-changing decision. Putting her faith in the "goodness even in people who have been taught nothing but evil" ^{p.68} against the odds of failure, she took her cousin to the Gestapo headquarters to look for help.

As they walked the halls with appropriately downcast eyes, they were stopped by an officer who took Ilse aside. As he questioned her closely about "Davis" and then "Ilse", she recognized "Fritz" (whose real name was Hans)—a theatre policeman from her acting days, for whose younger sister she had arranged a gala weekend in Berlin in honor of the girl's 16th birthday.

The two met later in a café, and Fritz explained to Ilse a plan he had devised. In the guise of a social worker and using the alias "Feldern", Ilse would hand-carry the release papers to the concentration camp and pick up the prisoner. Going in person had the essential element of surprise, which greatly increased the likelihood that the camp would actually release the prisoner, who might otherwise be quietly killed instead of released, particularly if he was in "unpresentable" condition.

The rules were stringent: a trusted Gentile chauffeur would drive Ilse to the Sachsenhausen concentration camp where her cousin's husband was held. She would enter alone, present the papers, and wait for the prisoner to be brought to her. If questioned about the papers, she would give the name of a (cooperating) high-placed Nazi lawyer, but say no more. No one must know when or where she was going, but a trusted, distant acquaintance—not a family member—would know when she was leaving and when to expect her return. If she did not return by the specified time, he was to call Fritz. No written record of any of her doings, or her information, could be kept longer than a day. Above all, under no circumstances must she ever show even the slightest reaction to any sight that might greet her on these trips.

She went, and she brought the prisoner home.

Having succeeded with this ruse on her first attempt, she continued rescue work for two more years. In order to have a cover-up office from which to do her work, and to provide a legitimate front for getting people out of Germany, she took a volunteer position with the vice-president of the Jewish Community, whom she calls "Mr. Gross" in her book. She worked in the Passports Office, on "the most hopeless" cases. In addition to working out passport issues for people and enabling many Jews to leave the country, she continued her trips to the camps, ultimately securing the release of 412 people before the devastating events of Kristallnacht (November 9, 1938).

== Kristallnacht and after: late 1938 and 1939 ==
After Kristallnacht, when more than 200 synagogues all over Germany—including Ilse's beloved "House"—were torched and destroyed, the situation worsened dramatically. By 1939 the Jewish population of Berlin, which had numbered 160,000 in 1933, had dwindled to 75,000. Trips to the camps were out of the question, but Ilse continued helping Jews leave the country legally. She kept in contact with "Fritz", and when the Gestapo began interviewing people planning to leave Germany in order to try to prevent them from leaving, he found a way to warn her. Finally, very reluctantly, Ilse realized that she, along with her family, needed to leave Germany. They left separately: first her father, in March 1939, then her husband, then Ilse and her son Manfred.

Five days before Ilse's planned departure, her mother was summoned to the Gestapo on Alexanderplatz. Ilse went in her stead. (Once again, her acting past unexpectedly surfaced: the younger of the two interrogators recognized her.) After her mother's situation was clarified, Ilse made a near-fatal mistake: she mentioned her own impending departure. Questioning ensued, and, having nothing to lose, Ilse spoke quietly and openly. She spoke of living in fear since Kristallnacht, and of the need to live without such fear. Then she talked about presenting flowers to the Emperor at the age of six, about Kaiser Wilhelm's abdication and flight from Germany on November 9, 1918, and about Kristallnacht, which happened exactly twenty years after the Emperor's flight (November 9, 1938). One of her two interrogators broke down sobbing. She was allowed to leave the office, and three days later, she and Manfred left for England. After a brief stop there, they sailed from Southampton on the SS Deutschland on August 4, 1939, arriving in the U.S. on August 11.

== Life in the United States ==
In her later years she moved to Boston, and then to New Hampshire, where she worked as an auctioneer. She died in Boston in 1970 and is buried in Gilmanton, New Hampshire in the Smith Meeting House cemetery.

Her grandson is Yale University Professor of Philosophy Jason Stanley.

== Recognition ==
Ilse's work extracting prisoners from the concentration camps has not received much public recognition. A notable exception to this is the 1955 episode of the American television program This Is Your Life, featuring Ilse and in particular her rescue work. On that program she was reunited with her father, Magnus Davidsohn, who had been living in England since he left Germany in 1939.

== Writings by Ilse Stanley ==
- Stanley, Ilse (1954). I Will Lift Up Mine Eyes. London: Victor Gollancz Ltd. pp. 224 pp. ASIN B0000CIXZ1. See a particularly nice Amazon customer review.
- Stanley, Ilse (28 December 1957). "The Stranger's Surprise". The Saturday Evening Post. 44 (11).

Reprinted in November/December 1992 issue, vol. 264:6.

- Stanley, Ilse (1957). The Unforgotten. [Boston, Mass. USA]: Beacon Press. pp. 375 pp. LCC PN2658.S75 A3.
- Stanley, Ilse (1964). Die Unvergessenen. München / Wien / Basel: Desch.
