= Jason Stanley =

American philosopher (born 1969)

- Born: October 12, 1969 (age 57); Syracuse, New York, U.S.

Education
- Education: Stony Brook University (BA); Massachusetts Institute of Technology (PhD)
- Thesis: Meaning and Metatheory (1995)
- Doctoral advisor: Robert Stalnaker

Philosophical work
- Sub-discipline: Epistemology; philosophy of language; political philosophy
- School: Analytic philosophy
- Institutions: Cornell University; University of Michigan; Rutgers University; Yale University; University of Toronto
- Notable works: How Fascism Works (2018)
- Notable ideas: Propaganda as a self-concealing feature of liberal democracies

Jason Stanley (born 1969) is an American philosopher who is the Bissell-Heyd Chair in American studies in the Munk School of Global Affairs & Public Policy at the University of Toronto, and also has an appointment in the Department of Philosophy. In addition to his position at the Munk School, he is a distinguished professor at the Kyiv School of Economics.

Before coming to the University of Toronto in 2025, he held positions as a professor of philosophy at Yale University (2013–2025), Rutgers University (2004–2013), the University of Michigan (2000–04), and Cornell University (1995–2000). He accepted the appointment at the University of Toronto in 2025, fleeing the U.S. because of what he describes as the deteriorating political situation.

In his academic work in philosophy, Stanley is best known for his contributions to philosophy of language and epistemology, which often draw upon and influence other fields, including linguistics and cognitive science. His work in epistemology has focused on the relationship between knowledge and action—arguing, for example that practical factors are relevant for knowledge (in his 2005 book Knowledge and Practical Interests), and that practical knowledge and theoretical knowledge cannot be separated (in influential work with Timothy Williamson as well as his 2011 book Know How; he has also co-authored in neuroscience on these topics with John Krakauer).

Stanley has brought tools from philosophy of language and epistemology to bear on questions of political philosophy—for example, in his 2015 book How Propaganda Works. His 2023 book, The Politics of Language, co-authored with the linguist David Beaver, is a reconceptualization of the foundations of the theory of linguistic meaning to center non-informational aspects of speech. A review from the journal Language puts the central question of the book, "What if we placed the analysis of slurs at the center of the study of linguistic meaning? What sort of theory would result?"

== Early life and education ==
Stanley was raised in Central New York in a Jewish family. He graduated from Corcoran High School in Syracuse, New York. During high school, he studied in Lünen, Germany, for one year as part of the Congress-Bundestag Youth Exchange. He enrolled initially at Binghamton University, where he studied philosophy of language under Jack Kaminsky. In 1987, he transferred to the University of Tübingen but returned to New York in 1988 at Stony Brook University. There he studied philosophy and linguistics under Peter Ludlow and Richard Larson. Stanley received a BA degree in May 1990. He later earned a PhD from Massachusetts Institute of Technology in January 1995, with Robert Stalnaker as his thesis advisor. He speaks German fluently, as heard in an interview on German public radio from May 2025.

== Career ==
After receiving his doctorate, Stanley accepted a position at University College, Oxford, as a stipendiary lecturer. He then returned to New York and taught at Cornell University until 2000. He was later appointed an associate professor of philosophy at the University of Michigan in Ann Arbor. In 2004, he moved to the department of philosophy at Rutgers University, where he taught from 2004 to 2013. In March 2013, he accepted a professorship at Yale University.

Stanley has written seven books, including How Propaganda Works (2015) and How Fascism Works (2018). Throughout his career, from the work collected in his 2007 book Language in Context, to his 2023 book The Politics of Language, he has bridged the disciplines of philosophy and linguistics. He has also contributed to epistemology. His books on political philosophy concern propaganda and fascism. Stanley's work in political philosophy often views contemporary politics and foreign affairs through the lens of Nazi Germany and the Holocaust. He has been interviewed by Vox, NPR, KCRW in Los Angeles, and WBUR in Boston, and appears regularly on MS NOW and other networks.

On March 28, 2025, Stanley accepted a position at the University of Toronto's Munk School of Global Affairs & Public Policy in Canada. He stated that he left the United States because of what he saw as America's descent into a fascist dictatorship. "I'll be in a much better position to fight bullies," he said.

== Personal life ==
Both of Stanley's parents immigrated to the United States from Europe—his father from Germany in 1939, and his mother from Poland in 1948; his mother and aunt are the only survivors of the Holocaust of their generation in their family. He grew up in upstate New York. He is the grandson of Ilse Stanley, who secured the release of 412 people from Nazi concentration camps between 1936 and 1938; he is also the great-grandson of the Berlin cantor Magnus Davidsohn. Stanley describes his Jewish background as informing his writing on fascism: "To me, my Judaism means an obligation to pay attention to equality and the rights of minority groups."

Stanley is divorced from cardiologist Njeri K. Thande, with whom he has two sons. In 2025, both Stanley and Thande chose to move to Canada. Stanley said, "We are leaving for our kids primarily so they can grow up under conditions of freedom." Stanley likened his departure for Canada to leaving Germany in 1932, 1933, and 1934. "I don't see it as fleeing at all," he said. "I see it as joining Canada, which is a target of Trump, just like Yale is a target of Trump." He told the Daily Nous, a professional philosophy website, that he decided "to raise my kids in a country that is not tilting towards a fascist dictatorship".

== Awards ==
His book Knowledge and Practical Interests won the 2007 American Philosophical Association book prize.

In 2016, Stanley earned a PROSE Award in philosophy for his book How Propaganda Works.

== Publications ==
- Stanley, Jason (2005). Knowledge and Practical Interests. Oxford: Oxford University Press. ISBN 978-0-19-922592-7.
- Stanley, Jason (2007). Language in Context: Selected Essays. Oxford: Oxford University Press. ISBN 978-0-19-923043-3.
- Stanley, Jason (2011). Know How. Oxford: Oxford University Press. ISBN 978-0-19969536-2.
- Stanley, Jason (2015). How Propaganda Works. Princeton, NJ: Princeton University Press. ISBN 978-069116442-7. - Article: How Propaganda Works
- Stanley, Jason (2018). How Fascism Works: The Politics of Us and Them. London: Penguin. ISBN 978-0-52551183-0. - Article: How Fascism Works
- Stanley, Jason; Beaver, David (2023). The Politics of Language. Princeton, NJ: Princeton University Press. ISBN 9780691181981.
- Stanley, Jason (2024). Erasing History: How Fascists Rewrite the Past to Control the Future. New York: Atria/One Signal Publishers. ISBN 978-1-6680-5691-2.

== See also ==
- Human capital flight from the United States of America
