= Irene Runge =

American-German-Jewish sociologist and writer

- Born: Irene Kuperman; November 3, 1942 (age 84); Washington Heights, Manhattan, New York, United States
- Occupations: Sociologist; Writer and journalist
- Spouse(s): 1. _____ Schrager; 2. Heinz Runge
- Children: Stefan Schrager
- Parent(s): Alexander Kuperman; Maria Krotz

Irene Runge (born Irene Kuperman, 3 November 1942 in New York City) is an American-German-Jewish sociologist, writer and commentator.

== Family provenance and early years ==
Irene Runge was born in Washington Heights, Manhattan, New York. Her German born father, Alexander Kupfermann (1901–1994) ran a book and picture shop in Times Square, down in the subway station, also working as a translator and journalist under the pseudonym Georg Friedrich Alexan. He had emigrated to Paris in 1931 as the political skies darkened in Germany, and he had relocated again, to the US in December 1937, anticipating the return to war in Europe which followed two years later. He had married Irene's mother, Maria Krotz in 1937. She had converted to Judaism ahead of their marriage which had taken place in Palestine, and although her parents were not strictly religious in their habits, awareness of her Jewishness has been a strong theme in her life.

== East Germany ==
Prompted by the rising tide of McCarthyism in the States, Alexander Kuperman took his family back to Germany in 1949, when Irene was 7. What remained of Germany had, since 1945, been divided into four military occupation zones. He took them not to Mannheim, which was where he had grown up and was now in the US occupation zone, but to Leipzig, which after 1945 had found itself in the Soviet occupation zone. In 1950 they relocated to Berlin where her father took a job with the Ministry of Information. Meanwhile, the Soviet occupation zone had been relaunched, in October 1949, as a new separated German state, the Soviet sponsored German Democratic Republic (East Germany). Her mother died in 1951, and during her school years, she and her father moved homes (within Berlin) several times. She attended the Carl von Ossietzky secondary school. Her father led a sociable life and had a large circle of intellectual friends: the home was always buzzing with visitors, although things became more difficult after her father remarried.

In 1959 she dropped out of school and moved in with her boyfriend's family. They married, their son was born and they divorced. She supported herself by undertaking filing and clerical work for the national press agency, interspersed with some writing and interpreting assignments: her former mother in law was more than happy to look after Stefan. She married her second husband, an opera director, in 1967. In 1968 she started attending evening classes in order to complete her schooling, obtaining her "Abitur" (the school leaving exam needed to gain a university place) in 1971.

== University ==
Between 1970 and 1975 Runge studied Sociology and Economics at Humboldt University of Berlin. She remained in Berlin for her doctorate which she received in 1979 for a dissertation on Social Aspects of Aging among the elderly ("Soziale Aspekte des Alterns im höheren und hohen Lebensalter"). She stayed on to undertake research work and teach Sociology till 1990 and was project leader for Social Gerontology.

Between 1983 and 1989 Irene Runge was an active member of the East Berlin Jewish Community. In 1986 she was one of a group of Jewish intellectuals who founded the group "Wir für uns - Juden für Juden" (Loosely: "Us for us: Jews for Jews"). At the start of 1990 this evolved into the Berlin Jewish Culture Association ("Jüdischer Kulturverein Berlin"). Runge was its first chairperson. It concentrated, primarily, on the migration of Jews from the successor states of the Soviet Union, and their cultural and social integration.

She lost her university post in 1990, shortly after reunification, when the opening up of the Ministry for State Security (Stasi) files indicated that for seventeen years she had been an "informal collaborator" ("Inoffizieller Mitarbeiter" / IM), identified in Stasi files as "IM Stefan". One case that came back to haunt her after three decades involved four of her acquaintances who had planned to leave the country in 1963. Leaving the country was illegal and, since the erection of the Berlin Wall two years earlier, had become very difficult. It later transpired that for Runge's friends the difficulties had been compounded because she had reported their escape plans to the Stasi. She had received 250 Marks for the information and her friends had received prison sentences.
