= Fasanenstrasse Synagogue =

Destroyed former Reform synagogue in Berlin, Germany

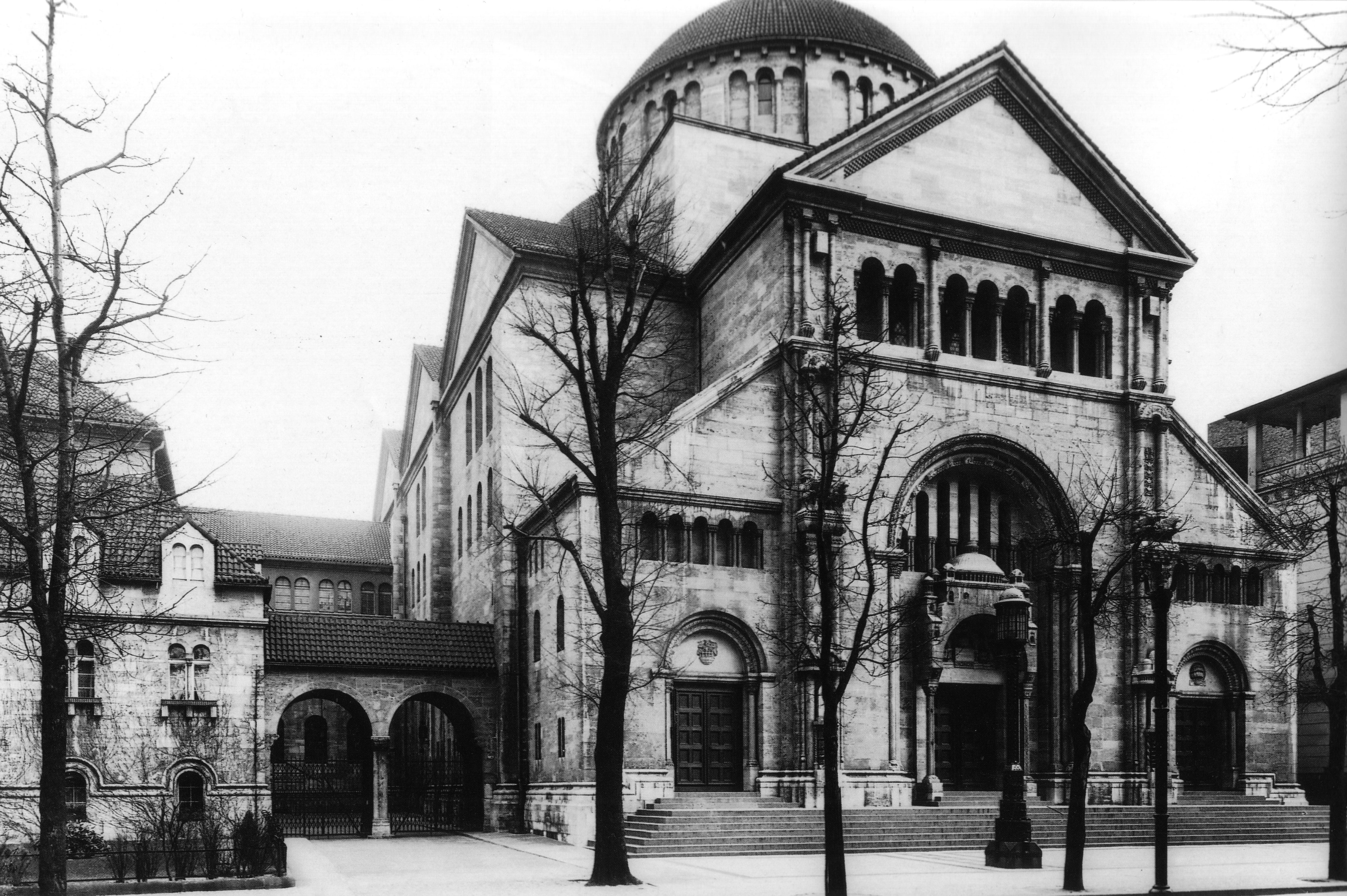
- The synagogue, in c. 1916

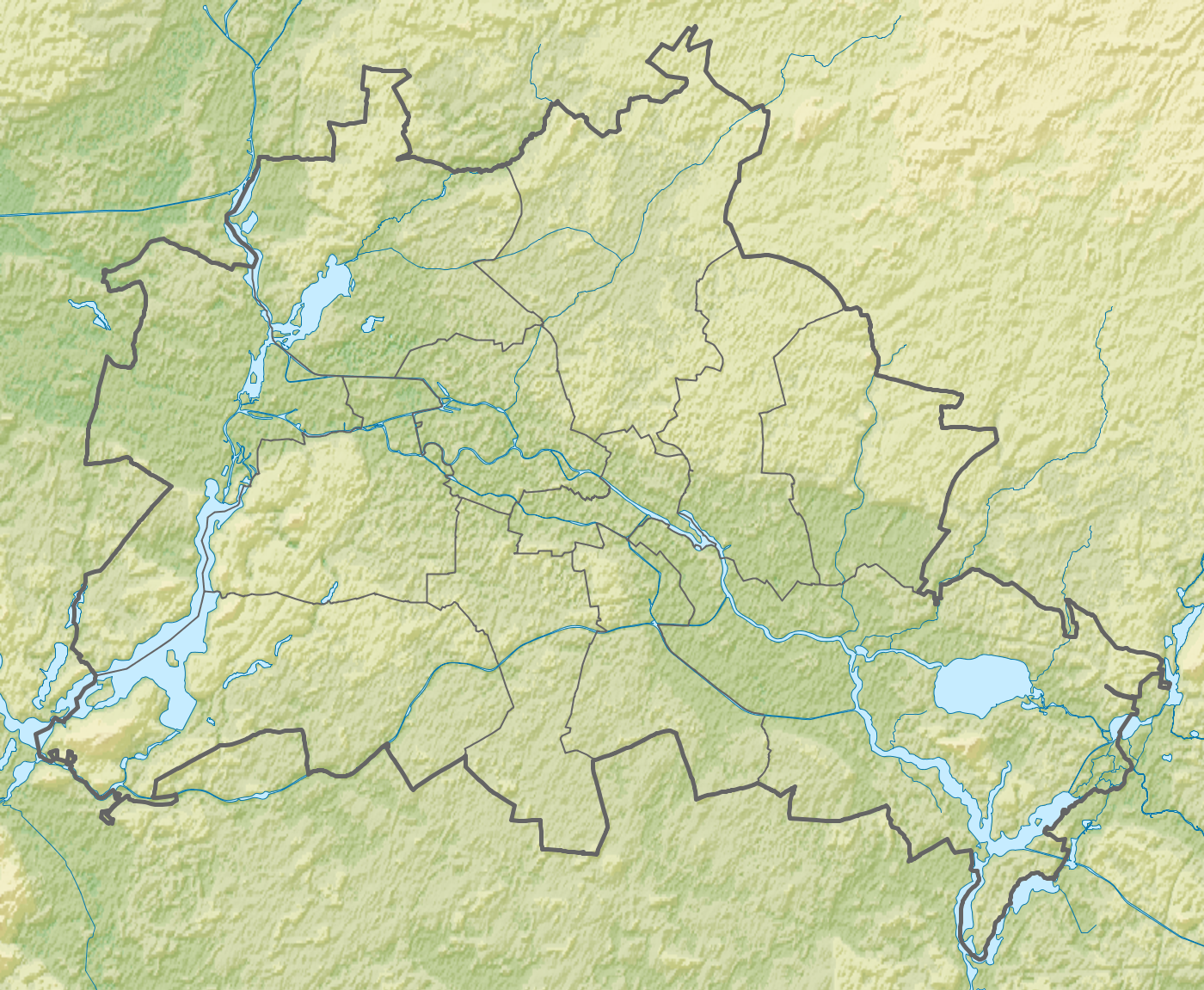
- Location of the former synagogue in Berlin

Religion
- Affiliation: Reform Judaism (former)
- Ecclesiastical or organisational status: Synagogue (1912–1936)
- Status: Destroyed

Location
- Location: Fasanenstrasse, Charlottenburg, Berlin
- Country: Germany
- Coordinates: 52°30′16″N 13°19′41″E

Architecture
- Architect: Ehrenfried Hessel
- Type: Synagogue architecture
- Style: Romanesque Revival; Byzantine Revival
- Completed: 1912
- Destroyed: 1943 (during World War II)

Specifications
- Capacity: 1,720 seats
- Dome: Three

The Fasanenstrasse Synagogue was a former liberal Jewish congregation and synagogue, that was located at 79–80 Fasanenstrasse off Kurfürstendamm, in the affluent neighbourhood of Charlottenburg, in Berlin, Germany. Completed on 26 August 1912, the synagogue was located close to the Berlin Stadtbahn and Zoo Station.

Closed by the Nazis in 1936, the synagogue was partially destroyed on Kristallnacht in 1938, and further devastated in 1943 during World War II, the result of an Allied air raid.

== Construction ==
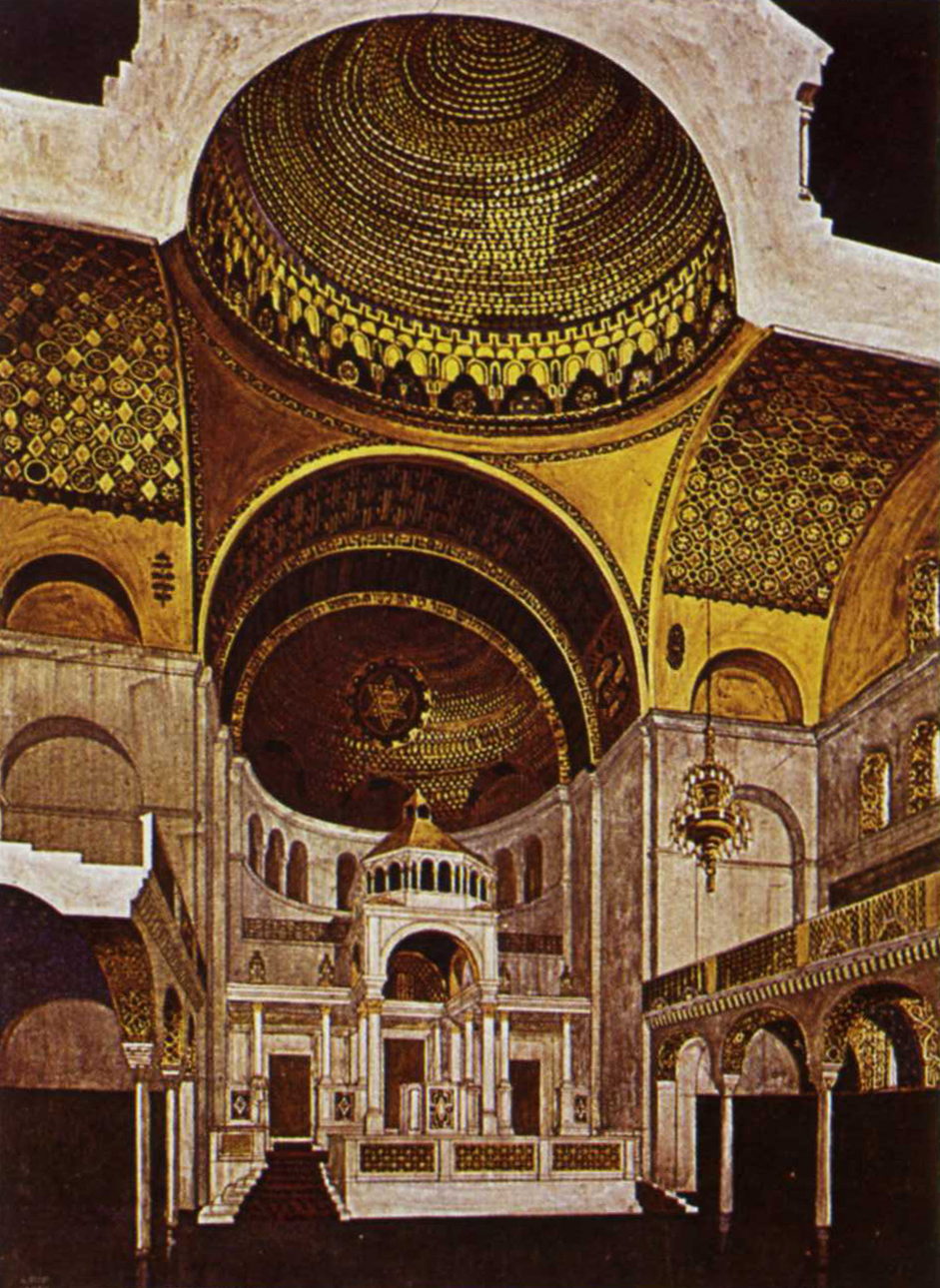
Interior, 1912

The fast-growing Jewish Community in Charlottenburg purchased the premises in 1905 and following an architecture competition the synagogue was built from 1910 in a Romanesque Revival style (similar to the nearby Kaiser Wilhelm Memorial Church) with three domes and distinctive Byzantine Revival elements. Finished in 1912, the monumental structure was large enough to accommodate up to 1,720 worshippers and also included a religious school.

While older synagogues – such as that on Rykestrasse – had usually been erected in backyards, the temple with its richly decorated frontage was intended as a visible statement of Jewish emancipation in the German Empire. Rabbi Leo Baeck was one of its leaders. Its main cantor for many years was Magnus Davidsohn and Richard Altmann (who was blind) was its organist.

Emperor Wilhelm II presented the synagogue with a ceremonial marriage hall richly adorned with Maiolica tiles from his manufacture in Kadinen, dedicated to the Jews of Germany, and, as Magnus Davidsohn's daughter, Ilse Stanley, describes in her book The Unforgotten, visited the temple upon its opening. Kurt Tucholsky on this occasion mocked "the patriotic synagogue" criticizing a voluntary assimilation of German Jews while the ruling class had nothing but contempt for them.

== Closure and Kristallnacht ==
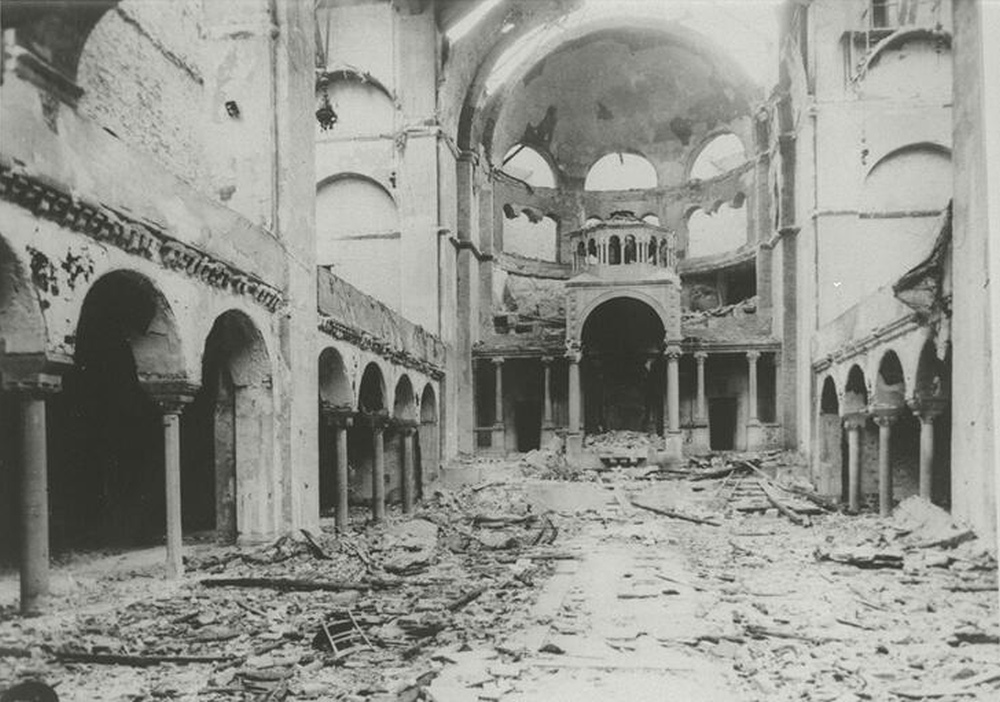
Interior, 1938

By 1931 worshippers were being attacked by paramilitary SA troopers and juveniles incited by anti-semites. The synagogue functioned for only twenty four years until the Nazi authorities finally forced it to close in 1936. The building was destroyed during the Kristallnacht pogrom during the night of 9–10 November 1938. At the Beer Hall Putsch commemoration in Munich, Minister Joseph Goebbels had personally given the orders to smash the synagogue, at that time the largest in Berlin. SA men broke into the building, shattered the interior, piled up religious objects, and finally set the synagogue on fire with fuel they got from a nearby filling station — in the presence of the fire department, which confined itself to preventing the flames from spreading to neighbouring houses.

In 1939 the property was seized in favour of the Deutsche Reichspost. The remains of the building were again devastated during a 1943 Allied air raid.

== Jewish Community Center ==
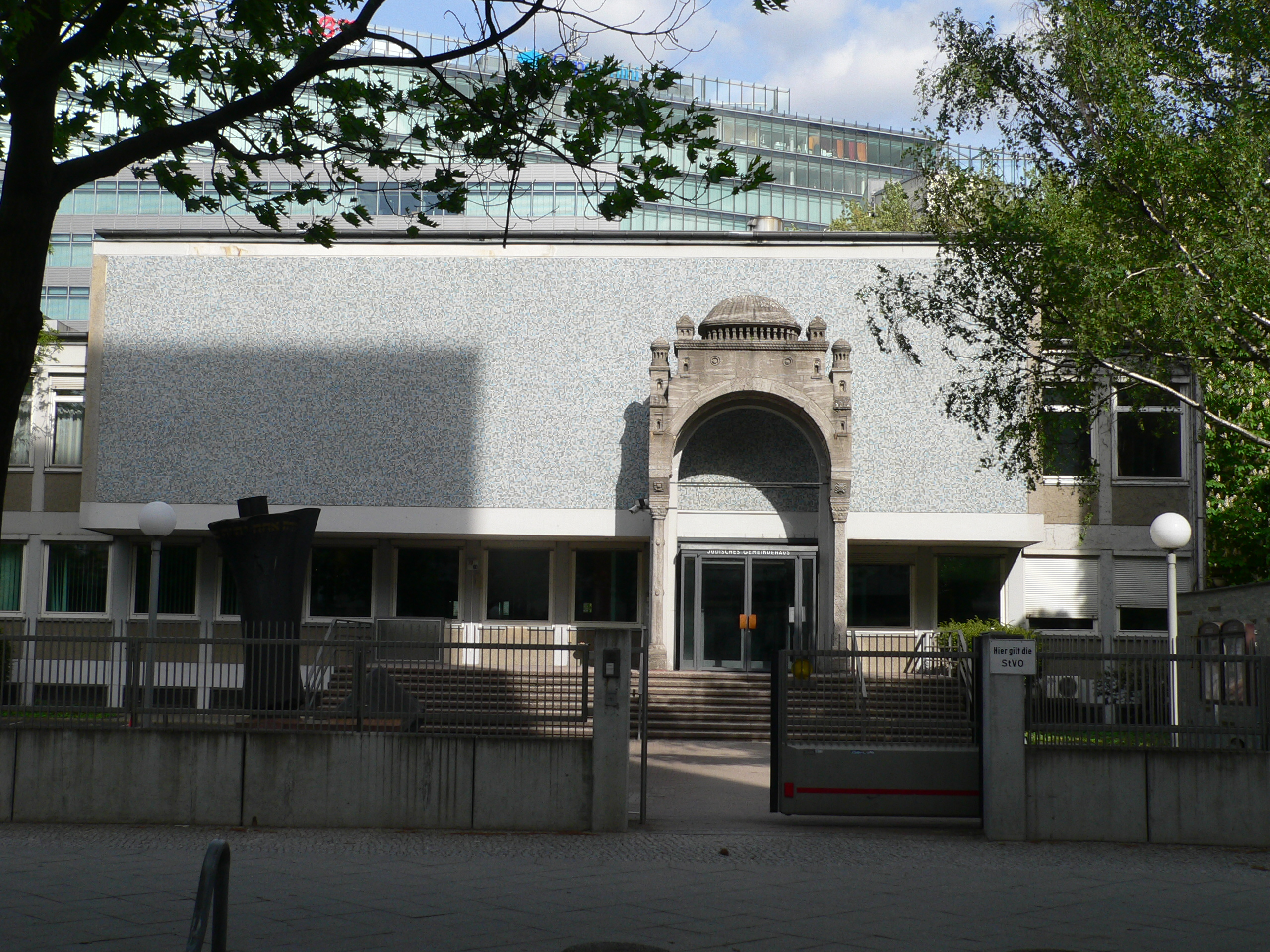
Jüdisches Gemeindehaus, 2010

After the Holocaust, most of the few Jews who returned to Berlin were immigrants from Eastern Europe. Chairman Heinz Galinski promoted the grounds of the former Fasanenstrasse Synagogue to be chosen for the building of a new Jewish Community Centre (Jüdisches Gemeindehaus Fasanenstrasse). On 10 November 1957, the West Berlin mayor Willy Brandt attended the ceremony of laying its cornerstone. The old ruins were removed, but a few surviving elements, such as the main portal, were kept as decoration of the new building designed in the Modern style of the 1950s. The Gemeindehaus was inaugurated on September 27, 1959.

On November 9, 1969, during ceremonies to commemorate the 31st anniversary of Kristallnacht, the German Marxist Tupamaros West-Berlin attempted to attack the Community Center; the bomb, supplied by undercover government agent Peter Urbach, failed to explode. The bombing was planned as a way to turn the focus on the West German relationship with Israel and to fight what they described as an anti-fascist battle against Zionists.

Since 2006 the building hosts the Jewish adult education centre and administrative departments as the Community Center has moved to the New Synagogue on Oranienburger Strasse.

== See also ==
- Beit Hatefutsot, the Museum of the Jewish People
- History of the Jews in Germany
- List of synagogues in Germany (in German)
