= Kristallnaach =

German political song

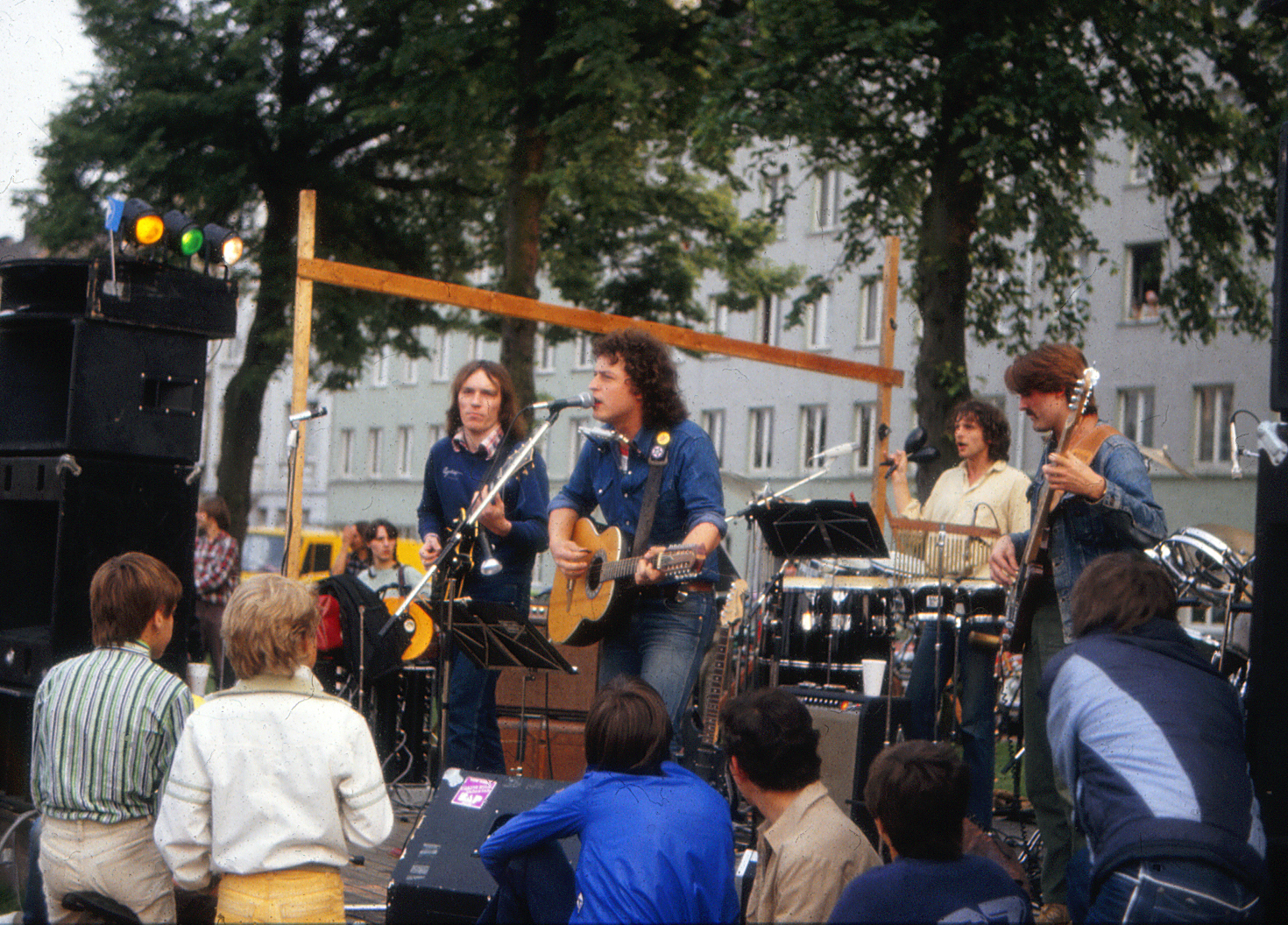
BAP in Aachen in the 1980s

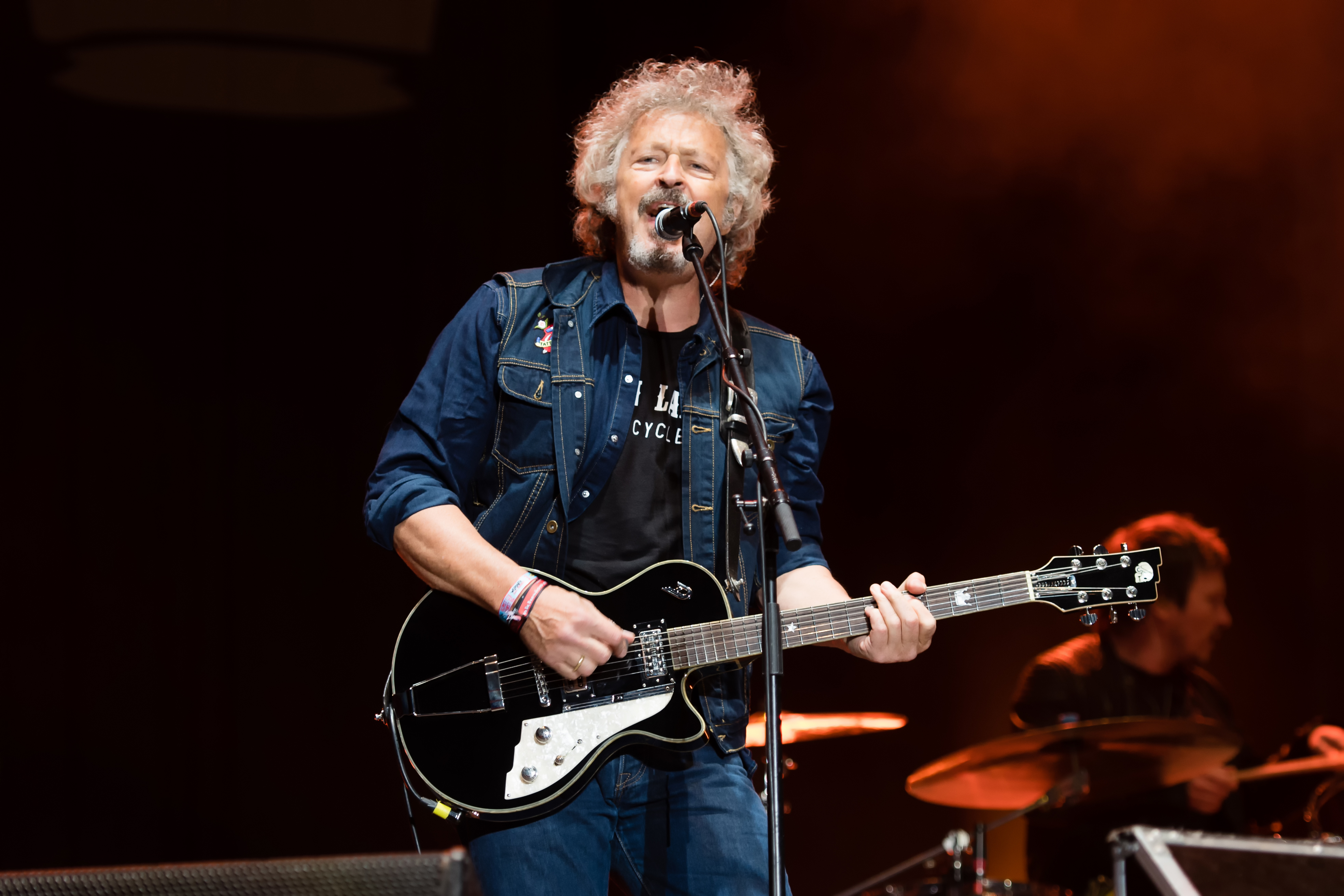
Wolfgang Niedecken in 2018

"Kristallnaach" (Colognian for Kristallnacht, or the Night of Broken Glass) is a political song by Colognian rock group BAP. It was released on their 1982 album Vun drinne noh drusse (From the Inside to the Outside). The track was the album's only single and reached number 25 on the German charts. The song was meant to raise awareness of the resurgence of right-wing populism in Europe and critique Germany's Vergangenheitsbewältigung of the Nazi era. "Kristallnaach" regularly features in the band's live sets and is its second most frequently played live song.

== Development and background ==
In the summer of 1979, during a trip through Greece, only a few years after the country had rid itself of its military dictatorship, BAP's lead singer Wolfgang Niedecken worked on a set of lyrics about neo-fascism, choosing the November Pogrom as its theme. In their early years, BAP drew heavily on the culture of political folk songs in the tradition of Bob Dylan. The motivation for the track was to raise awareness of the resurgence of right-wing populism in Europe and critique (West-) Germany's insufficient Vergangenheitsbewältigung of the Nazi period.

== Lyrics ==
Niedecken's lyrics are as political as they are poetic, with references to Bruegel, Hieronymus Bosch and Franz Kafka. This is also evident in the booklet accompanying the album, with the painting Christ Carrying the Cross, formerly attributed to Bosch, used as background for the song's lyrics. The lyrics feature emotional imagery and are accompanied by somber music. The main theme deals with Germany's Vergangenheitsbewältigung at a time when right-wing conservative tendencies were resurging throughout Europe. Unusual for a single release, the song does not feature a catchy chorus; only the word "Kristallnaach" is repeated in each of the six verses.

Niedecken did not situate his lyrics in the Pogrom Night of 1938, but in the present, in order to raise awareness of the looming threat of crimes being committed against marginalized communities like gay people or immigrants, originating from the same social conditions and psychological processes that led to the November Pogrom.

But those who feel disturbed by anything that's "different"

Swimming with the tide, the way they're supposed to

Those to whom gays are criminals

To whom foreigners are scum

They need someone to seduce them

When that happens, no cavalry's there to save the day

No Zorro's there to care

He's just pissing a "Z" into the snow

Babbling, falling, drunk with coolness

In the 1990s, Niedecken drew on the themes of the third verse once again—incendiary slogans, the public's feigned ignorance of assaults and the propagation of racist and sexist prejudices—when he contributed the eponymous song to the Arsch huh, Zäng ussenander! (Ass up, teeth apart!) initiative, encouraging people to not look away but to stand up, speak out and take action against racism and injustice.

In retrospect, Niedecken voiced concern over coupling the lyrics of "Kristallnaach" with catchy music. "Everybody sings along and nobody reflects on what the song is actually about. But I can't begrudge anyone for doing so, because people come to see a concert, not to think about the pogroms with me." In his book Catastrophic State Germany: National Socialism in Popular Songs of the Bundesrepublik, German cultural historian Ole Löding points out that the song's lyrics, aside from highlighting political activities in the right-wing spectrum, include a strong critique of the capitalist system, particularly in the two final verses, which suggest that the danger of the society's renewed fascistization arises from a submissive-aggressive personality structure of the German people. According to Löding, the song equates the November Pogroms with a number of contemporary social issues, thus turning the November Pogroms into a metaphor of all kinds of inhuman behavior. In doing so, Löding argues, the song contributes to a historicization of national socialism and fails to fully reflect the root causes of the pogroms.

== Other versions ==
In 2016, Samy Deluxe performed a rap version of Kristallnacht on the German TV show Sing meinen Song – Das Tauschkonzert. In 2017, Niedecken recorded a new version of the song in Standard German. With this recording, he supported not-for-profit initiative Projekt Demotapes, through which musicians and filmmakers show their support for democracy.
