= How Fascism Works =

2018 nonfiction book by Jason Stanley

How Fascism Works: The Politics of Us and Them
- First edition
- Author: Jason Stanley
- Language: English
- Genre: Non-fiction
- Publisher: Random House
- Publication date: September 4, 2018
- Publication place: New York
- Pages: 240
- ISBN: 978-0-525-51183-0
- OCLC: 1066694818
- Preceded by: How Propaganda Works (2017)

How Fascism Works: The Politics of Us and Them is a 2018 nonfiction book by Jason Stanley, the former Jacob Urowsky Professor of Philosophy at Yale University. Since 2025 he has been the Bissell-Heyd Chair in American Studies at the University of Toronto’s Munk School of Global Affairs & Public Policy, with a cross-appointment in philosophy. His move to Canada has been widely reported as motivated by growing concerns over political interference in U.S. universities, restrictions on academic freedom, and his desire to raise his children in a more stable democratic environment. Stanley, whose parents were refugees of Nazi Germany, describes strategies employed by fascist regimes, which includes normalizing the "intolerable". Features of this are already evident, according to Stanley, in the politics of the United States, the Philippines, Brazil, Russia, and Hungary. The book was reissued in 2020 with a new preface in which Stanley describes how global events have substantiated his concern that fascist rhetoric is showing up in politics and policies around the world.

How Fascism Works received renewed attention in March 2025 when author Jason Stanley expressed his opinion that the US is transitioning into becoming a fascist dictatorship and that he was leaving the country to move to Canada.

== Summary ==
"What normalization does is transform the morally extraordinary into the ordinary. It makes us able to tolerate what was once intolerable by making it seem as if this is the way things have always been."

— Stanley. How Fascism Works

Stanley focuses on rhetoric and propaganda. His previous books include Knowledge and Practical Interests, Language in Context, Know How and the award-winning How Propaganda Works. He is a witness to the "consequences of fascism", his parents having fled Germany during the Holocaust. His maternal aunts, uncles and cousins were killed in eastern Poland in 1941 during Hitler's invasion. Stanley identifies the pillars of fascist politics that deepen the divide between "us" and "them" - denying equality, using a culture of victimhood, and feeding the sexual anxiety of men. Strategies include undermining journalists and reporters, promoting anti-intellectualism, the use of propaganda, spreading conspiracy theories, letting fear and anger overtake "reasoned debate", and then calling on "law and order" solutions. Stanley describes how one of the hallmarks of fascism is the "politics of hierarchy" - a belief in a biologically determined superiority - whereby fascists strive to recreate a "mythic" and "glorious" past by excluding those they believe to be inferior because of their ethnicity, religion, and/or race.

== Content: the ten pillars of fascism ==
1. The mythic past: Fascists draw on a mythical past to justify a glorious future.
2. Propaganda: Propaganda in fascist politics often operates through inflammatory speech, stirring hostility and manipulating emotions, and displacing reasoned public debate with fear and division.
3. Anti-intellectual: Fascist politics attacks education, expertise, and language, weakening the tools necessary for informed public debate and leaving power and group identity as the only basis for judgment.
4. Unreality: By flooding the public space with falsehoods and attacking trusted institutions, fascist politics destabilizes reality and shifts truth from a shared understanding of reality to the authority of a leader.
5. Hierarchy: Unlike liberal thought, which expands dignity and rights to all, fascist ideology sees hierarchy as rooted in nature, using myths to legitimize dominance by the powerful. Equality is portrayed as a denial of this natural order.
6. Victimhood: Fascist politics blurs the line between equality and discrimination, portraying the dominant group as victims of a hidden conspiracy.
7. Law and order: A healthy democracy ensures equal justice and mutual respect among citizens and authorities. Fascist law-and-order rhetoric, by contrast, divides society into the naturally lawful and the inherently criminal, portraying those who defy traditional norms, such as women outside gender roles, nonwhites, immigrants, or religious minorities, as threats to order simply by existing.
8. Sexual anxiety: Fascist politics ties national strength to patriarchal manhood and the traditional family, treating any deviation as a threat. It exploits sexual anxiety and economic insecurity, fueling panic over race mixing, gender nonconformity, and nontraditional sexuality to reinforce ideals of purity and order.
9. Sodom and Gomorrah: Fascist politics idealizes rural life as morally pure and central to national strength, while depicting cities as corrupt and influenced by outsiders. Policies are framed to protect rural communities from urban and foreign "contamination".
10. "Arbeit Macht Frei" (Work sets you free): In fascist ideology, aid in times of crisis is reserved for the so-called chosen nation: "us," not "them". Those excluded are portrayed as lazy and undeserving of state aid, with hard labor seen as a means of reform, an idea symbolized by the Nazi slogan "Arbeit macht frei" at the gates of Auschwitz.

== Reviews ==
According to a New York Times review, Stanley's book - a "slim volume" - "breezes across decades and continents" and argues that Donald Trump "resembles other purveyors of authoritarian ultranationalism".

The New Yorker said that How Fascism Works was popular, even though it was by an "academic philosopher" - it "prioritized current events over syllogisms" and "ranged broadly, citing experimental psychology, legal theory, and neo-Nazi blogs".

The Guardian's cited Stanley who said that, one of the "ironies of fascist politics" is that it includes the "normalization of the fascist myth" so that talk of fascism is made to appear to be "outlandish". Fascist politics makes us able to "tolerate what was once intolerable by making it seem as if this is the way things have always been. ... By contrast the word 'fascist' has acquired a feeling of the extreme, like 'crying wolf'".

The Times Literary Supplement (TLS) said that How Fascism Works belongs to a "wave of articles, books and op-eds" that warn us of the "return of fascism" - which includes Fascism: A Warning by Madeleine Albright, On Tyranny by Timothy Snyder, When The Mob Gets Swayed with contributions by Paul Neuborn, and The Dangerous Case of Donald Trump with contributions by John Gartner. Stanley said in his book that a number of countries - the Philippines, Rwanda, Myanmar, Brazil, Russia, Hungary, Poland and the United States - have currently been "affected by fascist politics".

== See also ==
- How Propaganda Works - another book by Stanley
- The Anatomy of Fascism - another book analysing fascism
