= The Anatomy of Fascism =

2004 book by Robert O. Paxton

- Author: Robert O. Paxton
- Language: English
- Genre: Non-fiction
- Publisher: Alfred A. Knopf
- Publication date: 2004

The Anatomy of Fascism is a 2004 book by Robert O. Paxton, published by Alfred A. Knopf.

Paxton sought to establish a more concise definition of fascism in an era where people used the term loosely. The author argued that fascism only took root in countries which had more dysfunctional societies and in which conservative elites chose to allow them to form coalitions with them. Paxton examines Fascist Italy and Nazi Germany in detail, which he argues both had the coalition commonality but the Nazi Party became more important in Germany while the party did not overshadow the state apparatus in Italy.

Paxton argues that Islamists do not fit the definition of a fascist movement.

The work has an essay meant to document bibliographical information. Philip Gordon and Stanley Hoffman in Foreign Affairs wrote that this essay "will guide scholars and graduate students for years to come."

== Reception ==
Samantha Power in The New York Times stated that the book "may well become the most authoritative" work on the subject due to it being "convincing", "fair", and "thorough".

Publishers Weekly gave the book a starred review, stating that "This is sure to take its place among classics in the field".

Peter Bergen, in a CNN article, described the book as a "classic" in its field.

== See also ==
- How Fascism Works
