= How Propaganda Works =

2015 nonfiction book by Jason Stanley

- Author: Jason Stanley
- Language: English
- Publisher: Princeton University Press
- Publication date: 2015

How Propaganda Works is a 2015 nonfiction book by Jason Stanley, published by Princeton University Press.

Reviewer Martin van Tunen described the book as "a primarily philosophical investigation of the phenomenon of propaganda".

According to the author, propaganda reduces empathy in people, which makes citizens okay with negative actions happening to others, and/or conceals why certain practices are done, and therefore makes it hard for citizens to think properly about the policies and how they work. Therefore, the author argues, propaganda reduces discourse of what should be reasonable.

The author argues that economic equality is necessary for the process of discussion in the democratic process to truly function. He also added that the beliefs in unequal societies like the pre-American Civil War Southern United States were, in his own words "flawed", meaning that people who hold these beliefs cannot easily change them. Stanley argued that white Southerners wrongly believed their society was meritocratic by seeing slaves in poor conditions, when in fact the society created those conditions. The author argues that such ideologies are what characterizes propaganda. Raphael van Riel of Philipps-University Marburg and the University of Duisburg-Essen wrote that the work shows that propaganda can be used against democracy and is often done to hide the anti-democratic rationale behind it.

The author argues that a society with free speech and an unequal socioeconomic environment lacks stability.

The work includes ideas and argumentation from various experts of multiple fields, including epistemology, ethics, philosophy, psychology, political theory, and sociology. Renee Jorgensen Bolinger of the University of Southern California wrote that the wide variety of topics means that a non-academic reader may have difficulty digesting the book, even though the authors intended for the main audience to be a general one.

== Content ==
Tunen stated that the first chapter discusses " this shallow academic state of" the academic study of propaganda.

The sixth chapter argues that poor people often adopt the beliefs of the wealthy and powerful, even if said beliefs are harmful to poor people like themselves. The flawed beliefs are used to prevent the poor from challenging their own condition.

== Reception ==
According to Bollinger, the breadth of concepts covered is "one of its greatest virtues".

Eric Swanson of the University of Michigan stated that it can be engaged with in many different ways, and described it as "brilliant, rich, and wide-ranging".

== See also ==
- How Fascism Works, another book by Stanley
