= Magnus Davidsohn =

German opera singer

Magnus Davidsohn (2 November 1877 – 21 August 1958) was chief cantor of the Fasanenstrasse synagogue from its opening in 1912 until its closing by the Nazis in 1936. A trained opera singer, he played the part of King Heinrich in Gustav Mahler's 1899 production of Lohengrin. After leaving Berlin in 1939, he helped found Belsize Square Synagogue in London. He died in Düsseldorf, West Germany, in 1958.

Davidsohn and his wife were friends with the parents of Ernst vom Rath, whose assassination in Paris precipitated Kristallnacht. Directly after vom Rath's murder, Davidsohn and his wife visited the parents of vom Rath, who assured him that they did not blame the Jews of Germany.

Magnus Davidsohn was the brother of the Wagner opera singer Max Dawison, whom he joined at the Prague Opera at the start of his singing career. His great-uncle was the actor Bogumil Dawison. Magnus Davidsohn's daughter, Ilse Stanley, saved hundreds of Jews from concentration camps, and was the author of the book The Unforgotten (Beacon Press, 1957), a memoir of Weimar Germany and the Nazi years. She was also featured on an episode of the American television program This Is Your Life, where she was reunited with her father. A biography of Davidsohn, authored by Esther Slevogt, was published in 2013.
