= Kristallnacht =

1938 anti-Jewish pogroms in Nazi Germany

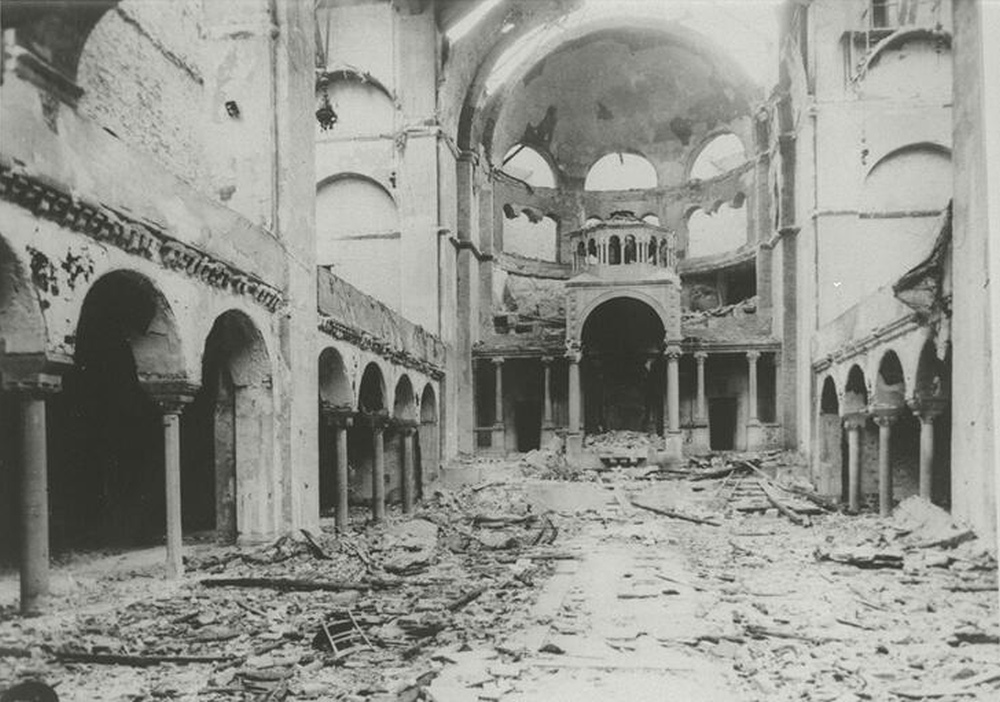
- Partially destroyed Fasanenstrasse Synagogue in Berlin
- Location: Nazi Germany (then including Austria and the Sudetenland)
- Date: 9–10 November 1938
- Target: Jews
- Attack type: Pogrom, purge, looting, arson, mass arrests, homicide, kidnapping
- Deaths: 91+ (early reports); 1,000–2,000 (later estimates)
- Perpetrators: Adolf Hitler and the Nazi Party, Sturmabteilung (SA) stormtroopers, Schutzstaffel (SS), Hitler Youth, German civilians
- Motive: Revenge for Ernst vom Rath's assassination, antisemitism

Kristallnacht (German: [kʁɪsˈtalnaχt]; lit. 'crystal night') or the Night of Broken Glass, also called the November pogrom(s) (German: Novemberpogrome [noˈvɛm.bɐ.poˌɡʁoːmə]), was a pogrom against Jews carried out by the Nazi Party's Sturmabteilung (SA) and Schutzstaffel (SS) paramilitary forces along with some participation from the Hitler Youth and German civilians throughout Nazi Germany on 9–10 November 1938. The German authorities looked on without intervening. The euphemistic name Kristallnacht comes from the shards of broken glass that littered the streets after the windows of Jewish-owned stores, buildings, and synagogues were smashed. The pretext for the attacks was the assassination, on 9 November 1938, of the German diplomat Ernst vom Rath by Herschel Grynszpan, a 17-year-old German-born Polish Jew living in Paris.

Jewish homes, hospitals and schools were ransacked as attackers demolished buildings with sledgehammers. Rioters destroyed over 1,400 synagogues and prayer rooms throughout Germany, Austria, and the Sudetenland. Over 7,000 Jewish businesses were damaged or destroyed, and 30,000 Jewish men were arrested and incarcerated in concentration camps. British historian Martin Gilbert wrote that no event in the history of German Jews between 1933 and 1945 was so widely reported as it was happening, and the accounts from foreign journalists working in Germany drew worldwide attention. The Times of London observed on 11 November 1938: "No foreign propagandist bent upon blackening Germany before the world could outdo the tale of burnings and beatings, of blackguardly assaults on defenceless and innocent people, which disgraced that country yesterday."

Estimates of fatalities caused by the attacks have varied. Early reports estimated that 91 Jews had been murdered. (Note: "Windows of shops owned by Jews which were broken during a coordinated anti-Jewish demonstration in Berlin, known as Kristallnacht, on 10 November 1938. Nazi authorities turned a blind eye as SA stormtroopers and civilians destroyed storefronts with hammers, leaving the streets covered in pieces of smashed windows. Ninety-one Jews were killed, and 30,000 Jewish men were taken to concentration camps.") Modern analysis of German scholarly sources puts the figure much higher; when deaths from post-arrest maltreatment and subsequent suicides are included, the death toll reaches the hundreds, with Richard J. Evans estimating 638 deaths by suicide, with a total between one and two thousand. Historians view Kristallnacht as a prelude to the Final Solution and the murder of six million Jews during the Holocaust.

== Background ==
=== Early Nazi persecutions ===
In the 1920s, most German Jews were fully integrated into the country's society as citizens. They served in the army and navy and contributed to every field of German business, science and culture. Conditions for German Jews began to worsen after the appointment of Adolf Hitler (the Austrian-born leader of the National Socialist German Workers' Party [abbreviated NSDAP in German]) as Chancellor of Germany on 30 January 1933, and the Enabling Act (implemented 23 March 1933) which enabled the assumption of power by Hitler after the Reichstag fire of 27 February 1933. From its inception, Hitler's regime moved quickly to introduce anti-Jewish policies. Nazi propaganda alienated the 500,000 Jews living in Germany, who accounted for only 0.86% of the overall population, and framed them as an enemy responsible for Germany's defeat in the First World War and for its subsequent economic disasters, such as the 1920s hyperinflation and the subsequent Great Depression. Beginning in 1933, the German government enacted a series of anti-Jewish laws restricting the rights of German Jews to earn a living, to enjoy full citizenship and to gain an education, including the Law for the Restoration of the Professional Civil Service of 7 April 1933, which forbade Jews to work in the civil service. The subsequent 1935 Nuremberg Laws stripped German Jews of their citizenship and prohibited Jews from marrying non-Jewish Germans.

These laws resulted in the exclusion and alienation of Jews from German social and political life. Many sought asylum abroad; hundreds of thousands emigrated, but as Chaim Weizmann wrote in 1936, "The world seemed to be divided into two parts—those places where the Jews could not live and those where they could not enter." The international Évian Conference on 6 July 1938 addressed the issue of Jewish and Romani immigration to other countries. By the time the conference took place, more than 250,000 Jews had fled Germany and Austria, which had been annexed by Germany in March 1938; more than 300,000 German and Austrian Jews continued to seek refuge and asylum from oppression. As the number of Jews and Romani wanting to leave increased, the restrictions against them grew, with many countries tightening their rules for admission. By 1938, Germany "had entered a new radical phase in anti-Semitic activity". Some historians believe that the Nazi government had been contemplating a planned outbreak of violence against the Jews and were waiting for an appropriate provocation; there is evidence of this planning dating back to 1937. In a 1997 interview, the German historian Hans Mommsen said that a major motive for the pogrom was the desire of the Gauleiters of the NSDAP to seize Jewish property and businesses. Mommsen stated:

The need for money by the party organization stemmed from the fact that Franz Xaver Schwarz, the party treasurer, kept the local and regional organizations of the party short of money. In the autumn of 1938, the increased pressure on Jewish property nourished the party's ambition, especially since Hjalmar Schacht had been ousted as Reich minister for economics. This, however, was only one aspect of the origin of the November 1938 pogrom, where the interests between the different agencies of party and state converged. While the Nazi party was interested in improving its financial strength on the regional and local level by taking over Jewish property, Hermann Göring, in charge of the Four-Year Plan, hoped to acquire access to foreign currency in order to pay for the import of urgently-needed raw material. Heydrich and Himmler were interested in enforcing the emigration of German Jews.

=== Expulsion of Polish Jews in Germany ===
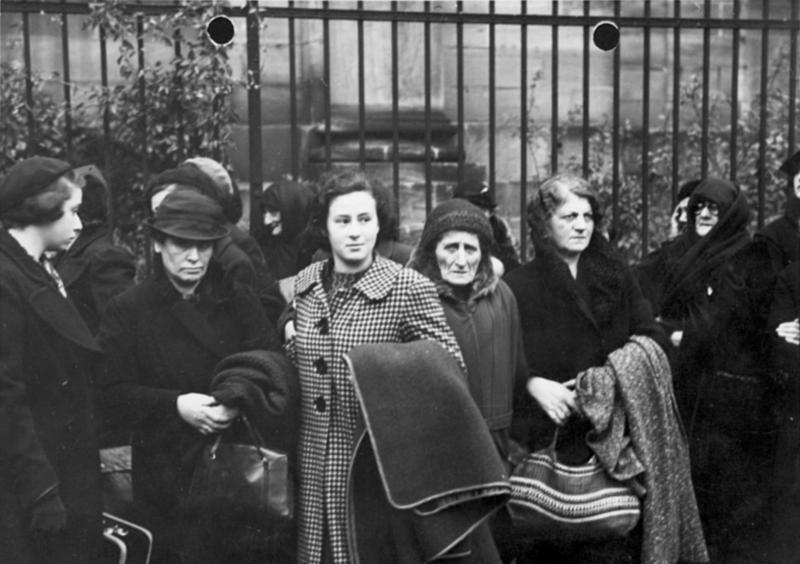
Polish Jews expelled from Germany in late October 1938

In August 1938, German authorities announced that residence permits for foreigners were being canceled and would have to be renewed. This included German-born Jews of foreign citizenship. Poland stated that it would renounce citizenship rights of Polish Jews living abroad for at least five years after the end of October, effectively making them stateless. In the so-called "Polenaktion", more than 12,000 Polish Jews, among them the philosopher and theologian Rabbi Abraham Joshua Heschel and future literary critic Marcel Reich-Ranicki, were expelled from Germany on 28 October 1938, on Hitler's orders. They were ordered to leave their homes in a single night and were allowed only one suitcase per person to carry their belongings. As the Jews were taken away, their remaining possessions were seized as loot both by Nazi authorities and by neighbors.

The deportees were taken from their homes to railway stations and were put on trains to the Polish border, where Polish border guards sent them back into Germany. This stalemate continued for days in the pouring rain, with the Jews marching without food or shelter between the borders. Four thousand were granted entry into Poland, but the remaining 8,000 were forced to stay at the border. They waited there in harsh conditions to be allowed to enter Poland. A British newspaper told its readers that hundreds "are reported to be lying about, penniless and deserted, in little villages along the frontier near where they had been driven out by the Gestapo and left." Conditions in the refugee camps "were so bad that some actually tried to escape back into Germany and were shot", recalled a British woman who was sent to help those who had been expelled.

=== Shooting of vom Rath ===
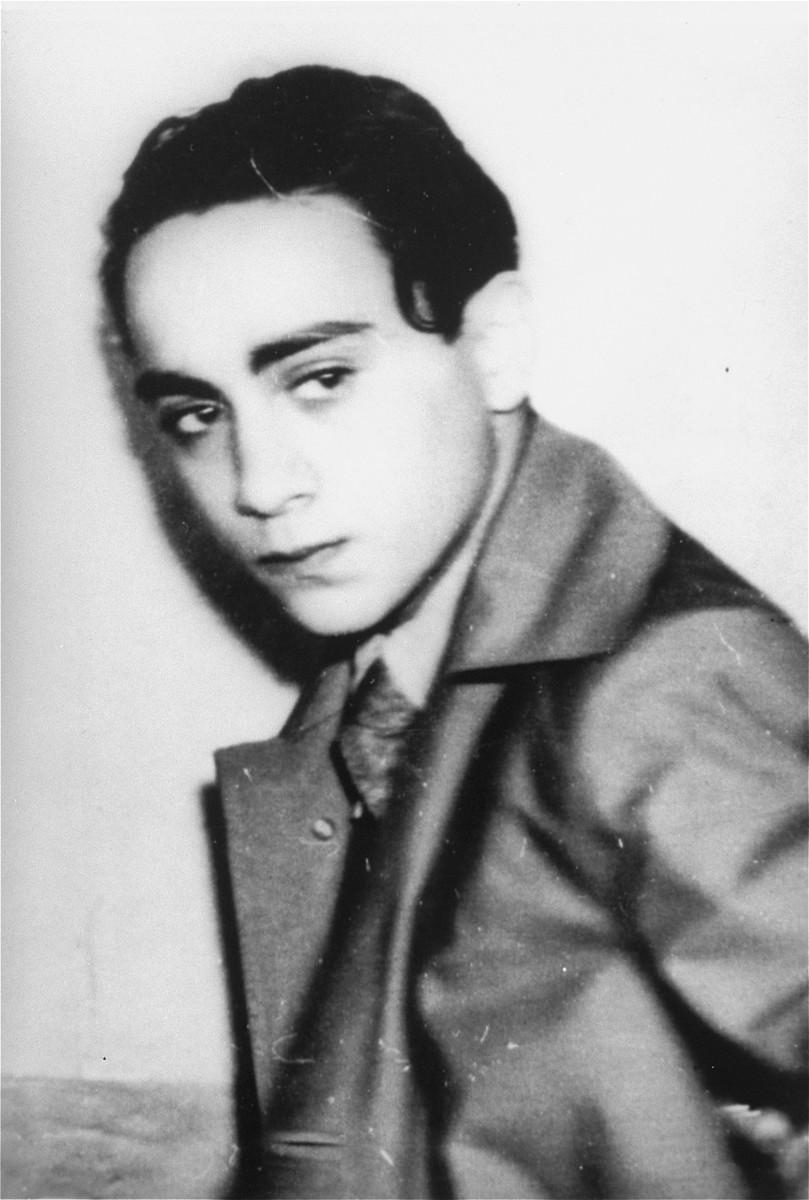
Herschel Grynszpan, 7 November 1938

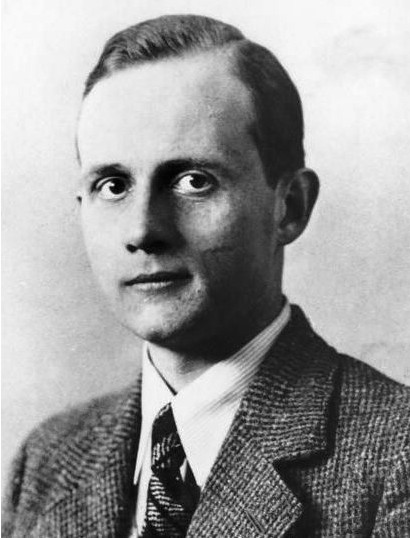
Ernst vom Rath

Among those expelled was the family of Sendel and Riva Grynszpan, Polish Jews who had emigrated to Germany in 1911 and settled in Hanover, Germany. At the trial of Adolf Eichmann in 1961, Sendel Grynszpan recounted the events of their deportation from Hanover on the night of 27 October 1938: "Then they took us in police trucks, in prisoners' lorries, about 20 men in each truck, and they took us to the railway station. The streets were full of people shouting: 'Juden Raus! Auf Nach Palästina!'" ("Jews get out! Go to Palestine!"). Their seventeen-year-old son Herschel was living in Paris with an uncle. Herschel received a postcard from his family from the Polish border, describing the family's expulsion: "No one told us what was up, but we realized this was going to be the end .... We don't have a penny. Could you send us something?" He received the postcard on 3 November 1938.

On the morning of Monday, 7 November 1938, he purchased a revolver and a box of bullets, then went to the German embassy and asked to see an embassy official. After he was taken to the office of German diplomat Ernst vom Rath, Grynszpan fired five bullets at vom Rath, two of which hit him in the abdomen. Vom Rath was a professional diplomat with the Foreign Office who expressed anti-Nazi sympathies, largely based on the Nazis' treatment of the Jews and was under Gestapo investigation for being politically unreliable. However, he also argued that the anti-Semitic laws were "necessary" to allow the Volksgemeinschaft to flourish.

Grynszpan made no attempt to escape the French police and freely confessed to the shooting. He stated that his motives were to avenge the Jewish people for the actions taken by the Germans against Jews. In his pocket, he carried a postcard to his parents with the message, "With God's help. My dear parents, I could not do otherwise, may God forgive me, the heart bleeds when I hear of your tragedy and that of the 12,000 Jews. I must protest so that the whole world hears my protest, and that I will do. Forgive me."

The next day, the German government retaliated, barring Jewish children from German state elementary schools, indefinitely suspending Jewish cultural activities, and putting a halt to the publication of Jewish newspapers and magazines, including the three national German Jewish newspapers. A newspaper in Britain described the last move, which cut off the Jewish populace from their leaders, as "intended to disrupt the Jewish community and rob it of the last frail ties which hold it together." Their rights as citizens had been stripped. One of the first legal measures issued was an order by Heinrich Himmler, commander of all German police, forbidding Jews to possess any weapons whatsoever and imposing a penalty of twenty years' confinement in a concentration camp upon every Jew found in possession of a weapon hereafter.

== Pogrom ==
=== Death of Ernst vom Rath ===
Ernst vom Rath died of his wounds on 9 November 1938. Word of his death reached Hitler that evening while he was with several key members of the Nazi party at a dinner commemorating the 1923 Beer Hall Putsch. After intense discussions, Hitler left the assembly abruptly without giving his usual address. Propaganda Minister Joseph Goebbels delivered the speech in his place, and said that "the Führer has decided that... demonstrations should not be prepared or organized by the party, but insofar as they erupt spontaneously, they are not to be hampered." The chief party judge Walter Buch later stated that the message was clear; with these words, Goebbels had commanded the party leaders to organize a pogrom.

Some leading party officials disagreed with Goebbels' actions, fearing the diplomatic crisis it would provoke. Heinrich Himmler wrote, "I suppose that it is Goebbels's megalomania ... and stupidity which is responsible for starting this operation now, in a particularly difficult diplomatic situation." The Israeli historian Saul Friedländer believes that Goebbels had personal reasons for wanting to bring about Kristallnacht. Goebbels had recently suffered humiliation for the ineffectiveness of his propaganda campaign during the Sudeten crisis, and was in some disgrace over an affair with a Czech actress, Lída Baarová. Goebbels needed a chance to improve his standing in the eyes of Hitler. At 1:20 a.m. on 10 November 1938, Reinhard Heydrich sent an urgent secret telegram to the Sicherheitspolizei (Security Police; SiPo) and the Sturmabteilung (SA), containing instructions regarding the riots. This included guidelines for the protection of foreigners and non-Jewish businesses and property. Police were instructed not to interfere with the riots unless the guidelines were violated. Police were also instructed to seize Jewish archives from synagogues and community offices, and to arrest and detain "healthy male Jews, who are not too old", for eventual transfer to (labor) concentration camps. Heinrich Müller, in a message to SA and SS commanders, stated the "most extreme measures" were to be taken against Jewish people.

=== Riots and Kristallnacht ===
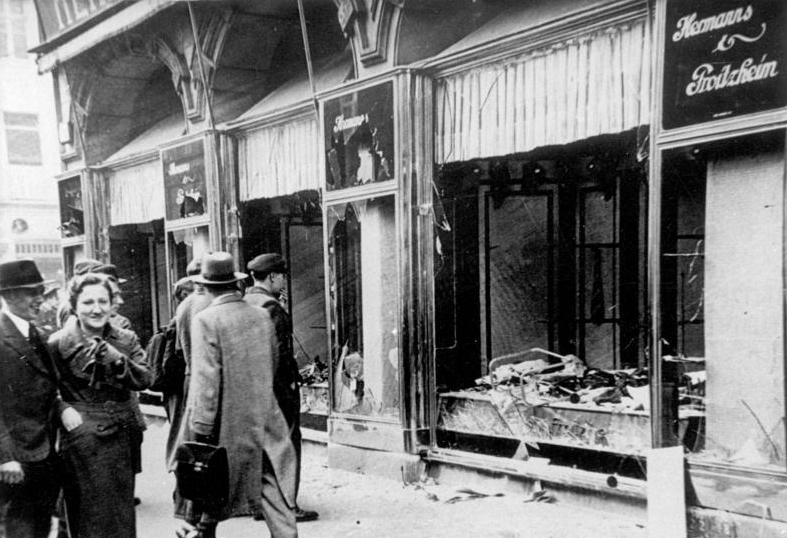
Kristallnacht, shop damage in Magdeburg

Beginning on 9 November, the SA and Hitler Youth shattered the windows of about 7,500 Jewish stores and businesses, hence the name Kristallnacht (Crystal Night), and looted their goods. Jewish homes were ransacked all throughout Germany. Although violence against Jews had not been explicitly condoned by the authorities, there were cases of Jews being beaten or assaulted. Following the violence, police departments recorded a large number of suicides and rapes.

The rioters destroyed many hundreds of synagogues throughout Germany, Austria, and the Sudetenland, with estimates of over 1,668 synagogues and prayer rooms ransacked, and 95 destroyed. Many Jewish cemeteries, more than 7,000 Jewish shops, and 29 department stores were damaged, and in many cases destroyed. 91 Jews were murdered and more than 30,000 Jewish men were arrested and imprisoned in Nazi concentration camps, primarily Dachau, Buchenwald, and Sachsenhausen.

The synagogues, some centuries old, were also victims of considerable violence and vandalism, with the tactics the Stormtroopers practiced on these and other sacred sites described as "approaching the ghoulish" by the United States Consul in Leipzig. Tombstones were uprooted and graves violated. Fires were lit, and prayer books, scrolls, artwork and philosophy texts were thrown upon them, and precious buildings were either burned or smashed until unrecognizable. Eric Lucas recalls the destruction of the synagogue that a tiny Jewish community had constructed in a small village only twelve years earlier:

It did not take long before the first heavy grey stones came tumbling down, and the children of the village amused themselves as they flung stones into the many colored windows. When the first rays of a cold and pale November sun penetrated the heavy dark clouds, the little synagogue was but a heap of stone, broken glass and smashed-up woodwork.

The Daily Telegraph correspondent, Hugh Greene, wrote of events in Berlin:

Mob law ruled in Berlin throughout the afternoon and evening and hordes of hooligans indulged in an orgy of destruction. I have seen several anti-Jewish outbreaks in Germany during the last five years, but never anything as nauseating as this. Racial hatred and hysteria seemed to have taken complete hold of otherwise decent people. I saw fashionably dressed women clapping their hands and screaming with glee, while respectable middle-class mothers held up their babies to see the 'fun'.

Many Berliners were, however, deeply ashamed of the pogrom, and some took great personal risks to offer help to their beleaguered Jewish neighbors. The son of a US consular official heard the janitor of his block cry: "They must have emptied the insane asylums and penitentiaries to find people who'd do things like that!"

KOLD briefly reported on a 2008 remembrance meeting at a local Jewish congregation. According to eyewitness Esther Harris: "They ripped up the belongings, the books, knocked over furniture, shouted obscenities". Historian Gerhard Weinberg is quoted as saying:

Houses of worship burned down, vandalized, in every community in the country where people either participate or watch.

== Aftermath ==
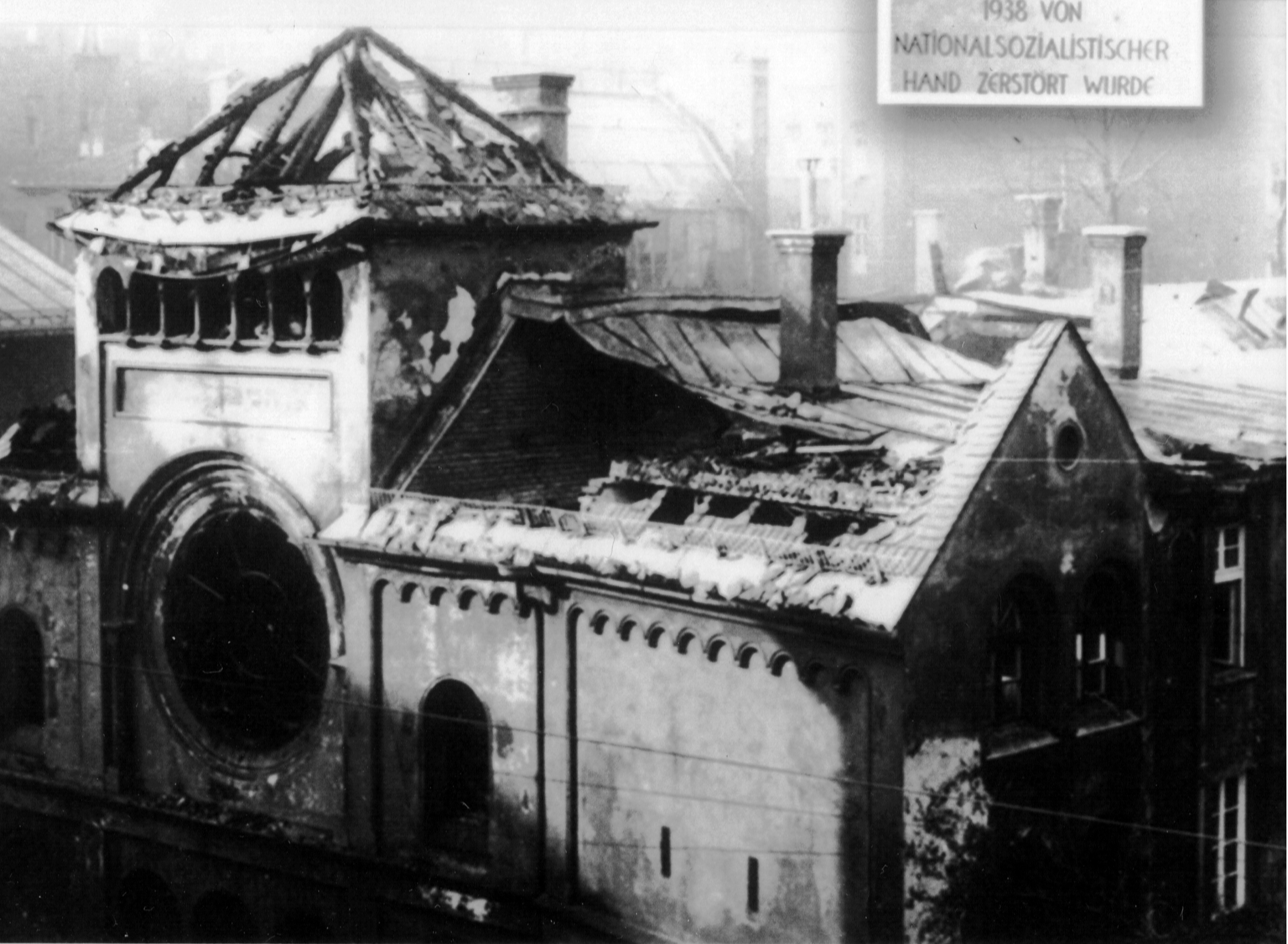
A ruined synagogue in Munich after Kristallnacht

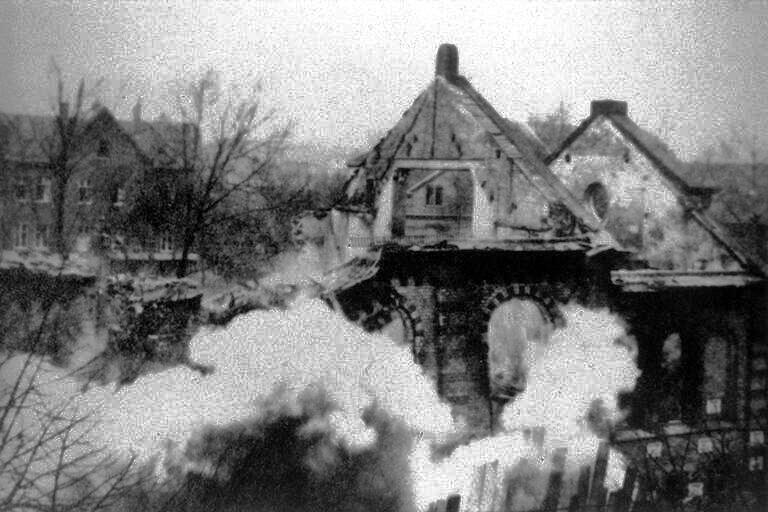
A ruined synagogue in Eisenach after Kristallnacht

Former German Emperor Wilhelm II commented "For the first time, I am ashamed to be German."

Göring, who was in favor of expropriating the property of the Jews rather than destroying it, as had happened in the pogrom, directly complained to Sicherheitspolizei Chief Heydrich immediately after the events: "I'd rather you had beaten to death two-hundred Jews than destroy so many valuable assets!" ("Mir wäre lieber gewesen, ihr hättet 200 Juden erschlagen und hättet nicht solche Werte vernichtet!"). Göring met with other members of the Nazi leadership on 12 November to plan the next steps after the riots, setting the stage for formal government action. In the transcript of the meeting, Göring said,

I have received a letter written on the Führer's orders requesting that the Jewish question be now, once and for all, coordinated and solved one way or another .... I should not want to leave any doubt, gentlemen, as to the aim of today's meeting. We have not come together merely to talk again, but to make decisions, and I implore competent agencies to take all measures for the elimination of the Jew from the German economy, and to submit them to me.

The persecution and economic damage inflicted upon German Jews continued after the pogrom, even as their places of business were ransacked. They were forced to pay Judenvermögensabgabe, a collective fine or "atonement contribution" of 1 billion Reichsmarks (€4.5 billion or US$5.3 billion in 2021) for the murder of Ernst vom Rath, which was levied by the compulsory acquisition of 20% of all Jewish property by the state. Insurance payments worth 6 million Reichsmarks (€27 million or US$32 million in 2021) for property damage due to the Jewish community were instead paid to the Reich government as "damages to the German Nation". Jews were required to pay for the cost of all damages caused by the pogrom to their residences and businesses.

The number of emigrating Jews surged, as those who were able to leave abandoned the country. In the ten months following Kristallnacht, more than 115,000 Jews emigrated from the Reich. The majority went to other European countries, the United States or Mandatory Palestine, though at least 14,000 made it to Shanghai, China.

As part of government policy, the Nazis seized houses, shops, and other property the émigrés left behind. Many of the destroyed remains of Jewish property plundered during Kristallnacht were dumped near Brandenburg. In October 2008, this dumpsite was discovered by Yaron Svoray, an investigative journalist. The site, the size of four football fields, contained an extensive array of personal and ceremonial items looted during the riots against Jewish property and places of worship on the night of 9 November 1938. It is believed the goods were brought by rail to the outskirts of the village and dumped on designated land. Among the items found were glass bottles engraved with the Star of David, mezuzot, painted window sills, and the armrests of chairs found in synagogues, in addition to an ornamental swastika.

== Responses to Kristallnacht ==
=== In Germany ===
The reaction of non-Jewish Germans to Kristallnacht was varied. Many spectators gathered on the scenes, most of them in silence. The local fire departments confined themselves to preventing the flames from spreading to neighboring buildings. In Berlin, police Lieutenant Otto Bellgardt prevented SA troopers from setting the New Synagogue on fire, earning his superior officer a verbal reprimand from the commissioner.

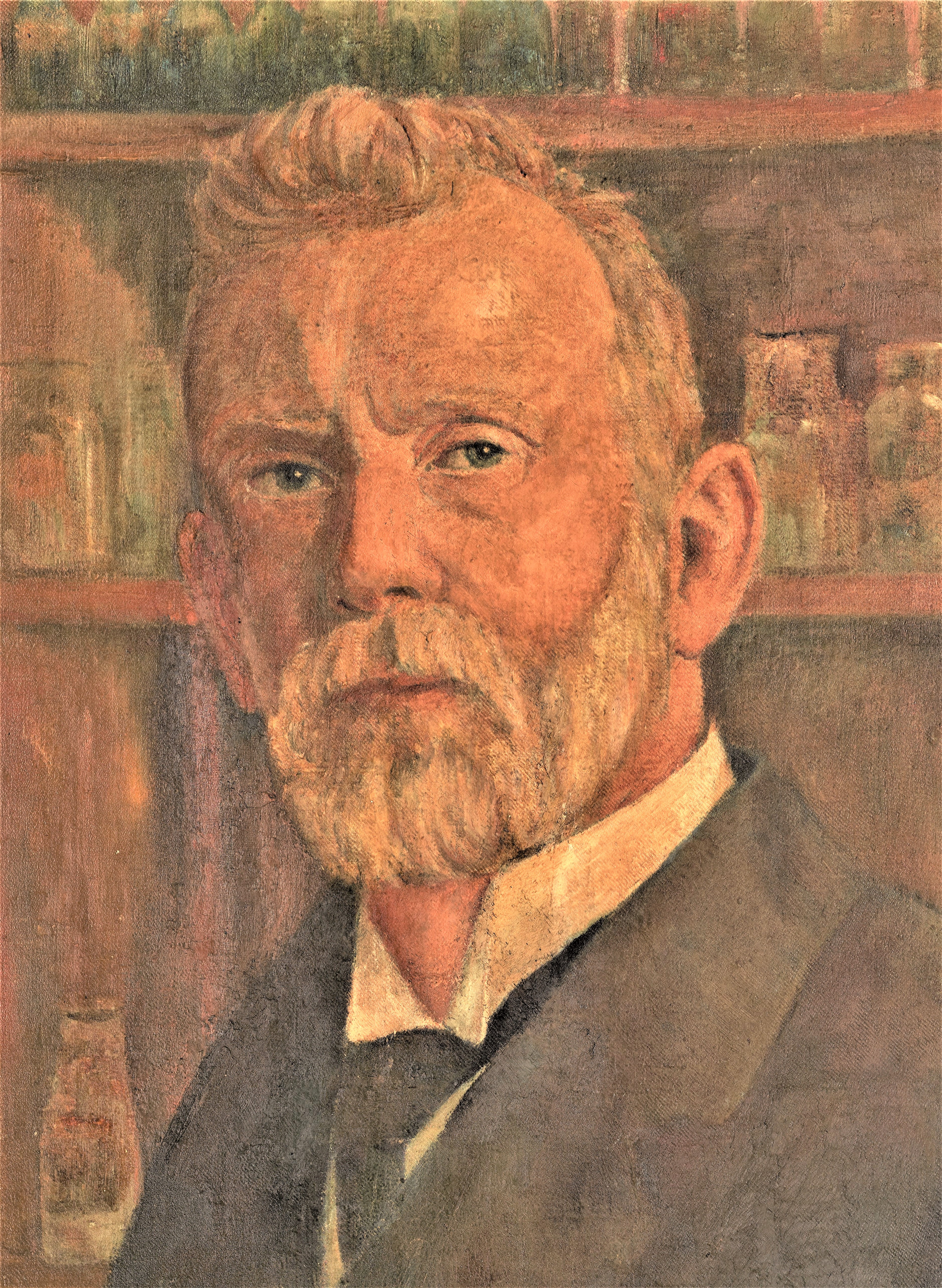
Portrait of Paul Ehrlich, damaged on Kristallnacht, then restored by a German neighbor

The British historian Martin Gilbert believes that "many non-Jews resented the round-up", his opinion being supported by German witness Dr. Arthur Flehinger who recalls seeing "people crying while watching from behind their curtains". Rolf Dessauer recalls how a neighbor came forward and restored a portrait of Paul Ehrlich that had been "slashed to ribbons" by the Sturmabteilung. "He wanted it to be known that not all Germans supported Kristallnacht."

The extent of the damage done on Kristallnacht was so great that many Germans are said to have expressed their disapproval of it, and described it as senseless. There was, however, no personal comment or even acknowledgment from the German leader Adolf Hitler himself about Kristallnacht.

In an article released for publication on the evening of 11 November, Goebbels ascribed the events of Kristallnacht to the "healthy instincts" of the German people. He went on to explain: "The German people are anti-Semitic. It has no desire to have its rights restricted or to be provoked in the future by parasites of the Jewish race." Less than 24 hours after Kristallnacht, Adolf Hitler made a one-hour-long speech in front of a group of journalists where he completely ignored the prior evening's events. According to Eugene Davidson, the reason for this was that Hitler wished to avoid being directly connected to an event that he knew many of those present condemned, regardless of Goebbels's unconvincing explanation that Kristallnacht was caused by popular wrath. Goebbels met the foreign press in the afternoon of 11 November and said that the burning of synagogues and damage to Jewish owned property had been "spontaneous manifestations of indignation against the murder of Herr Vom Rath by the young Jew Grynsban [sic]".

In 1938, just after Kristallnacht, the psychologist Michael Müller-Claudius interviewed 41 randomly selected Nazi Party members on their attitudes toward racial persecution. Of the interviewed party members, 63% expressed extreme indignation against it, 5% expressed approval, and the remaining 32% were noncommittal. A study conducted in 1933 had then shown that 33% of Nazi Party members held no racial prejudice, while 13% supported persecution. Sarah Ann Gordon sees two possible reasons for this difference. First, by 1938, large numbers of Germans had joined the Nazi Party for pragmatic reasons, rather than ideology, thus diluting the percentage of rabid antisemites; second, the Kristallnacht could have caused party members to reject antisemitism that had been acceptable to them in abstract terms, but which they could not support when they saw it concretely enacted. During the events of Kristallnacht, several Gauleiter and deputy Gauleiters had refused orders to enact the Kristallnacht, and many leaders of the SA and Hitler Youth also openly refused party orders, while expressing disgust. Some Nazis helped Jews during the Kristallnacht.

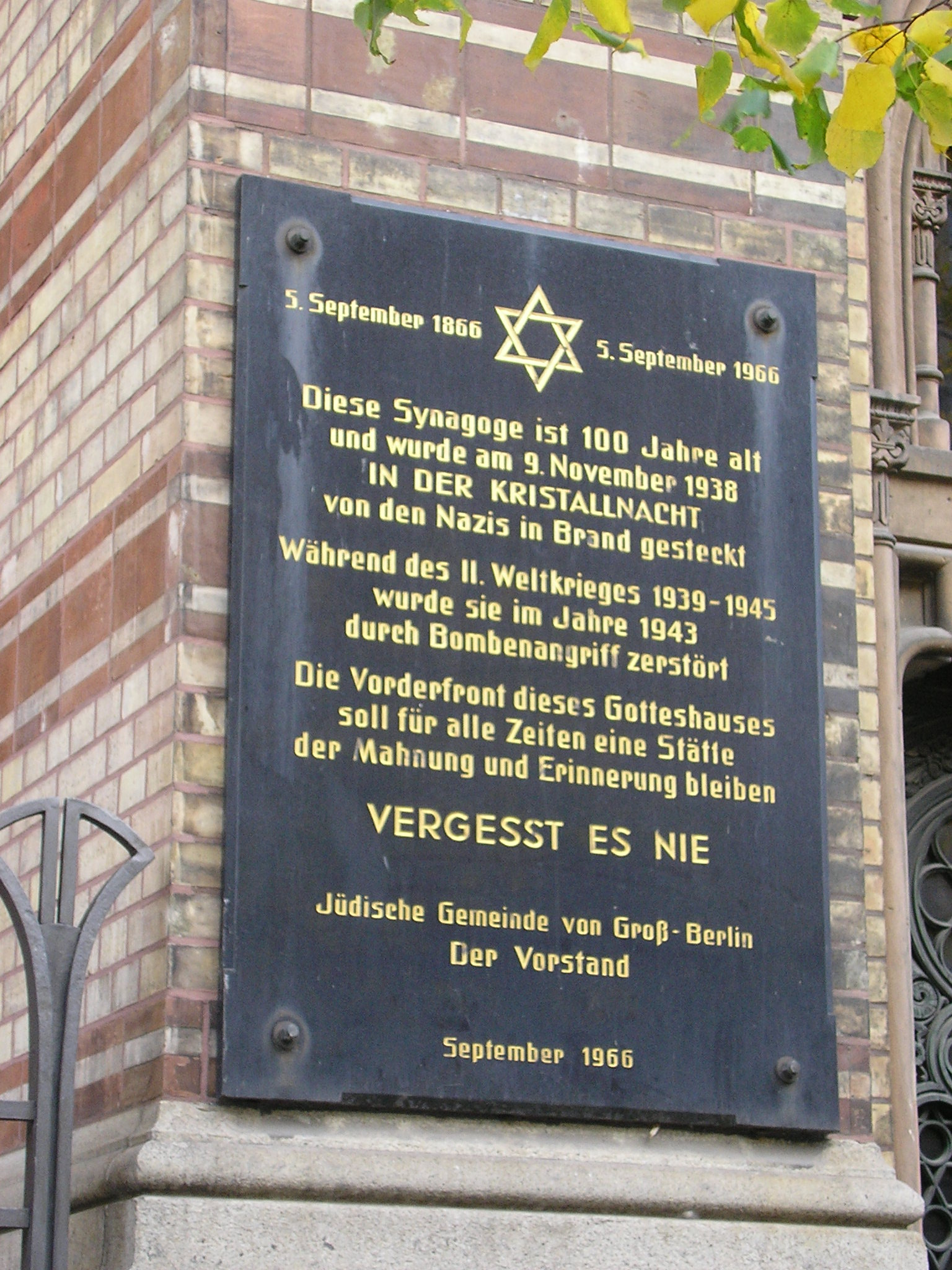
After 1945 some synagogues were restored. This one in Berlin features a plaque, reading "Never forget", a common expression around Berlin.

As it was aware that the German public did not support the Kristallnacht, the propaganda ministry directed the German press to portray opponents of racial persecution as disloyal. The press was also under orders to downplay the Kristallnacht, describing general events at the local level only, with prohibition against depictions of individual events. In 1939 this was extended to a prohibition on reporting any anti-Jewish measures.

The U.S. ambassador to Germany reported:

In view of this being a totalitarian state a surprising characteristic of the situation here is the intensity and scope among German citizens of condemnation of the recent happenings against Jews.

To the consternation of the Nazis, the Kristallnacht affected public opinion counter to their desires, spurring the peak of opposition to Nazi racial policies; according to almost all accounts, the vast majority of Germans rejected the violence perpetrated against the Jews. Verbal complaints grew rapidly, with the Düsseldorf branch of the Gestapo reporting a sharp decline in anti-Semitic attitudes among the population.

There are many indications of Protestant and Catholic disapproval of racial persecution; for example, anti-Nazi Protestants adopted the Barmen Declaration in 1934, the Catholic church had already distributed pastoral letters critical of Nazi racial ideology, and the Nazi regime expected to encounter organised resistance from these parties following Kristallnacht. The Catholic leadership, however, just as the various Protestant churches, refrained from responding with organised action.

Martin Sasse, Nazi Party member and bishop of the Evangelical Lutheran Church in Thuringia, leading member of the Nazi German Christians—one of the schismatic factions of German Protestantism—published a compendium of Martin Luther's writings shortly after the Kristallnacht. He "applauded the burning of the synagogues" and the coincidence of the day, writing in the introduction, "On 10 November 1938, on Luther's birthday, the synagogues are burning in Germany." The German people, he urged, ought to heed these words "of the greatest anti-Semite of his time, the warner of his people against the Jews." British theologian Diarmaid MacCulloch wrote in 2004 that Luther's 1543 pamphlet, "On the Jews and Their Lies" was a "blueprint" for the Kristallnacht.

=== Internationally ===
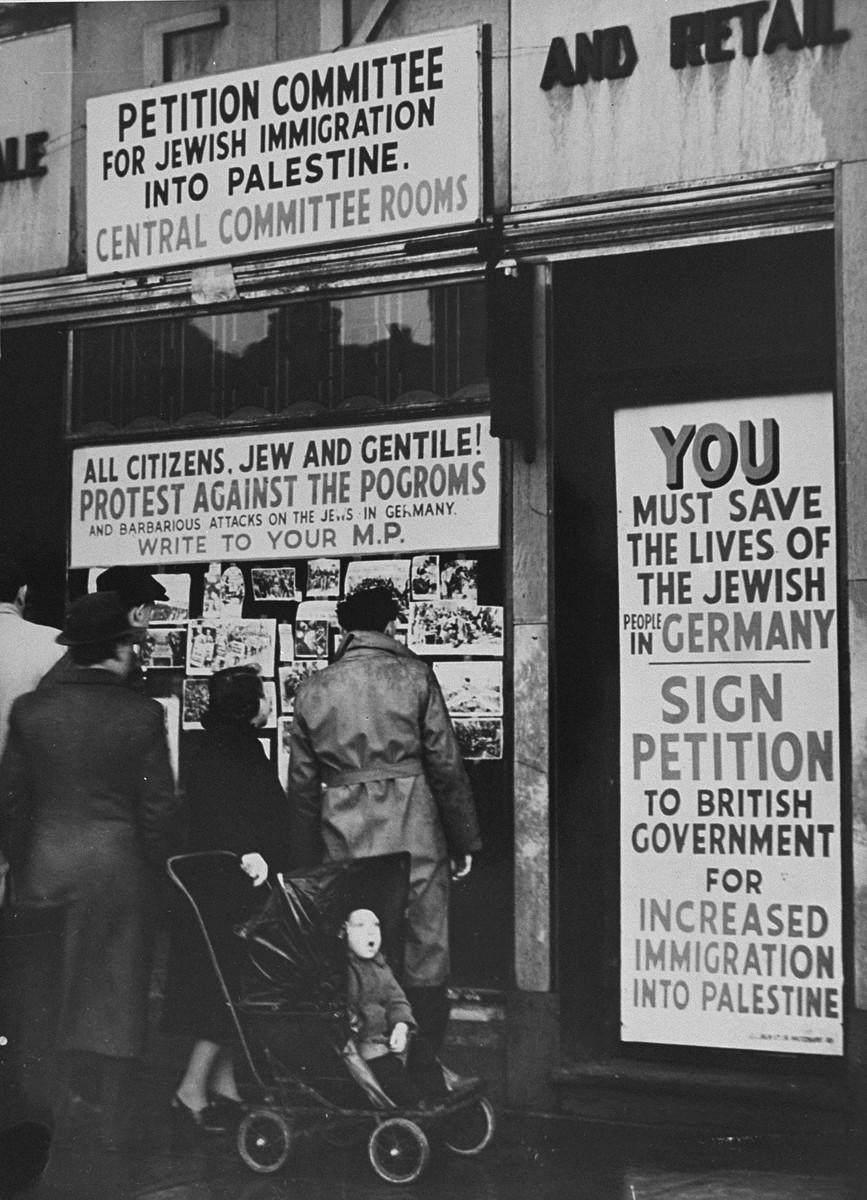
British Jews protest against immigration restrictions to Palestine after Kristallnacht, November 1938.

Kristallnacht sparked international outrage. According to Volker Ullrich, "a line had been crossed: Germany had left the community of civilised nations." It discredited pro-Nazi movements in Europe and North America, leading to a sharp decline in their support. Many newspapers condemned Kristallnacht, with some of them comparing it to the murderous pogroms incited by Imperial Russia. The United States recalled its ambassador Hugh Wilson, but it did not break off diplomatic relations, while other governments severed diplomatic relations with Germany in protest. The British government approved the Kindertransport program for refugee children.

The pogrom marked a turning point in relations between Nazi Germany and the rest of the world. The brutality of Kristallnacht, and the Nazi government's deliberate policy of encouraging the violence once it had begun, laid bare the repressive nature and widespread anti-Semitism entrenched in Germany. World opinion thus turned sharply against the Nazi regime, with some politicians calling for war. On 6 December 1938, William Cooper, an Aboriginal Australian, led a delegation of the Australian Aboriginal League on a march through Melbourne to the German Consulate to deliver a petition which condemned the "cruel persecution of the Jewish people by the Nazi government of Germany". German officials refused to accept the tendered document.

In Spain, as the civil war was raging on, reactions were mixed on both sides. The Nationalist-controlled press celebrated Kristallnacht, repeating the Nazi version of the events and justifying the events from an antisemitic, Catholic perspective. Meanwhile, the Republican-controlled ones condemned it, while the Republican government offered refugee status to people suffering persecution from the Nazi regime.

After Kristallnacht, Salvador Allende, Gabriel González Videla, Marmaduke Grove, Florencio Durán and other members of the Congress of Chile sent a telegram to Adolf Hitler denouncing the persecution of Jews. A more personal response, in 1939, was the oratorio A Child of Our Time by the English composer Michael Tippett. Once the government of Sweden was informed of Kristallnacht, it successfully demanded the Nazi authorities stamp the letter J in red ink on passports of German Jews to make it easier for Swedish border officials to turn them away.

=== Post-war trials ===
After the end of World War II, there were hundreds of trials over Kristallnacht. The trials were conducted exclusively by German and Austrian courts; the Allied occupation authorities did not have jurisdiction since none of the victims were Allied nationals.

== Kristallnacht as a turning point ==
Kristallnacht changed the nature of Nazi Germany's persecution of the Jews from economic, political, and social exclusion to physical violence, including beatings, incarceration, and murder; the event is often referred to as the beginning of the Holocaust. In this view, it is not only described as a pogrom, it is also described as a critical stage within a process in which each step becomes the seed of the next step. An account cited that Hitler's green light for Kristallnacht was made with the belief that it would help him realize his ambition of getting rid of the Jews in Germany. Prior to this large-scale and organized violence against the Jews, the Nazis' primary objective was to eject them from Germany, leaving their wealth behind. In the words of historian Max Rein in 1988, "Kristallnacht came ... and everything was changed."

While November 1938 predated the overt articulation of "the Final Solution", it foreshadowed the genocide to come. Around the time of Kristallnacht, the SS newspaper Das Schwarze Korps called for a "destruction by swords and flames." At a conference on the day after the pogrom, Hermann Göring said: "The Jewish problem will reach its solution if, in anytime soon, we will be drawn into war beyond our border—then it is obvious that we will have to manage a final account with the Jews."

Kristallnacht was also instrumental in changing global public opinion. In the United States, for instance, it was this specific incident that came to symbolize Nazism, forging the association between National Socialism and evil.

== Modern references ==
Five decades later, 9 November's association with the anniversary of Kristallnacht, as well as the earlier Beer Hall Putsch, was cited as the main reason as to why Schicksalstag, the day the Berlin Wall came down in 1989, was not turned into a new German national holiday; a different day was chosen (3 October 1990, German reunification).

The avant-garde guitarist Gary Lucas's 1988 composition "Verklärte Kristallnacht", which juxtaposes what would become the Israeli national anthem ten years after Kristallnacht, "Hatikvah", with phrases from the German national anthem "Deutschland Über Alles" amid wild electronic shrieks and noise, is intended to be a sonic representation of the horrors of Kristallnacht. It was premiered at the 1988 Berlin Jazz Festival and received rave reviews. (The title is a reference to Arnold Schoenberg's 1899 work Verklärte Nacht that presaged his pioneering work on atonal music; Schoenberg was an Austrian Jew who would move to the United States to escape the Nazis).

In 1989, Al Gore, then a senator from Tennessee and later Vice President of the United States, wrote of an "ecological Kristallnacht" in The New York Times. He opined that events which were then taking place, such as deforestation and ozone depletion, prefigured a greater environmental catastrophe in the same way that Kristallnacht prefigured the Holocaust.

Kristallnacht was the inspiration for the 1993 album Kristallnacht by the composer John Zorn. The German power metal band Masterplan's debut album, Masterplan (2003), features an anti-Nazi song entitled "Crystal Night" as the fourth track. The German band BAP published a song titled "Kristallnaach" in their Cologne dialect, dealing with the emotions engendered by the Kristallnacht.

Kristallnacht was the inspiration for the 1988 composition Mayn Yngele by the composer Frederic Rzewski, of which he says: "I began writing this piece in November 1988, on the 50th anniversary of Kristallnacht .... My piece is a reflection on that vanished part of Jewish tradition which so strongly colors, by its absence, the culture of our time".

In 2014, The Wall Street Journal published a letter from billionaire Thomas Perkins that compared the "progressive war on the American one percent" of wealthiest Americans and the Occupy movement's "demonization of the rich" to Kristallnacht and antisemitism in Nazi Germany. The letter was widely criticized and condemned in The Atlantic, The Independent, among bloggers, Twitter users, and "his own colleagues in Silicon Valley". Perkins subsequently apologized for making the comparisons with Nazi Germany, but otherwise stood by his letter, saying, "In the Nazi era it was racial demonization, now it's class demonization."

Kristallnacht has been referenced both explicitly and implicitly in countless cases of vandalism of Jewish property including the toppling of gravestones in a Jewish cemetery in suburban St. Louis, Missouri, and the two 2017 vandalisms of the New England Holocaust Memorial, as the memorial's founder Steve Ross discusses in his book, From Broken Glass: My Story of Finding Hope in Hitler's Death Camps to Inspire a New Generation. The Sri Lankan Finance Minister Mangala Samaraweera also used the term to describe the violence in 2019 against Muslims by Sinhalese nationalists.

On 10 January 2021, former Governor of California Arnold Schwarzenegger gave a speech claiming that President Donald Trump had incited the attack on the U.S. Capitol on 6 January, comparing the event to Kristallnacht.

On 9 November 2022, KFC app users in Germany were sent a message reading "It's memorial day for Kristallnacht! Treat yourself with more tender cheese on your crispy chicken." KFC issued an apology approximately an hour later, blaming the original message on an "error in our system".

The Fortnite Holocaust Museum, a virtual museum based inside the videogame Fortnite, is set to feature a display featuring the Kristallnacht.

On 9 November 2024, the Kristallnacht anniversary, the only glatt kosher restaurant in Washington, D.C. had its windows smashed.

The November 2024 Amsterdam riots in the Netherlands have been compared by Israeli and pro-Israeli organizations to Kristallnacht. On 7 November 2024, Jewish and Israeli supporters of the Maccabi Tel Aviv football team were attacked by pro-Palestinian groups and local football attendees following that day's UEFA Europa League match. The Amsterdam attacks were internationally condemned. Jewish advocacy groups Combat Antisemitism Movement, the Orthodox Union, and the Jewish Federation, called the November 2024 Amsterdam attacks a "modern-day Kristallnacht". Israeli Prime Minister Benjamin Netanyahu condemned the attacks, stating that it took place just before the 86th anniversary of Kristallnacht and bore many similarities. The German Foreign Minister, Annalena Baerbock wrote on X: "The images out of Amsterdam are awful and deeply shameful. The outbreak of such violence against Jews breaks all boundaries. There is no justification for this". Other organizations described this characterization as one-sided, accusing Maccabi fans of pulling down Palestinian flags from houses, making racist anti-Arab chants such as "death to Arabs", assaulting people, and vandalizing local property.

In 2025 a feature film titled Kristallnacht directed by Stefan Ruzowitzky about the historical events was in production in Austria on the 80th anniversary of the Nuremberg Trials. Kristallnacht was also mentioned in the 2025 Sky Original Film Nuremberg, starring Rami Malek, Russell Crowe and Michael Shannon as Robert H. Jackson.

== Names for Kristallnacht ==
The events of November 1938 have been given disparate names by the perpetrators, bystanders, victims, and historians. In the post-war years, the terms Kristallnacht and Reichskristallnacht became established in West Germany and abroad. Despite speculation that the term was coined by the Nazis, there is no documented written use of the term before the end of World War II. Despite this, many people later recalled the term being used at the time, leading historians to conclude the term originated from the general public. In East Germany, the state typically referred to the events as "fascist pogrom night" (German: "faschistische Pogromnacht"). At least one source active at the time used the term November Tenth in a 1939 article to describe the November 10, 1938 violence.

Beginning in the late 1970s, alternative names for Kristallnacht were introduced in the German-speaking world as the "postwar generations began challenging their parents' sanitized version of history". By the 1980s, the "harmless-sounding" term "Kristallnacht" began to be supplanted by several alternatives, such as Reichspogromnacht, Novemberpogrome, and Novemberterror.

Linguistically and historically, the word Kristallnacht is felt to be problematic, as it is seen by many as a euphemistic term that trivializes anti-Jewish violence, which avoids mentioning either the perpetrators or the fact that the murders, looting, and arson were officially encouraged by the state. Focusing on "broken glass" places vandalism in the foreground and ignores the murders that were committed. Heinz Galinski, the former president of the Central Council of Jews in Germany, criticized the term in 1978, stating "more than just glass was broken. People were killed." The use of the word "night" belies the fact that much of the violence was committed in broad daylight, and the violence was not confined to a single night. Many of the 30,000 Jews arrested following Kristallnacht were still imprisoned in concentration camps months later. The term's unclear origins also suggest it originated from the German public and not the event's victims. Although no evidence has been found to confirm this, "Kristallnacht" is still perceived by many as a Nazi coinage.

Although Novemberpogrome is today the dominant term in Germany, some historians and authors have also criticized the use of the term "pogrom", as it incorporates associations that can be interpreted as trivializing the events. The scale of Kristallnacht far outstripped any pogroms in the Russian Empire, which were local or regional events of spontaneous, lawless mass-violence against Jews and their property. Those massacres were initiated by a local population with at most the tacit approval of the local authorities and police. In contrast, the events of Kristallnacht were centrally organized by the national government and systematically carried out across the country, a connotation which is missing from the word "pogrom". The word "pogrom" also places the events in a context that suggests that the Holocaust was not unique. Furthermore, the word "Kristallnacht" is already established in other languages, so divergent vocabulary can add confusion and difficulty when communicating with researchers and people abroad.

On the 80th anniversary, the president of the German Historical Museum stated that there "will never be" an adequate name for the events of Kristallnacht.

== See also ==
- Aktionsjuden
- Nathan Israel Department Store
- November 9 in German history
- Spandau Synagogue
- A Child of Our Time

== Sources ==
- Gilbert, Martin (2006). Kristallnacht: prelude to destruction. Making history series. London: Harper Press. ISBN 978-0-00-719240-3.
- Gordon, Sarah Ann (1984). Hitler, Germans and the "Jewish question". Princeton, N.J.: Princeton University Press. ISBN 978-0-691-10162-0.
- Ullrich, Volker (2016). Hitler: Ascent 1889-1939. Translated by Chase, Jefferson. New York: Vintage Books. ISBN 978-1-101-87205-5.

=== Further reading ===
- Friedländer, Saul (1998). Nazi Germany and the Jews. New York (N.Y.): Harper Perennial. pp. 269–293. ISBN 978-0-06-092878-0.
- Deem, James M. (2012). Kristallnacht: the Nazi terror that began the Holocaust. Berkeley Heights, NJ: Enslow Publishers. ISBN 978-0-7660-3324-5.
- Durance, Jonathan (2013). "Silence and Outrage: Reassessing the Complex Christian Response to Kristallnacht in English-Speaking Canada". History of Intellectual Culture. 10 (1).
- Evans, Richard J. (2006). The Third Reich in power, 1933-1939. London: Penguin Books. pp. 580–610. ISBN 978-0-14-100976-6.
- Ross, Steven J.; et al. (USC Casden Institute) (2019). Ross, Steven Joseph; Gruner, Wolf; Ansell, Lisa (eds.). New Perspectives on Kristallnacht: After 80 Years, the Nazi Pogrom in Global Comparison. The Jewish role in American life: an annual review of the Casden Institute for the Study of the Jewish Role in American Life. West Lafayette, Indiana: Purdue University Press. ISBN 978-1-61249-616-0.; see online excerpt also online review
- Kyle, Jantzen; Durance, Jonathan (2011). "Our Jewish Brethren: Christian Responses to Kristallnacht in Canadian Mass Media" (PDF). Journal of Ecumenical Studies. 46 (4): 537–548.
- McCullough, Colin; Wilson, Nathan Andrew, eds. (2014). Violence, memory, and history: Western perceptions of Kristallnacht. Routledge studies in modern European history. New York: Routledge. ISBN 978-0-415-71632-1.
- Mazzenga, Maria, ed. (2009). American religious responses to Kristallnacht. New York, NY: Palgrave Macmillan. ISBN 978-0-230-61806-0.
- Mayer, Kurt (2009). My Personal Brush with History (PDF). Tacoma: Confluence Books. ISBN 978-0-578-03911-4. LCCN 2009938658.
- Mara, Wil (2009). Kristallnacht: Nazi persecution of the Jews in Europe. Perspectives on. New York: Marshall Cavendish Benchmark. ISBN 978-0-7614-4026-0.
- Steinweis, Alan E. (2009). Kristallnacht 1938. Cambridge, Mass: Belknap Press of Harvard University Press. ISBN 978-0-674-03623-9.
- Welch, Susan (September 2014). "American Opinion Toward Jews During the Nazi Era: Results from Quota Sample Polling During the 1930s and 1940s". Social Science Quarterly. 95 (3): 615–635. doi:10.1111/ssqu.12084. ISSN 0038-4941.

=== Primary sources ===
- Gerhardt, Uta; Karlauf, Thomas; Simmons, Robert; Somers, Nick, eds. (2012). The night of broken glass: eyewitness accounts of Kristallnacht. Cambridge, United Kingdom; Malden, Massachusetts: Polity Press. ISBN 978-0-7456-5084-5. OCLC 747534691.
- Levitt, Ruth, ed. (2015). Pogrom November 1938: testimonies from 'Kristallnacht'. London: Souvenir Press/Wiener Holocaust Library. ISBN 978-0-285-64307-9.

=== In German ===
- Arntz, Hans-Dieter (2008). "Reichskristallnacht": der Novemberpogrom 1938 auf dem Lande; Gerichtsakten und Zeugenaussagen am Beispiel der Eifel und Voreifel (in German). Aachen: Helios Verlag. ISBN 978-3-938208-69-4.
- Döscher, Hans-Jürgen (1988). Reichskristallnacht: die Novemberpogrome 1938 (in German). Frankfurt: Ullstein Verlag. ISBN 978-3-550-07495-0.
- Faludi, Christian, ed. (2013). Die "Juni-Aktion" 1938: eine Dokumentation zur Radikalisierung der Judenverfolgung (in German). Frankfurt: Campus Verlag. ISBN 978-3-593-39823-5.
- Korb, Alexander (2007). Reaktionen der deutschen Bevölkerung auf die Novemberpogrome: im Spiegel amtlicher Berichte (in German). Saarbrücken: VDM Verlag Dr. Müller. ISBN 978-3-8364-4823-9.
- Lauber, Heinz (1981). Juden-Pogrom: "Reichskristallnacht" November 1938 in Großdeutschland; Daten, Fakten, Dokumente-Quellentexte, Thesen und Bewertungen. Aktuelles Taschenbuch (in German). Gerlingen: Bleicher. ISBN 978-3-88350-005-8.
- Pätzold, Kurt; Runge, Irene (1988). Kristallnacht: zum Pogrom 1938. Kleine Bibliothek; Geschichte (in German). Köln: Pahl-Rugenstein. ISBN 978-3-7609-1233-2.
- Adam, Uwe Dietrich; Pehle, Walter H., eds. (1988). Der Judenpogrom 1938: von der "Reichskristallnacht" zum Völkermord (in German) (Originalausg ed.). Frankfurt am Main: Fischer Taschenbuch Verlag. ISBN 978-3-596-24386-0.
- Schultheis, Herbert (1985). Die Reichskristallnacht in Deutschland nach Augenzeugenberichten. Bad Neustädter Beiträge zur Geschichte und Heimatkunde Frankens (in German). Bad Neustadt a.d. Saale: Rötter Druck und Verlag. ISBN 978-3-9800482-3-1.
