= Georg Friedrich Alexan =

German journalist (1901–1994)

- Born: Georg Kupfermann; 12 July 1901; Mannheim, Germany
- Died: 11 January 1994 (aged 92); Dornum, Germany
- Occupation: Journalist
- Known for: Editor-in-chief of USA in Wort und Bild

Georg Friedrich Alexan (born Georg Kupfermann on 12 July 1901 in Mannheim; died on 11 January 1994 in Dornum) was a Jewish German journalist, best remembered as the editor-in-chief of the East German newspaper USA in Wort und Bild.
